= Regina's historic buildings and precincts =

Historic architecture of Regina, Saskatchewan

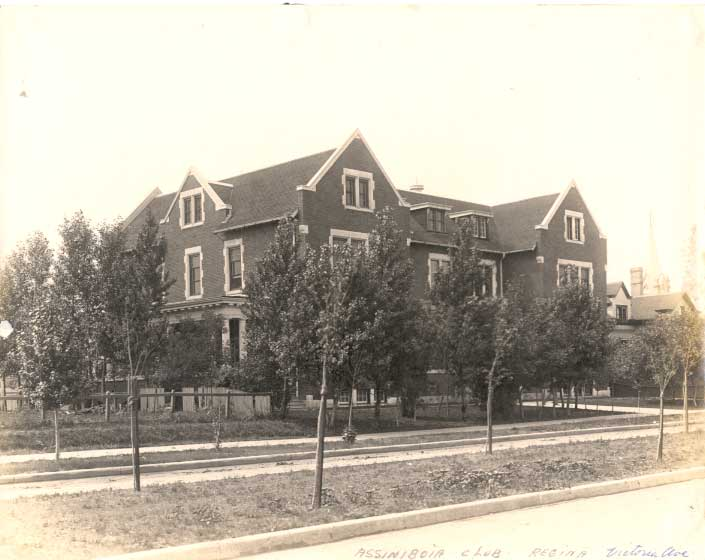
Assiniboia Club, 1925 Victoria Avenue, 1911. Founded in 1882, all North-West Territories leaders while Regina was the capital, Saskatchewan premiers and lieutenant governors and mayors of Regina were members from then until the Club closed in 1994.

Many historically significant buildings in Regina, Saskatchewan were lost during the period 1945 through approximately 1970 when the urge to "modernize" overtook developers' and city planners' sense of history and heritage. The old warehouse district to the north of the old CPR tracks was Regina's original commercial raison d'être once Lieutenant-Governor Edgar Dewdney had established the site of his considerable landholdings as the Territorial Capital. 1899 to 1919 Washington Park and 3431 Dewdney Ave building as CPR commercial logistics building, expanded connected with significant conversion of shipping of commercial goods from train to truck and cancellation of passenger service on the railway, the Warehouse District immediately adjacent to the train line has ceased to be exclusively industrial in character. Some areas of the Warehouse District have been transformed into a shopping, entertainment and residential precinct.

The Assiniboia Club on Victoria Avenue—in the early days before the division of Saskatchewan and Alberta off from the North-West Territories in 1905 the names Assiniboia and Qu'Appelle were considered for what became the Province of Saskatchewan, and indeed the Anglican diocese was named and remains Qu'Appelle—has long since ceased to be an élite men's club and continues in use as a restaurant; the former Anglican Diocesan property is now being commercially developed with designated historic buildings protected against outright demolition. Significant historic buildings and precincts include the following.

== Government ==
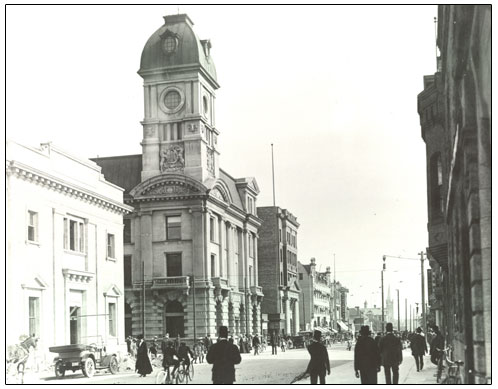
Old Post Office ("Prince Edward Building") viewed from intersection of 11th Avenue and Scarth Street looking west, pre-First World War

=== Federal ===
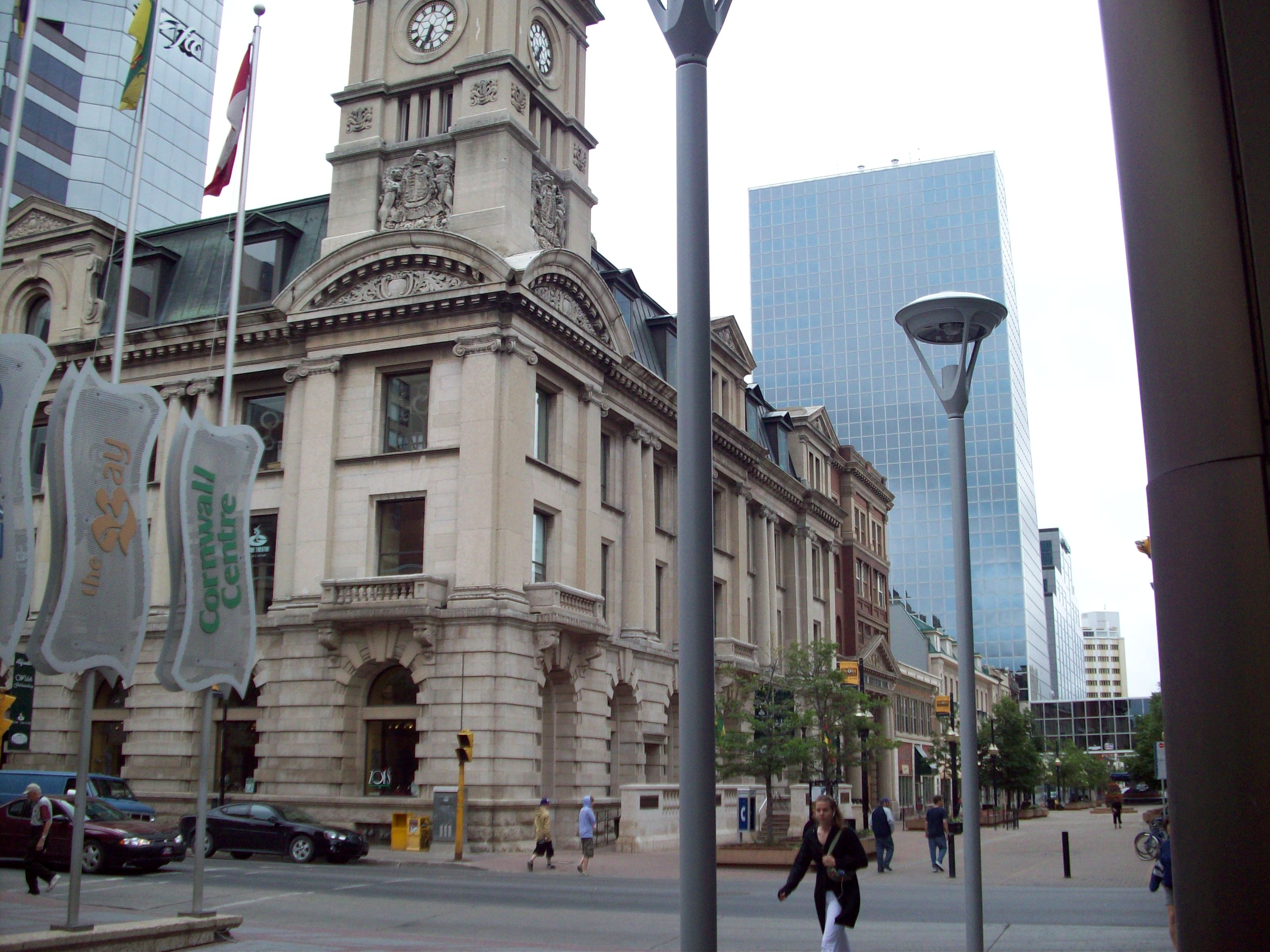
Old Post Office and Scarth Street Mall. Note McCallum & Hill Tower 2 in background at 12th Avenue and Scarth Street

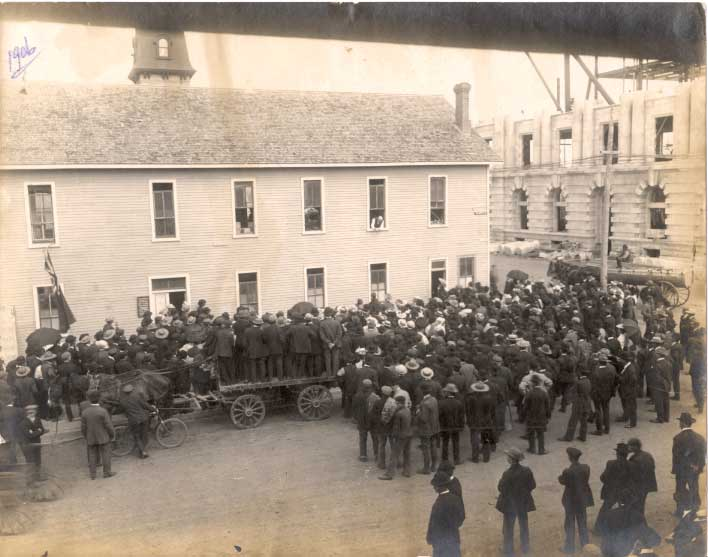
Post Office under construction in 1906 next to the old city hall with an auction occurring there

The old Post Office (officially renamed the Prince Edward Building in 2003) has now been converted to commercial and cultural use in connection with the ongoing attempt now dating back three decades to revitalize downtown Scarth Street as a pedestrian mall. It houses the Globe Theatre. It was completed in 1907; its 1912 clock tower was for many years locally regarded as Regina’s Big Ben. The building was replaced as a post office in 1956 by the current post office on Saskatchewan Drive (formerly South Railway Street).

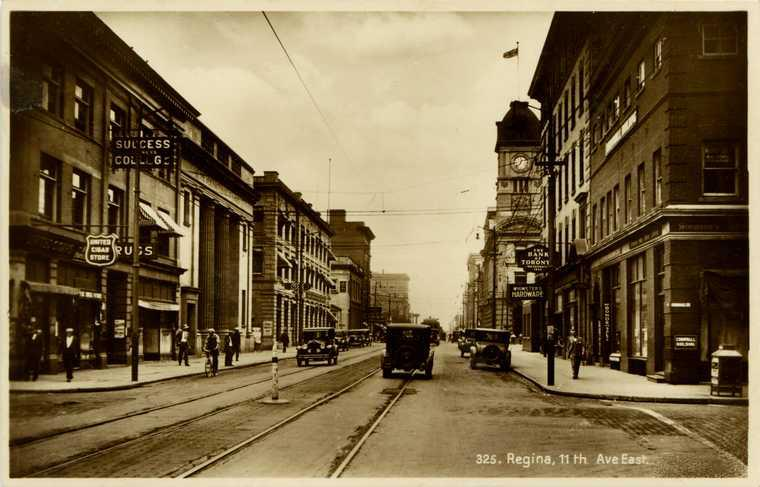
Eleventh Avenue facing east past the Post Office circa 1925

Regina's second multi-story office block after the venerable and now-demolished McCallum & Hill Building was the Motherwell Building at the corner of Victoria Avenue and Rose Street. It was constructed in 1954–56 to a design by local Regina architects in the typical "international style," with its outer service being Tyndall stone. Its purpose was to house, inter alia, Prairie Farm Rehabilitation Administration (PFRA) and Western Canadian Engineering Projects. It has official heritage status in recognition of its architectural significance and has now been converted to condominium title and residential use.

For many years it, together with the immediately adjacent Hotel Saskatchewan and the 1963 Saskatchewan Power Building, also on Victoria Avenue, were, with the Provincial Legislative Building and the spires of Holy Rosary Roman Catholic Cathedral, the only high-rise structures in the city. They were visible from many miles' distance as one approached Regina by road from any direction, though multiple multi-story buildings now obscure the older ones. (The open top floor of the Saskatchewan Power Building was long open for the public to have a high-rise open air view, which of course is extremely long distance on the absolutely featureless plain in the Regina area, apart from the modest spring runoff Wascana Creek which begins just a few miles to the southwest; it is now long-since closed as a precaution against anyone using the site for jumping as suicide.)

=== Territorial ===
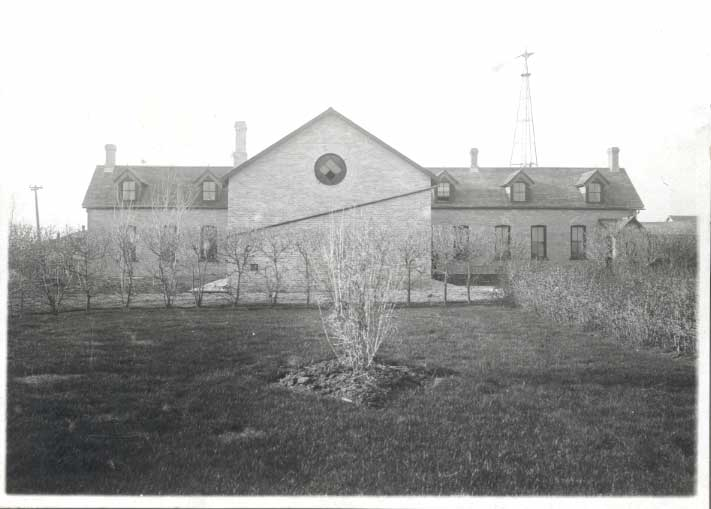
Territorial Administration Building, Dewdney Avenue, circa 1915; legislative chamber in foreground

The Territorial Government buildings on Dewdney Avenue, dating from 1883, consisted of the Legislative Building, the Administration Building and the Indian Office and were designed by the Dominion architect, Thomas Fuller. The mansard roofed Administration Building, a Provincial Heritage Property, remains standing; it was restored in 1979 and currently sits vacant.

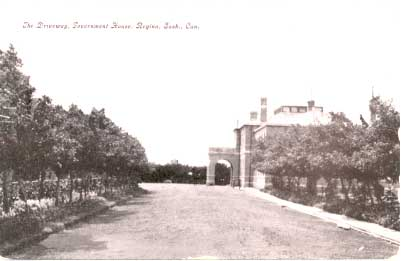
Government House, c.1915, from Dewdney Avenue entrance, Regina

Government House on Dewdney Avenue was completed in 1891 as the vice-regal residence for the Lieutenant-Governor of the North-West Territories. It replaced the first Government House on the present site of Luther College farther west on Dewdney Avenue. It was the first electrified residence in the Territories and remained the residence of the Lieutenant-Governor of the North-West (later Northwest) Territories and, after the creation of the province of Saskatchewan, of the province until 1944.

The Lieutenant-Governor's office and residence were then moved out of Government House and the office into the Hotel Saskatchewan, then operated by the CPR in downtown Regina. Latterly, with increasing historical sensibility among the general public, it has been restored to its former use as a vice-regal mansion, albeit only for public functions and not as a residence.

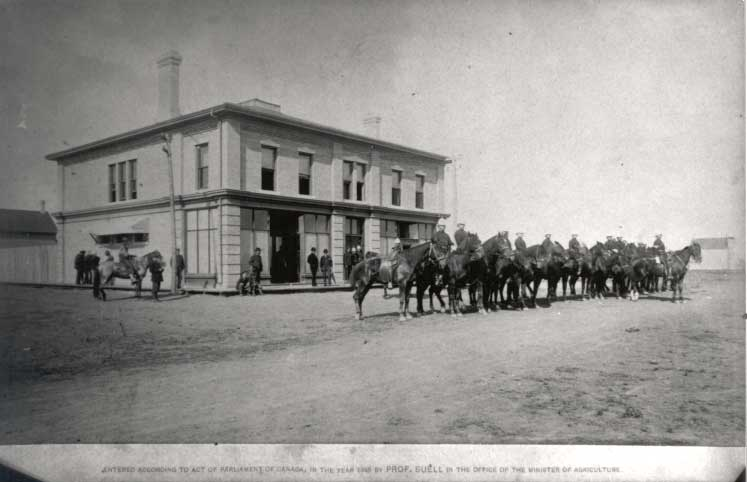
Front side view of the first Court House, on northeast corner of Scarth Street and Victoria Avenue.

The Regina Court House, built in 1884 on the northeast corner of Scarth Street and Victoria Avenue was where the trial of Louis Riel—before a jury of only six and arguably the most famous or infamous trial in the history of Canada—was held in 1885. It burned down in 1895.

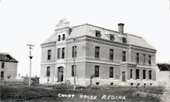
Supreme Court of the North-West Territories Courthouse, 2002 Victoria Avenue, c.1919.

The Supreme Court of the North-West Territories sat in a courthouse built in 1894 on the northwest corner of Hamilton Street and Victoria Avenue. The Supreme Court was established by Parliament in 1886, under its jurisdiction to legislate for the Territories. The Court was the superior trial court in civil and criminal matters, and also the appellate court for the Territories. Individual judges of the court sat as trial judges, while all of the judges sat en banc on appeals. The Supreme Court of the North-West Territories continued to exercise jurisdiction in the Province of Saskatchewan for the first two years of the Province's existence, until it was abolished for Saskatchewan in 1907 and replaced with the Supreme Court of Saskatchewan.

In 1918 The Court of Appeal Act and The King’s Bench Act abolished the Supreme Court, separately constituted the Court of Appeal and established the Court of King's Bench (or Queen's Bench during reigns of female monarchs) as the superior trial court. The 1894 building was replaced in 1965 by the current courthouse on Victoria Avenue between Smith and McIntyre Streets, opposite City Hall. The Avord Tower now stands on the site of the Supreme Court building. As with the 1962 Regina Public Library, the keystone of the original building is on the front lawn of the current courthouse as a decorative feature.

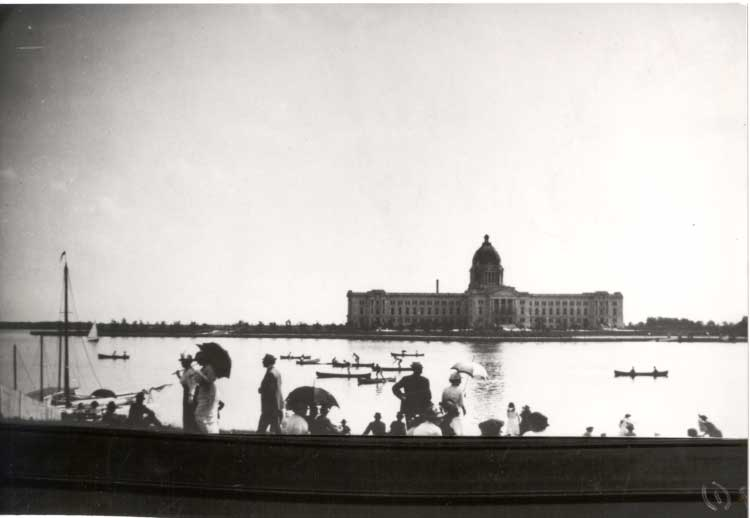
People enjoying a boat race on Wascana Lake north of the Legislative Building circa 1910.

=== Provincial ===
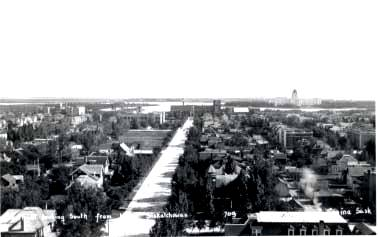
Looking south on Scarth Street as seen from the Hotel Saskatchewan in 1927. Legislative Buildings are visible in background.

The Beaux-Arts Saskatchewan Legislative Building on the south shore of Wascana Lake was constructed 1908–12, replacing the Territorial Administration Building on Dewdney Avenue, east of Government House. Discussion initially contemplated constructing such facilities in city centre on the site which became Victoria Park; the provincial government decided instead to locate them south of the lake, then entirely undeveloped, farmland rather than commercial and residential buildings, which were not built until after the Legislative Building.

Wascana Lake had been created in 1883 by damming Wascana Creek, but between Angus and Rae Streets, 1½ blocks west of the 1908 Albert Street dam and bridge, itself replaced by the present bridge in the same location when Wascana Lake was drained in 1931 for deepening of the bed. The design contemplates expansion of the building by the addition of wings extending south from the east and west ends and coming together to form a courtyard. In the beginning it was anticipated that Regina and the population of the province would soon grow much larger than it has ever become. The plans originally called for the exterior of the building to be red brick but after construction had begun and red bricks were already on the site, Premier Walter Scott insisted on Manitoba tyndall stone being substituted.

It immediately became and remains the dominating architectural presence in Regina. "The streets in Regina’s downtown all provide a clear view of the Legislative Assembly. A bylaw prevents construction of structures that would block this view." Additional provincial government buildings were erected south of the Legislative Building, beginning in the 1950s.

=== Civic, government and business ===
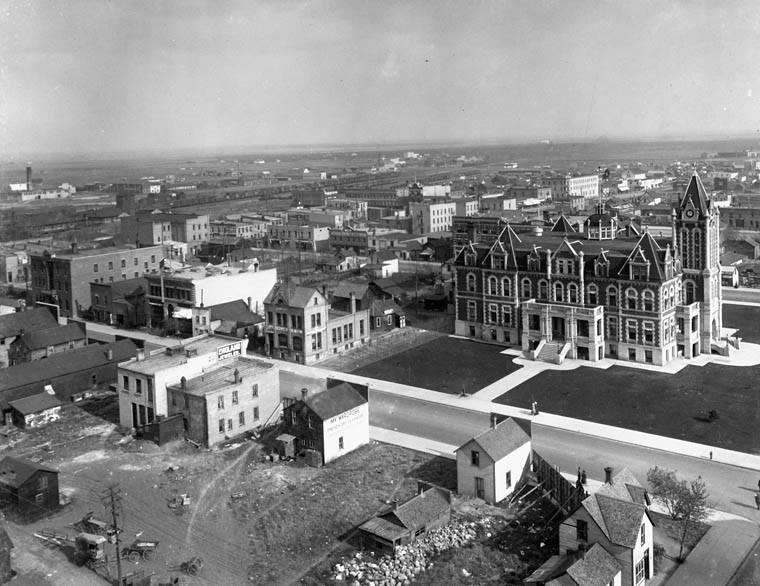
Newly built gingerbread City Hall in 1909 while immediately surrounding business district largely still to come.

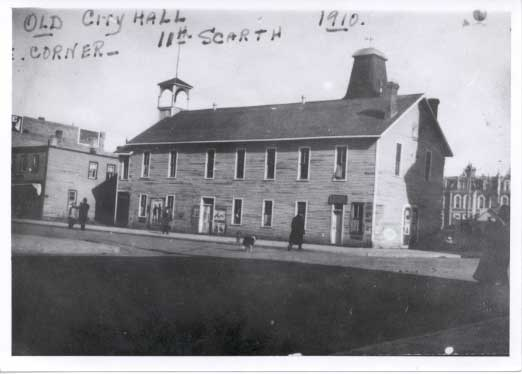
Original city hall on corner of 11th Avenue and Scarth Street before it was demolished. The ‘Gingerbread Hall' that replaced it can be seen in the background, right.

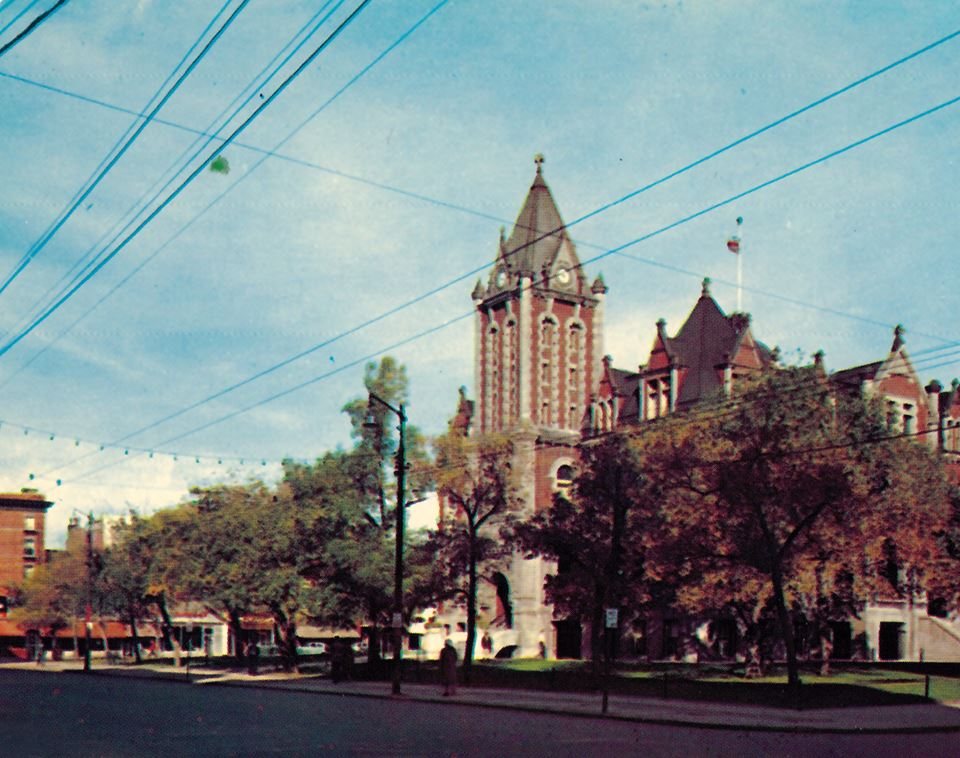
1960, the second of four city halls since Regina was founded in 1882.

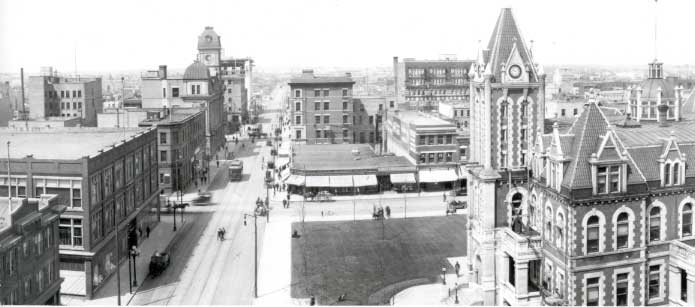
Looking west down 11th Avenue past the old Regina City Hall, 1912.

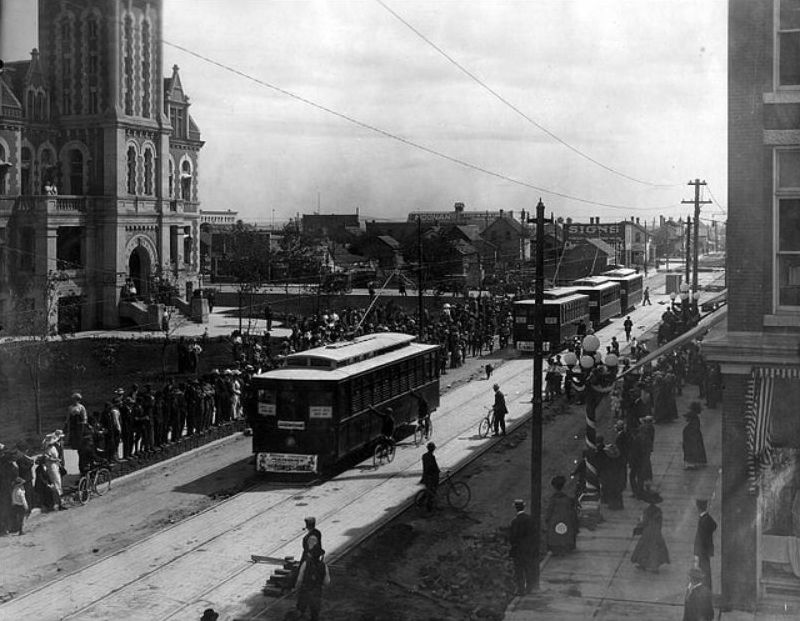
The inauguration of the Regina Municipal Railway in front of the City Hall on 11th Avenue, July 28, 1911.

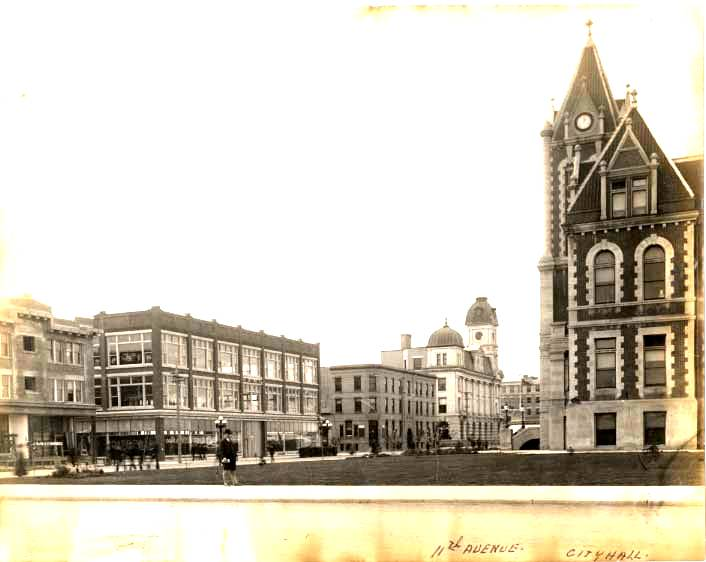
11th Avenue from Rose Street: City Hall on right; G.S. Wood Building on left; R.H. Williams in middle, Leader Building

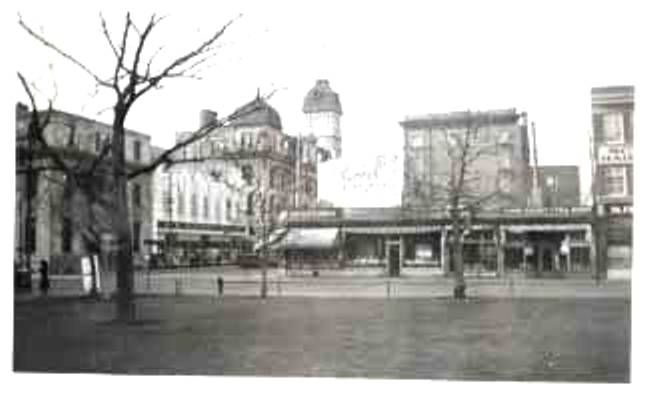
Hamilton Street and 11th Avenue, photographed from the lawn of the old City Hall, 1936.

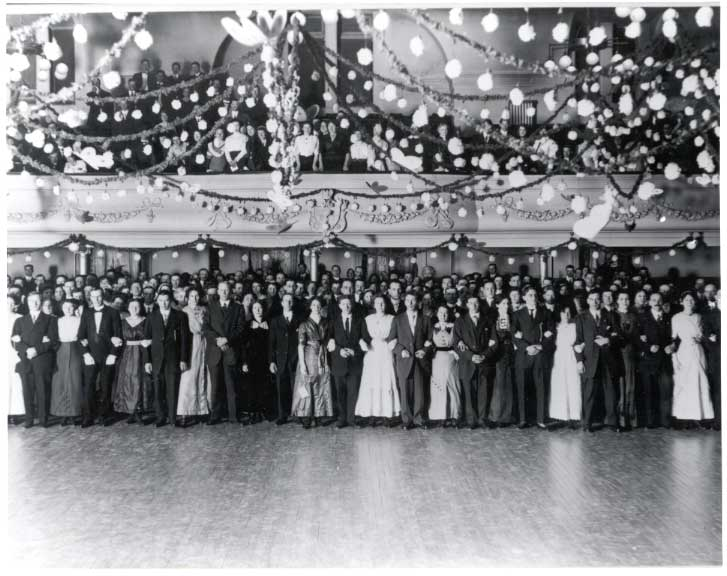
Ball held in gingerbread City Hall 1920 when other ballrooms did not exist and for which current City Hall was not required to have facilities.

The 1908 "gingerbread" Romanesque Revival City Hall on 11th Avenue between Rose and Hamilton Streets provided publicly owned facilities for civic government but also contained a large audience chamber, used for public lectures, balls, theatricals and even boxing matches (see below). In Regina's early days after its 1908 opening—26 years after Regina's founding on the site of Buffalo Bones in 1882—this was an alternative public venue to the Regina Theatre and other privately owned venues. Across 11th Avenue from City Hall at the corner with Hamilton Street was the RH Williams and Sons Department Store.

It was famous for its elaborate window displays. R.H. Williams was also mayor of Regina from 1909 to 1910 ... [and] cast the deciding vote when City Council decided where the tracks should be laid for the street railway that was set to open in the city in 1911 ... [H]is vote ensured that the tracks ran down 11th Avenue, not South Railway Street, so that every streetcar stopped in front of his store."

Second Leader building, corner of 11th Avenue and Hamilton Street, here in 1910.

The Army and Navy discount department store was opened at the corner of 11th Avenue at Broad Street in 1920, only one year after Samuel Joseph Cohen opened the first Army & Navy location in Vancouver in 1919, and it would be across both streets from the Allen (later Metropolitan) and Broadway theatres. The Robert Simpson Company built a mail order house in 1915 at 1050 Broad Street. Considerably north of downtown and next to the original town cemetery, "[d]uring the 1930s the Robert Simpson Company operated a full-service department store on the first four floors of the building[until] 1946, when Simpson's purchased the R.H. Williams and Sons Department Store on Hamilton Street and 11th Avenue and moved the retail end of the operation into that building," when the Broad Street branch changed to wholesale operations; "[t]oday, after many mergers, the company has become Sears Canada, and the Broad Street building is still in use today as a call centre and warehouse." The downtown retail branch closed several years ago as retail trade increasingly moved to shopping malls in the outskirts of the city.

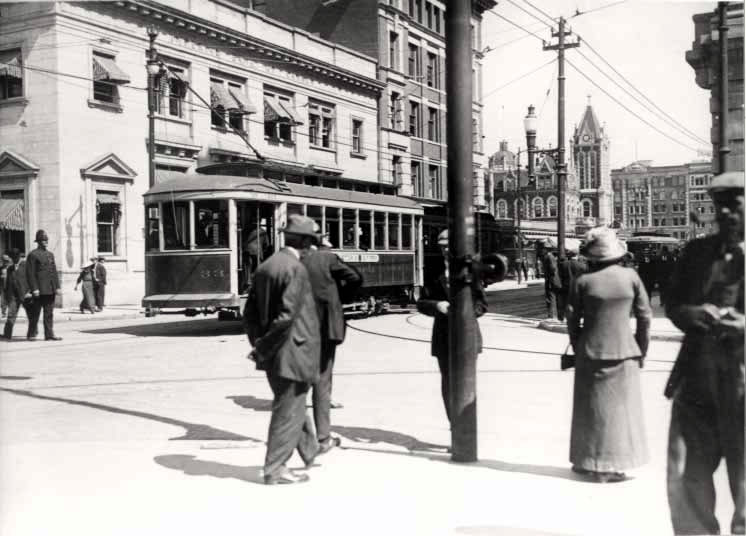
Streetcar and pedestrians, 11th Avenue in the block west of City Hall, 1911.

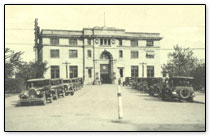
Union Station, built in 1911. From cars in the photo, parked on the access-road through Stanley Park (now a parking lot) from South Railway Street, the photo clearly taken in the mid-1920s

It temporarily relocated for some years to the considerably smaller Beaux-Arts old Post Office building on Scarth and 11th Avenue which had been left standing and essentially without purpose after the construction of the new post office on South Railway Street (now renamed Saskatchewan Drive) after the demolition of the 1908 building, and this saved the old Post Office—now containing the stage of the professional Globe Theatre—from the wrecker’s ball.

In an effort to re-vitalise the city centre the 1908 City Hall building was demolished in 1965 and replaced by a now long-failed shopping mall (which contained inter alia a Coles in the early days of the national company, the first substantial competition of the now long-gone bookstore which had operated in Regina since shortly after its beginning: see photo below) and office block, subsequently taken over by the federal government as office space. This left only Victoria Park as downtown greenery, the area also having previously having had it south of the train station and around the city hall. City Hall was ultimately moved in 1976 from the old Post Office building to a modern office block in the style of the original University of Regina buildings at the new campus, on the western periphery of the city centre on Victoria Avenue, opposite the Courthouse and across 12th Avenue from St Paul's Anglican Cathedral.

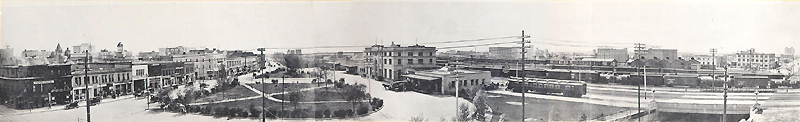
Downtown Regina looking west to South Railway Street; Union Station on the right with trains and tracks behind it.

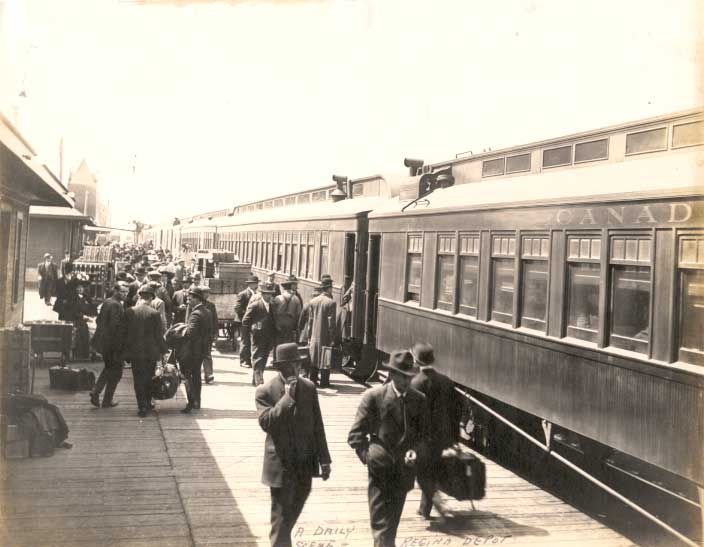
Union Station in Regina, Saskatchewan, circa 1915

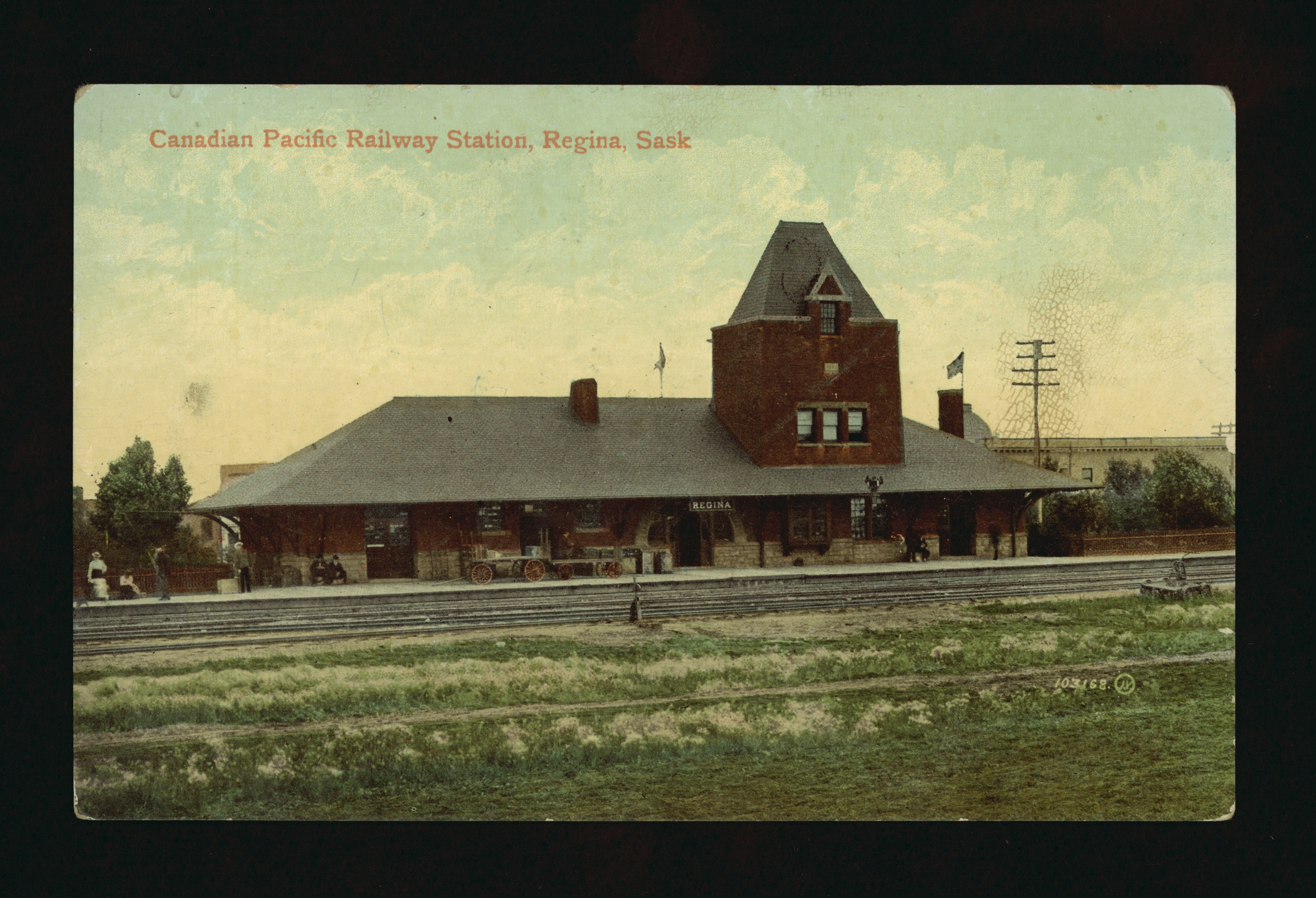
Canadian Pacific Railway Station, Regina, Saskatchewan 1909

Early photos of downtown demonstrate the substantial effort required of early civic authorities and residents to deal with the barren setting of Buffalo Bones—as the site was referred to before being renamed in 1882 after Queen Victoria, Victoria Regina, by her daughter Princess Louise, wife of the Marquess of Lorne, then the Governor General of Canada. Edgar Dewdney, Lieutenant-Governor of the North-West Territories moved the territorial capital from North Battleford to this yet featureless and barren site rather than the anticipated Qu'Appelle or Fort Qu'Appelle, having acquired substantial property on the site to sell for profit.

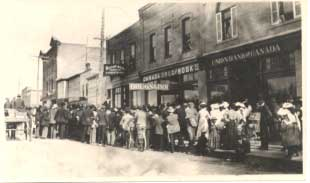
The first site of Canada Drug and Book on South Railway Street, 1905 before it relocated to Scarth Street and remained Regina's only substantial bookstore for many years, apart from an extremely active second-hand bookstore also on South Railway until the mid-1960s.

The railway ... [s]tation [was completed] ... in 1911. Located just east of the former station, it acquired its name because the facilities were designed to accommodate both the Canadian Pacific Railroad and the newly formed Canadian Northern Railway. In 1924, there were twenty-two lines radiating from Regina with up to fifty arrivals and departures a day ... CP Rail sold Union Station to VIA Rail in 1984. VIA started refurbishing the station but cuts by the federal government resulted in passenger routes through Regina being eliminated. In 1991, Union Station was designated as an official heritage site by the federal government [and in]1995 massive renovations were undertaken ... [and] Union Station was transformed into a gambling casino, Casino Regina.

Like the Assiniboia Club, now a public restaurant on the ground floor, the railway station still stands but with quite different use: it is Casino Regina, a public gambling facility.

== Education and culture ==
=== Historic schools ===
At one time Regina had six private high schools associated with religion—three Roman Catholic, one Methodist, one Anglican, one Lutheran—as well as public secondary and junior college education both Roman Catholic and non-sectarian.

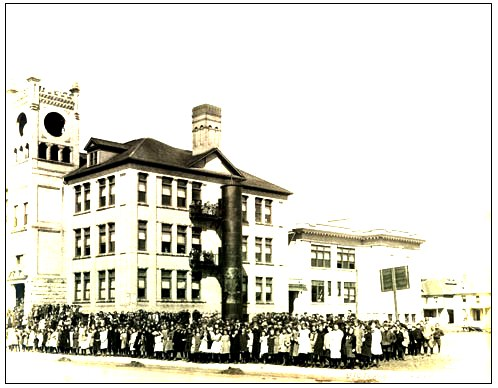
Victoria School at 2025 McIntyre Street between Victoria Avenue and 13th Avenue, whose site was after demolition used for a new YMCA in the 1950s.

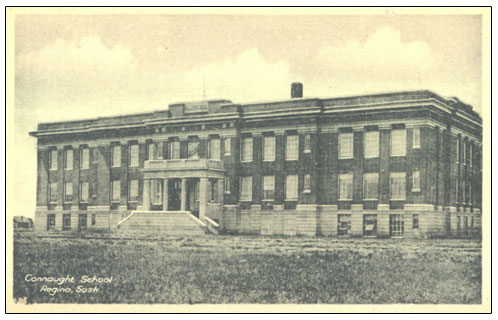
Connaught Public School shortly after construction. Like the major shopping street in New Delhi, named for Duke of Connaught, then Governor General of Canada.

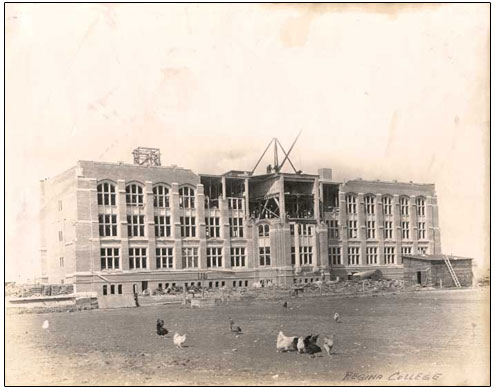
Regina College under construction, 1913. Note chickens in foreground.

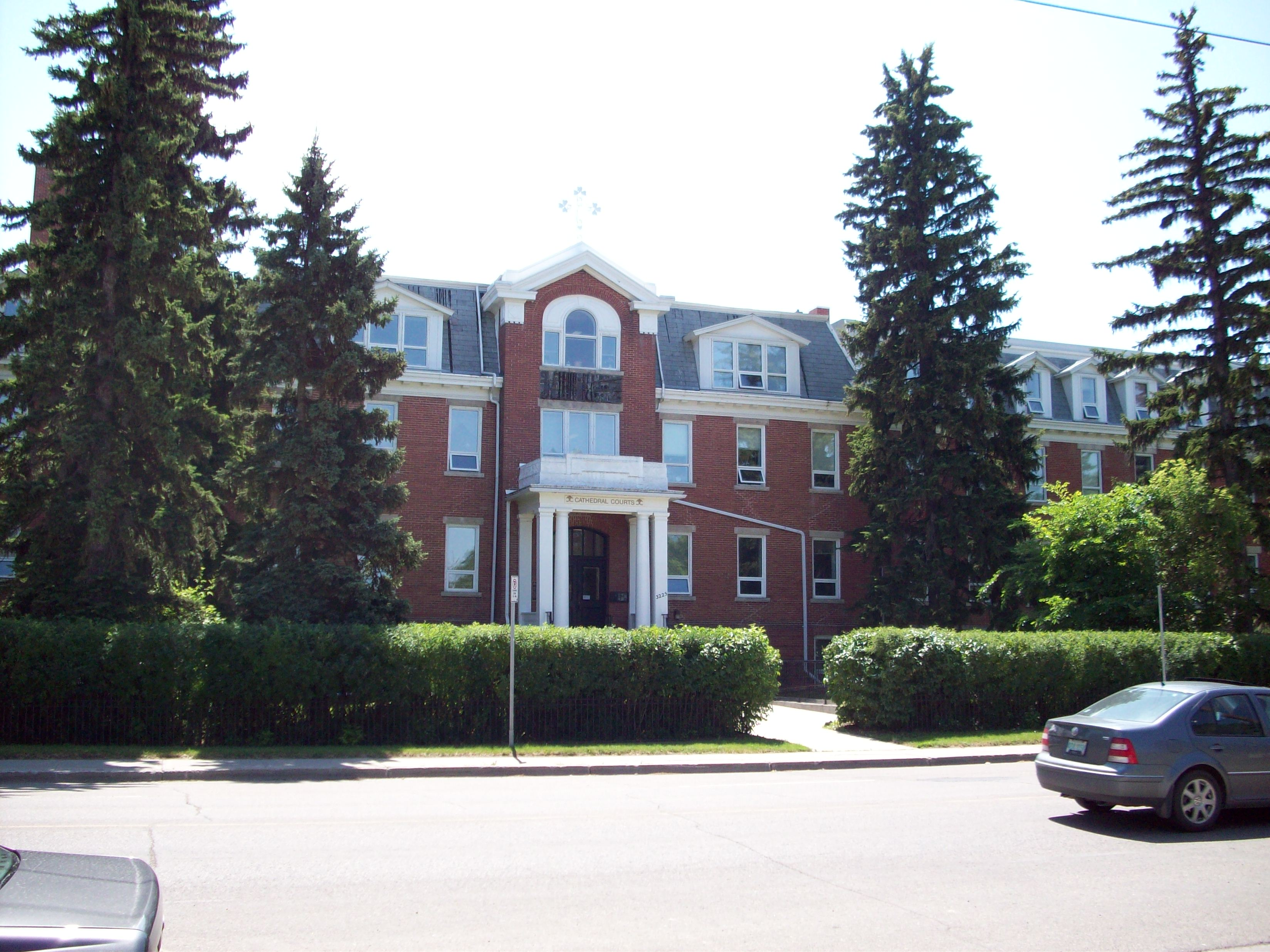
The former Sacred Heart Academy, now converted to private condominium-title residences, but also housing the Roman Catholic Synod Office.

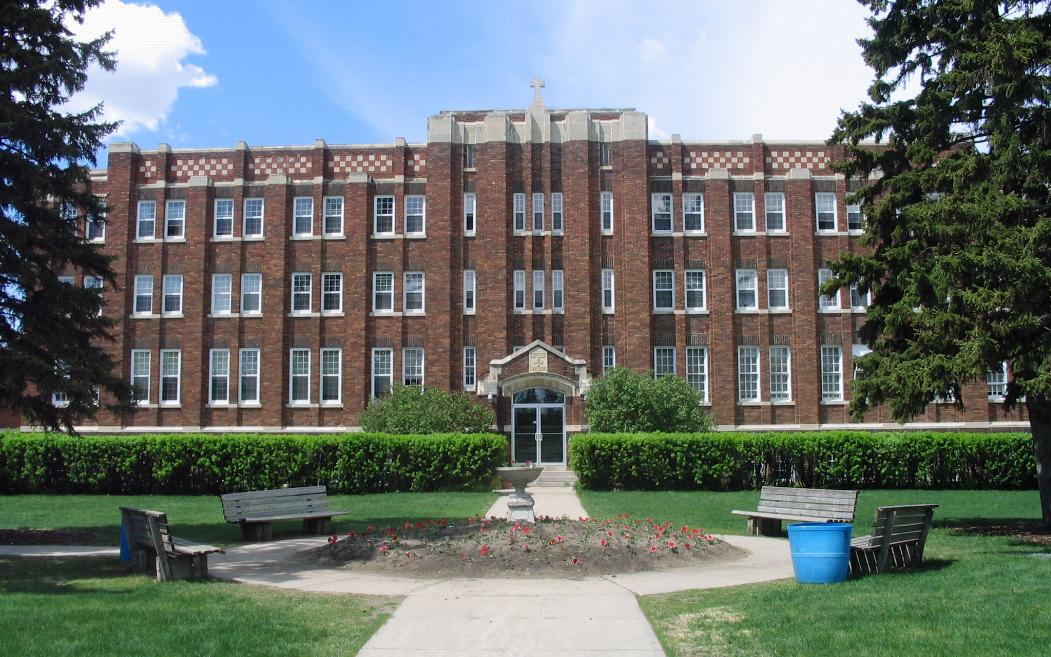
Luther College, Royal Street and Dewdney Avenue, site of first Government House.

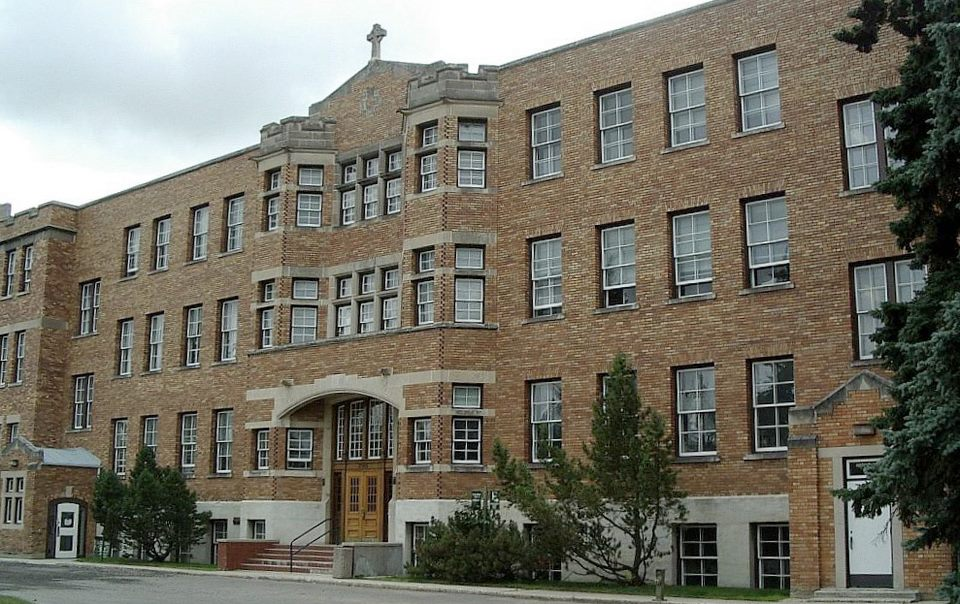
Campion College, corner Albert Street and 23rd Avenue, closed when federated Campion College was opened at Regina Campus cum the University of Regina. It was named for Saint Edmund Campion.

The Regina College Building together with Darke Hall and the old Girls' Residence now constitute the "Old Campus" on College Avenue. As successive faculties have been removed to the New Campus, including the Department of Music which provided intellectual, artistic and facility support to the Regina Conservatory of Music, the Old Campus seeks a new raison d'être and the Conservatory somewhat flounders. Connaught School was named after the Duke of Connaught, then Governor General, and for 105 years was located on Elphinstone Street at 13th Avenue. The public school board decided to demolish it in 2014 and rebuild, rather than preserve the historic structure.

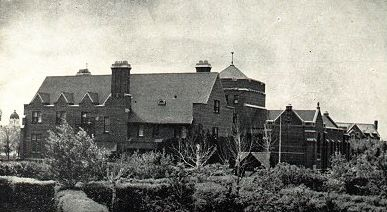
St Chad's College building, originally the theological seminary for the Church of England in Canada's Diocese of Qu'Appelle, later the premises for the Qu'Appelle Diocesan School, renamed St Chad's School in 1962 and closed in 1970

St Chad's Anglican Diocesan School was operated by the Anglican Sisters of St John the Divine on the then-Anglican diocesan property immediately to the east of Regina College on College Avenue until it closed for financial reasons in 1970. (See below, "Germantown and the East End.") The Anglican diocese confronted the realities of its demographic marginality in the 1970s and sold its property to the provincial Crown: the City of Regina is now confronted with the problem of responsibly developing the former Anglican diocesan property. (See below).

The Roman Catholic Jesuit Order operated Campion College, originally a high school with junior college accreditation with the University of Saskatchewan like Regina College, on 23rd Avenue; the Sisters of Our Lady of the Missions operated Sacred Heart College, later Marian High School, to the south of Campion College on Albert Street and Sacred Heart Academy in the West End immediately adjacent to Holy Rosary Cathedral. Historically the Academy was not only a private Roman Catholic girls' high school – Jacqueline Shumiatcher was once a classroom teacher there, Sister Joan Millar a piano teacher before obtaining her PhD and joining the faculty as a music professor at Brandon University; Erika Ritter, a Toronto "playwright, radio dramatist, novelist, humourist, short fiction writer and radio broadcasterand broadcaster," is from Regina and went to Sacred Heart for high school, as did a current a justice of the Saskatchewan Court of Queen's Bench both a music and school student there. All are now closed, though the Campion and Sacred Heart Academy buildings survive with new uses: Campion as a conservative Evangelical Protestant religious school; Sacred Heart Academy as residential condominiums.

The Evangelical Lutheran Church in Canada's Luther College, on the site of the original Government House next to the RCMP Academy, Depot Division, is the one remaining historic private school in Regina. Campion College no longer operates a high school, though its original building is now used as a private school run by another denomination; Campion College is now a federated college at the University of Regina, as is Luther College.

=== Theatres and concert halls ===
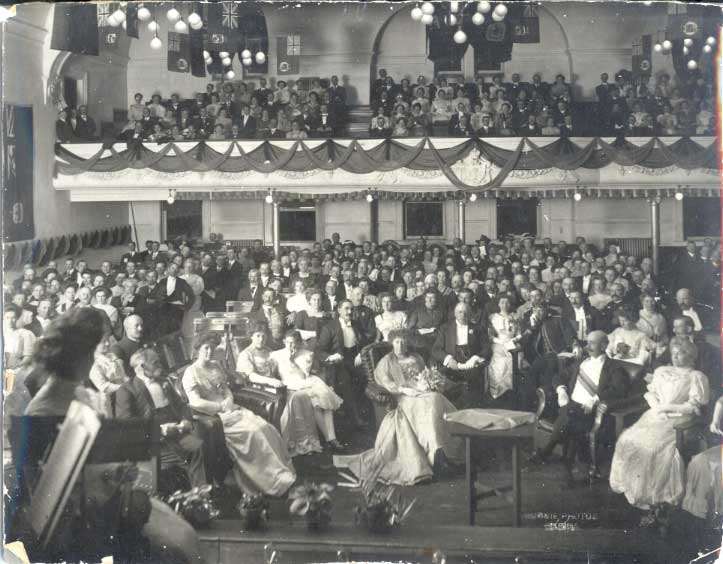
Ballroom, Old City Hall, 1909. Photo shows reception for Earl Grey, with Lieutenant-Governor Forget, Judge Wetmore and Premier Walter Scott.

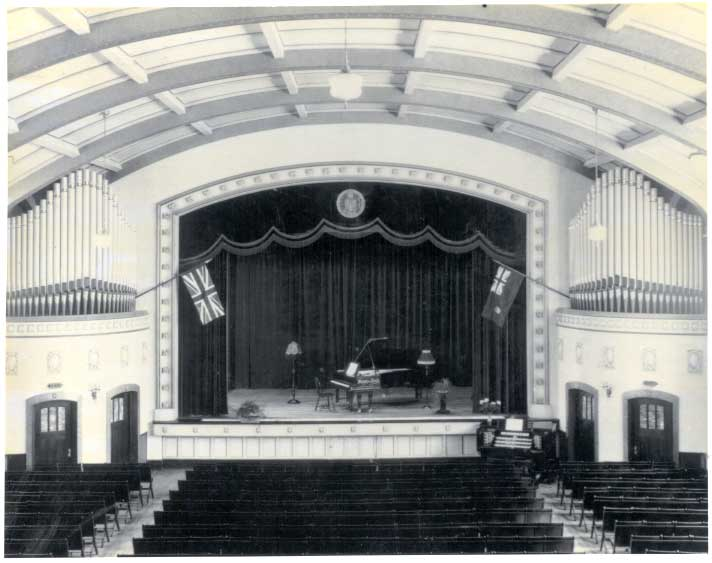
Interior of Darke Hall. It remains the principal concert and lecture venue on the Old Campus of the University of Regina. Note organ pipes on auditorium side of the stage wings.

Darke Hall, a civic theatre and concert hall adjacent to Regina College, was donated by Francis Nicholson Darke. In the pre-television era Regina, like other comparably sized cities throughout North America, was served by legitimate theatre buildings where both touring professional productions and local amateur productions were staged as well as by numerous movie houses: such public entertainments were offered in an abundance that seems astonishing in the 21st century city which is several times larger. The 1908 City Hall, as was customary at the time, and as with the obviously substantially larger (and surviving) Town Halls of London, New York City, Sydney and Brisbane, contained a large central theatre and concert hall-cum-ballroom. Mr Darke also donated the carillon of chimes to the then-Methodist, now United Church of Canada Metropolitan Church in downtown Regina which is still heard. Darke Hall opened in 1929. From 1929 until 1970 on the opening of the Saskatchewan Centre of the Arts (now the Conexus Arts Centre) it was the concert hall of the Regina Symphony Orchestra.

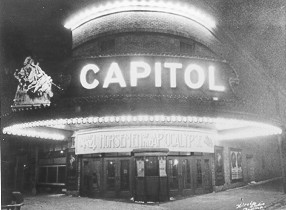
The Capitol Theatre in 1922: opened in 1921 and was demolished in 1992.

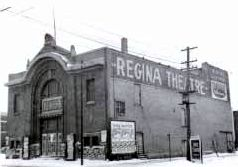
The Regina Theatre, 12th Avenue and Hamilton Street, previously on the site of the old Hudson's Bay department store, opened in 1910

It remains the recital and concert hall for the Regina Conservatory of Music and the University of Regina's Department of Music as well as the venue for amateur theatricals and public lectures. Darke Hall was for many years Regina’s principal concert hall and theatre, particularly after:

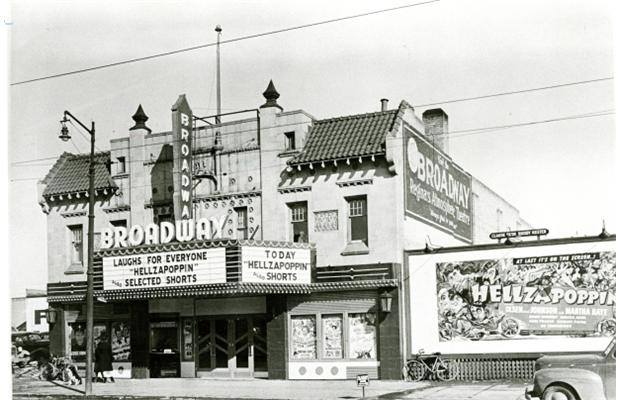
Broadway Theatre, Broad Street. Opened 1930, closed 1931–41 because of the Great Depression but vastly successful until final closure in 1981. Here showing "Hellzapoppin,'" 1941

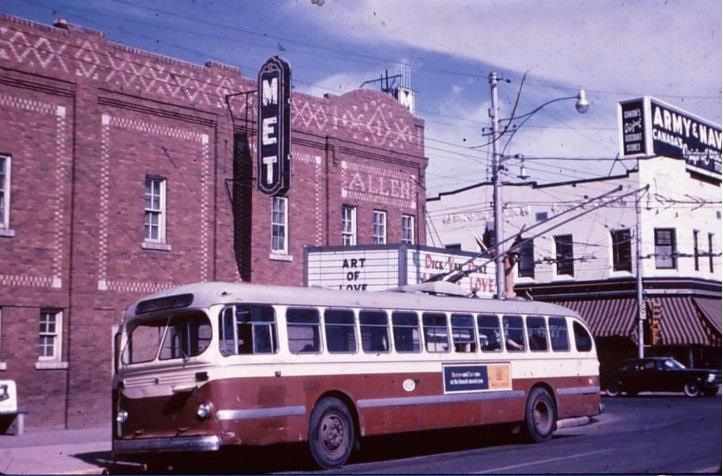
Metropolitan Theatre, summer 1965 when "Art of Love" with Dick Van Dyke showing. Originally the Allen Theatre, it opened December 30, 1918. It was closed and for sale in 1987

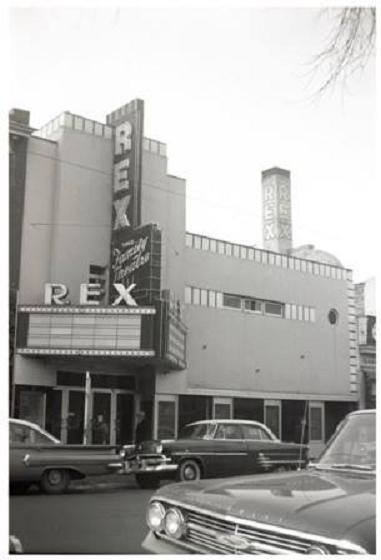
Rex film theatre, the second on site after first burned in 1938

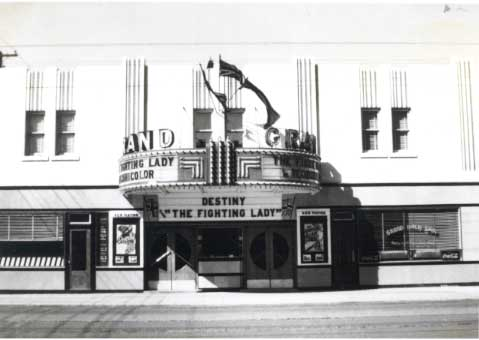
Regina Grand Theatre opened in 1912 and closed in 1957 on 11th Avenue and like other cinemas housing both stage productions and moving pictures. Here in 1940

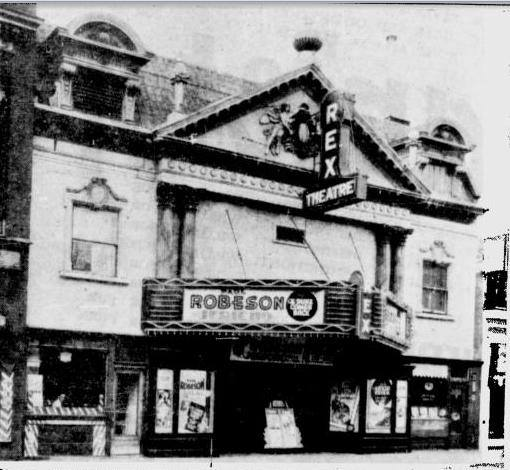
Original Rex Theatre destroyed by fire 1938

By the 1980s, Famous Players, which had acquired the Capitol, by then the last historic stage-theatre and cinema remaining in the central business district, was in financial trouble and desperately divided the Cap in half to make a poor-man's multiplex; ultimately the Cap itself was closed. By the time of its demolition in 1992 it was the last of many downtown movie theatres which had once thrived — the Regina Theatre, the Rex, the Grand, the Unique, the Roseland, the Elite, the Princess, the Lux, the Gaiety, the Broadway, the Roxy,

(a) The destruction by fire in 1939 of the 800-seat Regina Theatre on the corner of 12th Avenue and Hamilton (now the site of the old Hudson's Bay Company department store building). It was home from 1910 to the Regina Operatic Society, the Regina Orchestral Society and travelling vaudeville and stage plays. The Regina Theatre doubled as a cinema and a legitimate theatre; famous travelling troupes which crossed Canada on the CPR before cinema and television performed there. One was being performed in by Boris Karloff, when the Regina Cyclone struck in 1912; he famously took part in the exercise of helping out immediately afterwards. And

(b) The demolition of Old City Hall in 1965, whose ballroom had provided a multi-purpose space used for civic receptions, concerts, theatre, balls and indeed boxing.

The Army & Navy across 11th Avenue is also now long-closed and demolished, despite having been renovated and doubled in size in 1969. Downtown cinemas included the Regina, the Grand and, both on Broad Street, the 1000-seat Metropolitan and the Broadway Theatres. The Broadway was Regina's first "all-talkie" movie theatre, built by theatre owner and manager Harry Bercovich. Styled in the "Spanish villa" theme inside and outside, it opened on January 1, 1930. However, the theatre was closed little more than a year later because of the Great Depression. It would remain closed until it finally reopened in 1941.

"Bercovich ... , however ... managed the Rex Theatre and made use of his canny entrepreneurial skills to attract business even in the midst of the Depression. He held "Bank Nights" weekly at the Rex, giving away door prizes to attract business. He gave away silverware and dishes as well, patrons having to return each week in order to collect the complete set of dishes or silverware." The theatre was sold to the Famous Players theatre chain in 1969. It stayed open until 1981, when it closed permanently. The building was demolished in the early 1990s. The largest of all, the 1500-seat Capitol Theatre, built in 1921, doubled as a movie house and live stage venue and after the Regina Theatre burned to the ground the Capitol was Regina's principal downtown venue for "legitimate" theatre: the famous annual Canadian travelling revue "Spring Thaw" was staged here through the 1950s. "The theatre boasted its own 10-person orchestra to accompany the silent movies and vaudeville acts that were popular at the time. In 1940, the Capitol Theatre had an evening of Hollywood-style glamour when it hosted the world premiere of the movie 'North West Mounted Police.'"

The 1000-seat Metropolitan and the Cap itself. An office tower now occupies the site; the old Hudson's Bay Department store building, on the site of the Regina Theatre, is now also occupied by offices.

With the building of the Saskatchewan Centre of the Arts in Wascana Centre on the south shore of Wascana Lake immediately adjacent to the new campus of the University of Saskatchewan, Regina Campus and well outside the Regina Central Business District, both highbrow and mainstream entertainment were comprehensively removed from the city centre, largely completing the process begun with the destruction of the Regina Theatre and the demolition of Old City Hall.

One exception is the Globe Theatre. In 1981 it moved downtown from the Centre of the Arts on the north-east shore of Wascana Lake in Wascana Centre, in Regina terms far from the city centre, after a decade there, into the old Post Office building at the southeast corner of 11th Avenue and Scarth Street. It is now the only major entertainment venue in the city centre apart from Casino Regina in the former CPR Union train station. City planners seeking to revitalise the downtown business district must contend with the consequences of decisions made by predecessors who directed the city's entertainment facilities away from the city centre.

=== Gallery of theatres indoors ===
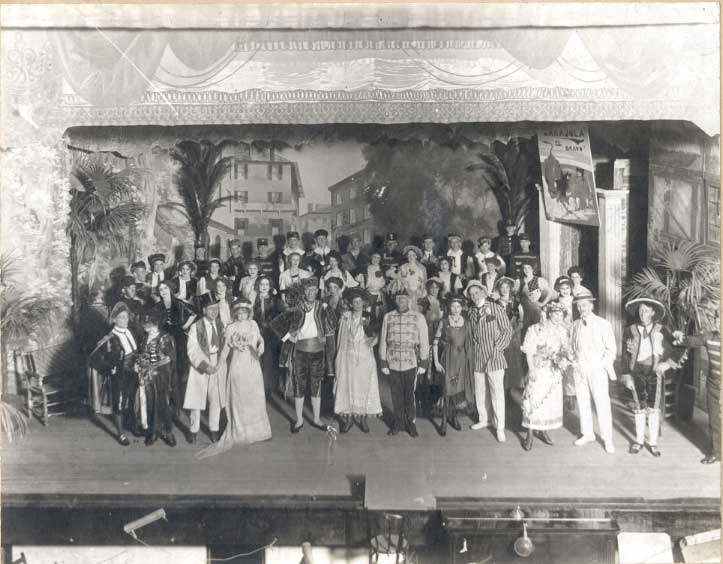
Production of the Regina Operatic Society at the Regina Theatre, 1913: corner of Hamilton Street and 12th Avenue, later the site of the Hudson's Bay Company department store

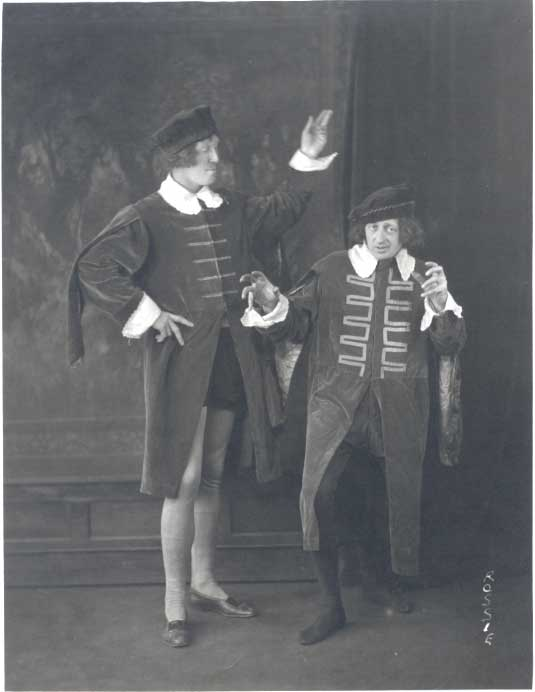
Regina Theatre's 1922 production of "Merry England"

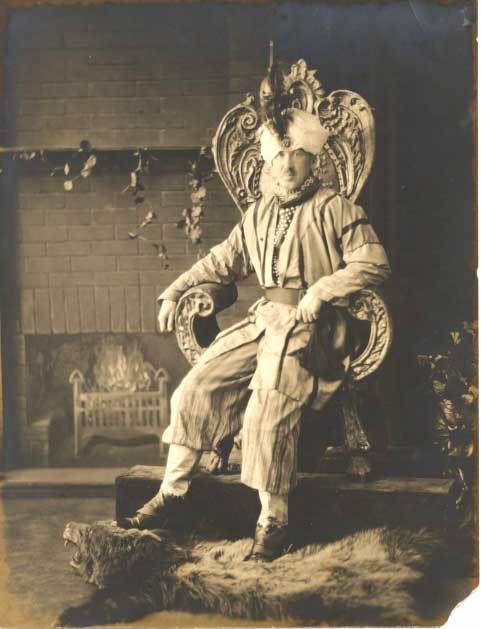
Freddie Rowan in "Singalee," Regina Theatre 1925

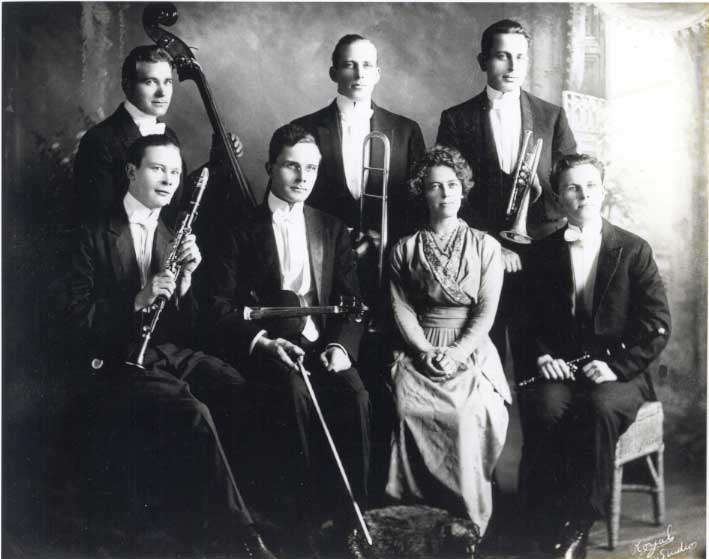
The Rose Theatre featured an orchestra that played to accompany the silent movies that aired on its screen. The orchestra was quite popular in Regina and frequently provided entertainment for local events

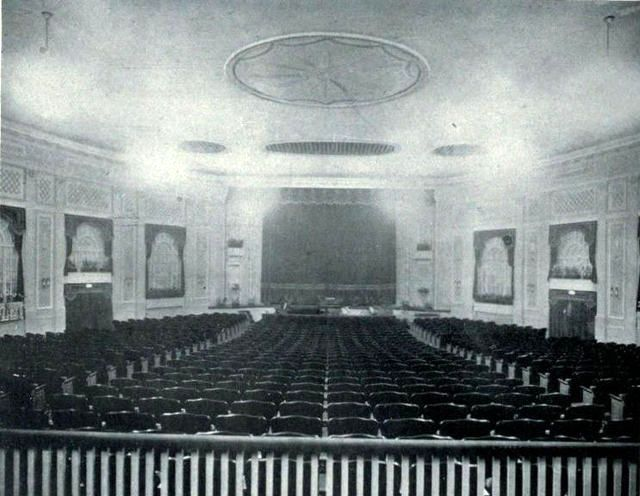
The Allen Theatre, 1701 Broad Street, opened December 30, 1918. Later renamed Metropolitan Theatre, it was closed and for sale in 1987. Photo of the exterior above

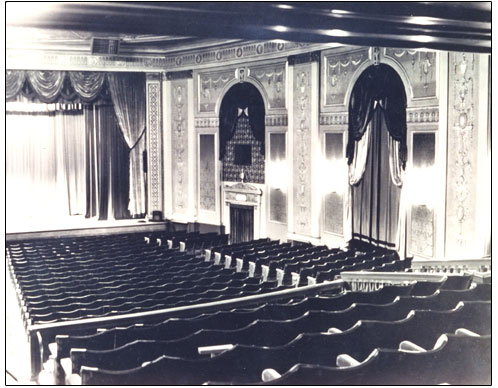
Capitol Theatre, 12th Avenue and Scarth Street, built in 1921, here pictured in 1929

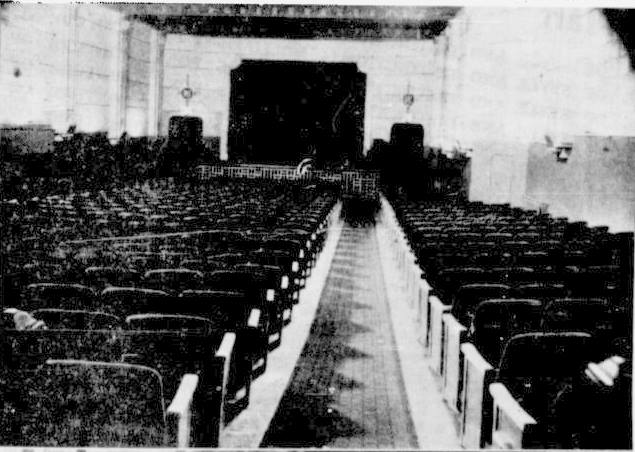
Rex Theatre second version in 1958 interior

=== Victoria Park and surrounding buildings ===
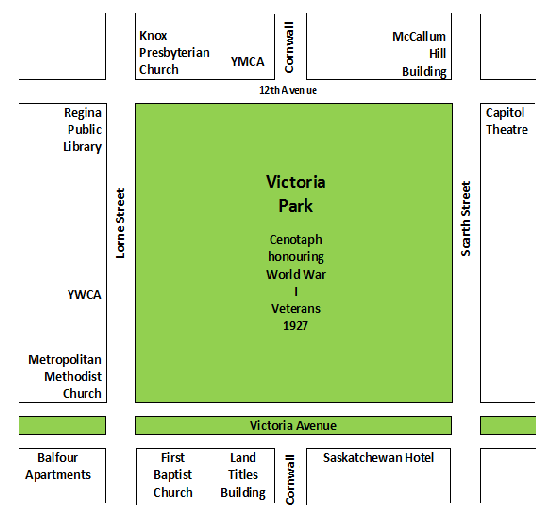
Victoria Park and surrounding buildings on Victoria Avenue, Lorne Street, Scarth Street and 12th Avenue, Regina circa 1927.

Davin Fountain in Victoria Park, circa 1925.

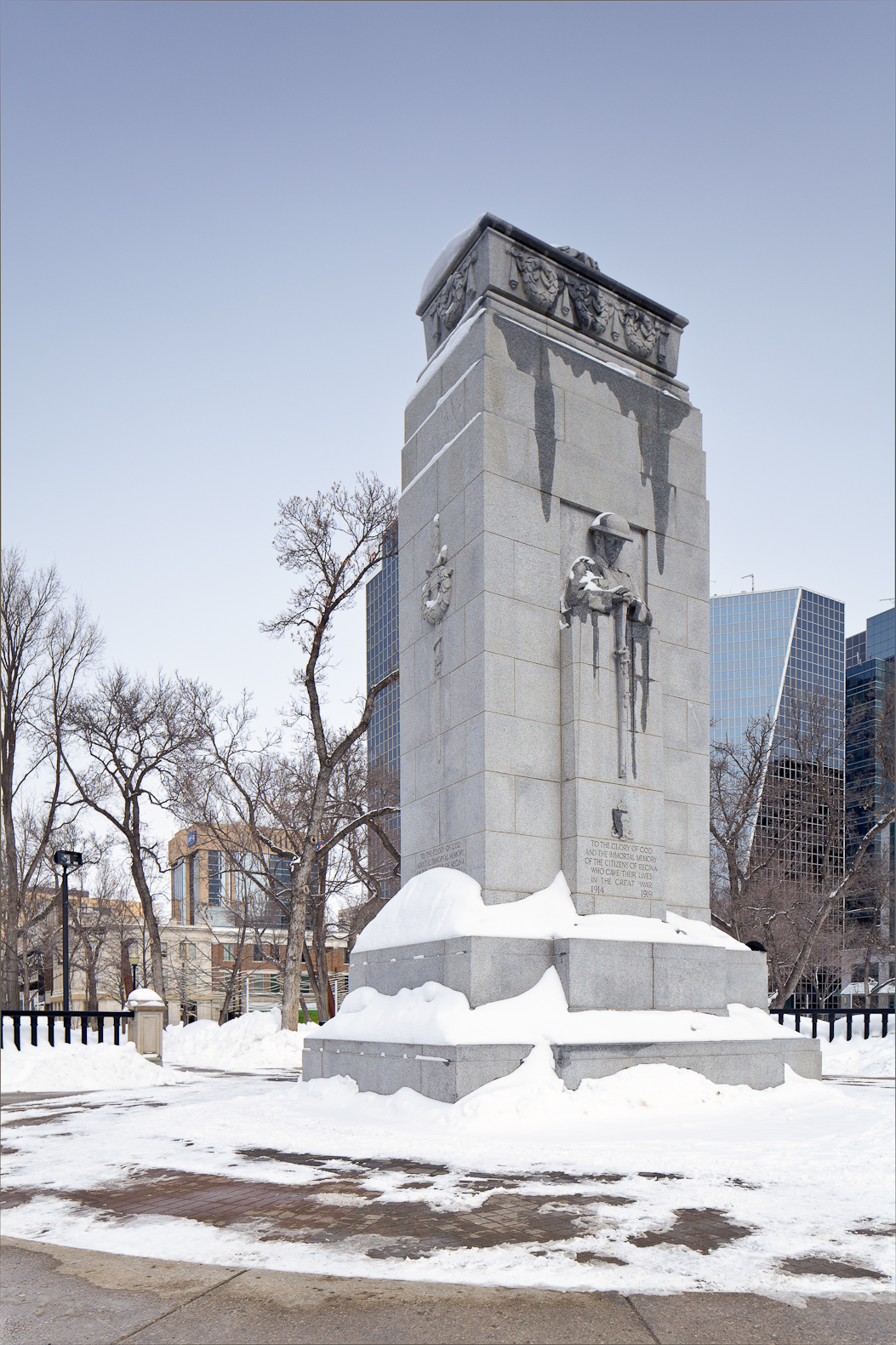
Victoria Park Cenotaph.

At "the start of the twentieth century [a] much more attractive park [than Victoria Park was] the CPR Gardens, commonly referred to as Stanley Park. This plot of land boasted trees, shrubs and flowers: from its beginning there was difficulty establishing parklands and recreational areas in Regina, it lacking natural rolling land, trees, shrubs and apart from the spring run-off Wascana Creek and even smaller and shorter creeks, natural flowing water. The little park beautified the land right next to the CPR's main depot in Regina, Union Station. (Today, this site is ... the parking lot of Casino Regina.)"

Victoria Park quickly became the location of surrounding facilities and attractions: the First Baptist Church; Metropolitan Methodist; the YWCA; Carnegie Library, built as in many cities of North America and the United Kingdom with a grant from the Carnegie Foundation; the McCallum Hill Building, an early office building of downtown Regina; the Capitol Theatre; the Hotel Saskatchewan. First Baptist, Metropolitan Methodist, Carnegie Library, Knox Presbyterian and the YMCA were all destroyed in the 1912 Regina "Cyclone" but quickly rebuilt — the Library with the help of a further Carnegie grant. It was demolished and replaced in 1962 by an impressively large though architecturally undistinguished building on the same site at Lorne Street and 12th Avenue which, like the Court of Appeal and Queens Bench building on Victoria Avenue, preserves remnants of its predecessor in its forecourt. The institution of amply endowed public libraries became well established in Regina and Regina burgesses quickly became inured to the idea of such facilities being worthwhile public facilities and worthy of substantial public endowment. Latterly the Regina City Council has sought to cut costs by proposing to close neighbourhood libraries, including the Connaught Library in the West End (latterly dubbed the "Cathedral Area"), to general public condemnation.

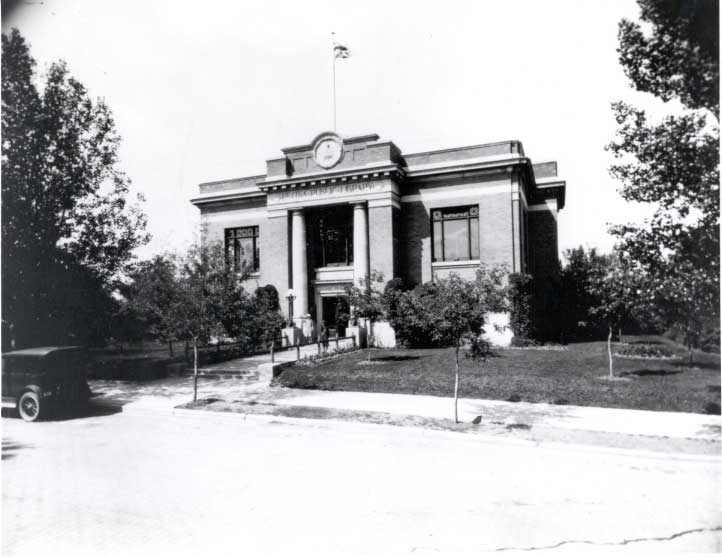
Carnegie Library, 1925

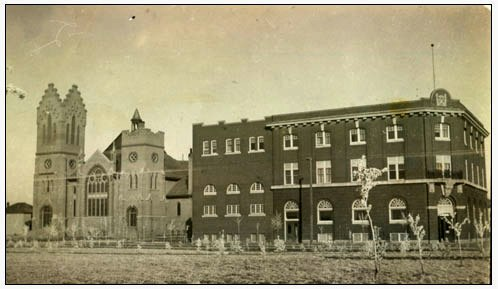
Knox Presbyterian Church and YMCA circa 1912 prior to destruction of both in the 1912 "Cyclone"

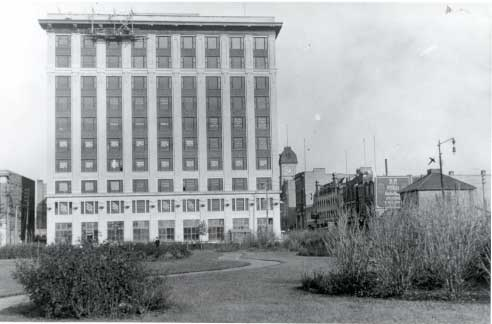
McCallum Hill Building 1913, north of the northeast corner of the park

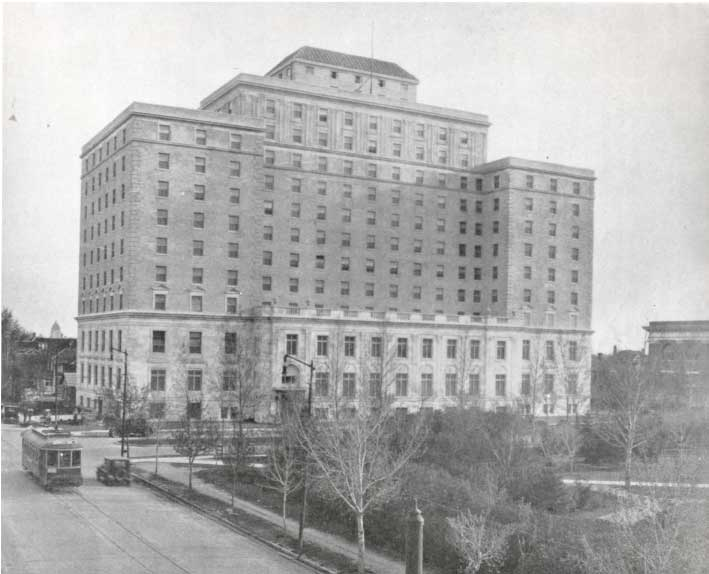
Hotel Saskatchewan, circa 1930

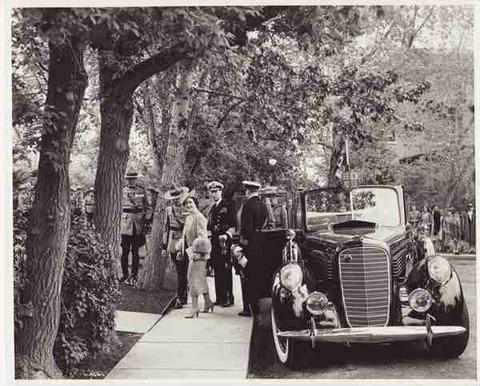
King George VI and Queen Elizabeth on Victoria Avenue about to enter Victoria Park, 1939

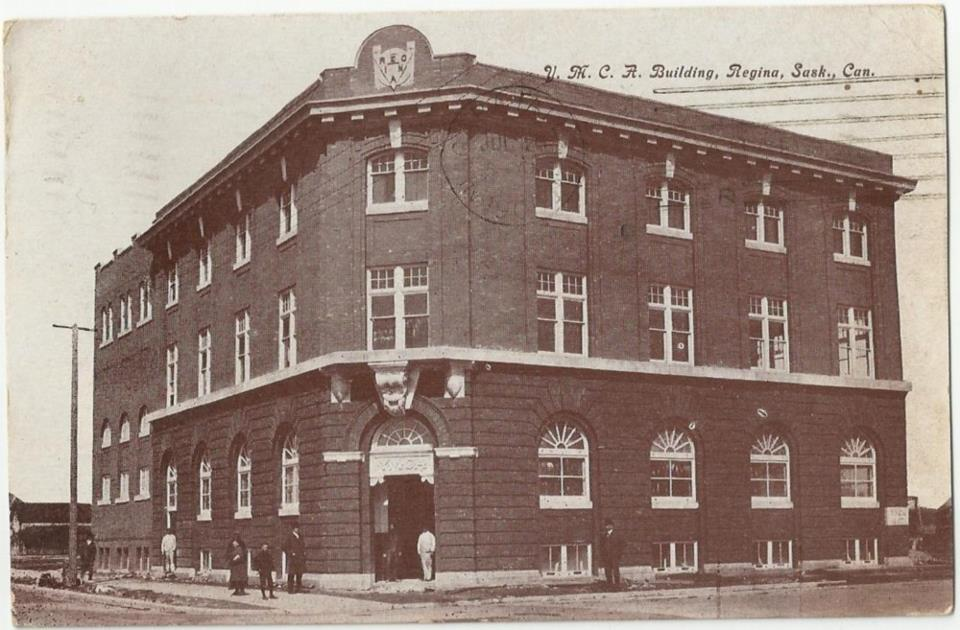
Regina YMCA building on 12th Avenue across from Victoria Park and next door to Knox Presbyterian Church. Replaced in the 1950s.

The McCallum Hill Building was constructed in 1913 on the north side of the street from the northeast corner of the park. For many years it was the largest private office building in the city and the tallest building in Saskatchewan at ten storeys high, of course only rivaled in height and conspicuousness within the province by the Hotel Saskatchewan in Regina and Saskatoon’s Bessborough Hotel. Real estate developers E.A. McCallum, E. M. McCallum and Walter H.A. Hill began construction of the McCallum-Hill office building in 1912.

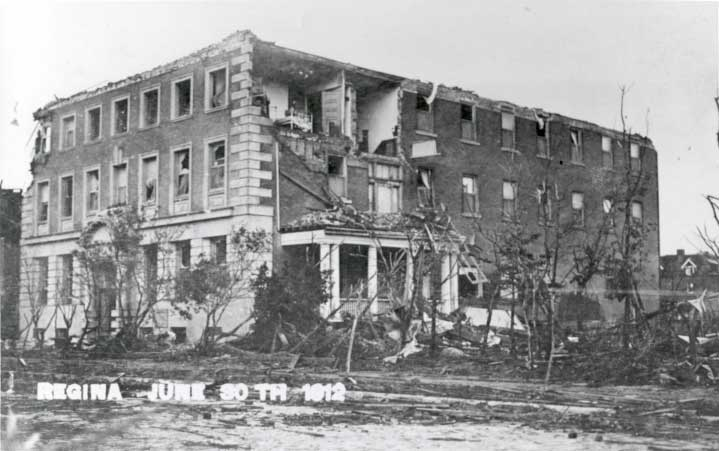
YWCA immediately north of Metropolitan Methodist Church on Lorne Street, just after the 1912 "Regina Cyclone." Not in good condition but a good photo of the building in 1912.

The McCallum-Hill Building was imploded in six seconds with 200 pounds of explosives in 1982 and replaced by the 22-storey McCallum Hill Centre Tower I and Tower II, both on Scarth Street. Knox Presbyterian, Metropolitan Methodist and First Baptist were also across the street from Victoria Park, the latter two still standing (see below), as is the Hotel Saskatchewan. Completed in 1927, the Hotel Saskatchewan was in part constructed from building materials of the never-completed Chateau Qu'Appelle at the corner of Albert Street and 16th Avenue (later renamed College Avenue) on what became the grounds of the Royal Saskatchewan Museum. Besides use for accommodation, dining, entertainment and facilities for wedding receptions and other such functions, it immediately replaced use of Government House for accommodating official visitors including political leaders and royalty: George VI and Queen Elizabeth, for example, stayed there rather than in Government House when they were in Regina during their six-week tour across Canada and back again by train. Also on the opposite sides of streets from Victoria Park were the now long-demolished Capitol Theatre (opened in 1921: photos above in theatre section) and the first YMCA and YWCA. Originally owned by the CPR, though now part of the Radisson Hotels chain, it was much simpler in style and less expensive to build than famous earlier-built CPR and CNR hotels but also than Saskatoon's Bessborough Hotel, built from 1928 to 1932. Nevertheless, it was and remains a luxury hotel, since its 1927 a preferred accommodation for prominent visitors including members of the Royal Family, its night club long an entertainment centre and its dining room favoured for luxurious wedding receptions.

=== Gallery of central business district, turn of the 20th century through the 1930s ===
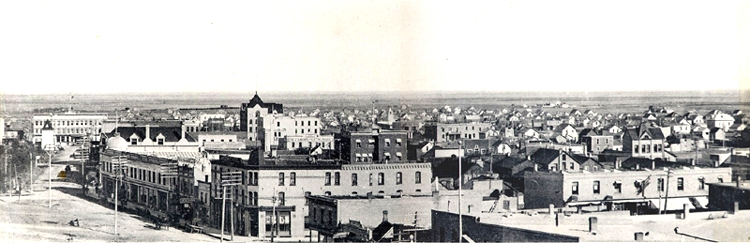
South Railway Street running back towards Broad Street

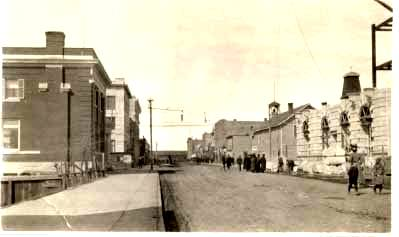
East down 11th Avenue from Scarth Street, 1906. On the right is the Post Office under construction

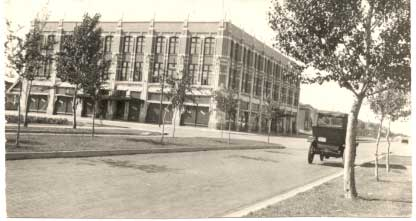
Sherwood Department Store, 1913. Building remains in use as Saskatchewan Wheat Pool Building

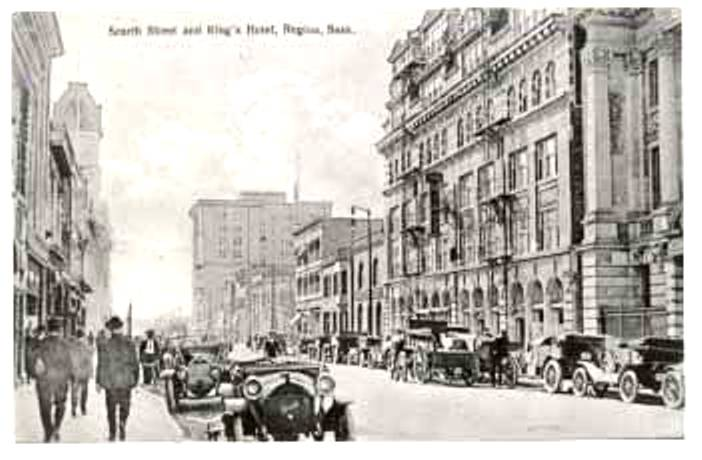
Scarth Street and King's Hotel, 1920

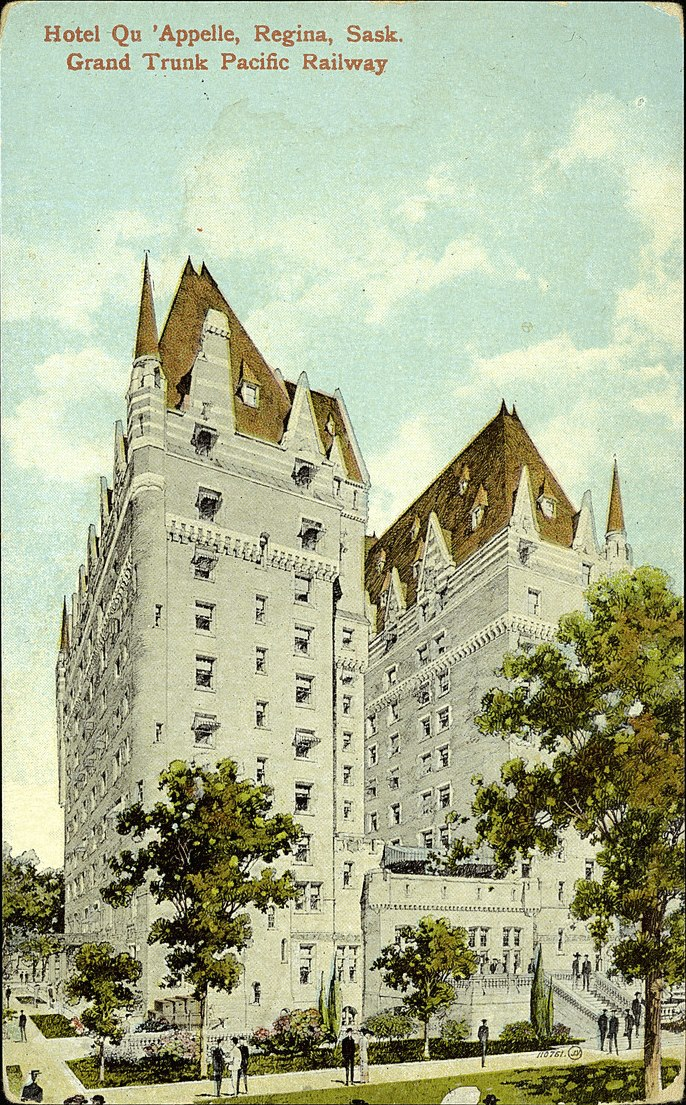
Postcard of the building-in-progress Chateau Qu'Appelle published and distributed in or about 1913.

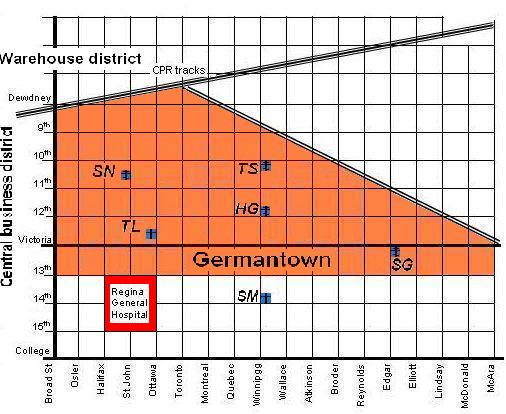
Map of Germantown, approx. Broad Street east to Winnipeg Street and beyond, and 13th Avenue north to the CPR Yards. TL = Trinity Lutheran (old building); HG = Ukrainian Orthodox Church of the Descent of the Holy Ghost; TS = Holy Trinity Serbian Orthodox Church; SG = St George's Romanian Orthodox Cathedral; SN = St Nicholas's Romanian Orthodox Church; SM = St Matthew's Anglican Church, outside Germantown. The former Qu'Appelle Diocesan property, the site of St Chad's School, the Diocesan administrative buildings and the bishop's palace and the intended site of a never-built Anglican cathedral, now being commercially re-developed, is immediately to the southwest across College Avenue and to the east of Broad Street.

== Germantown and the East End ==
=== Germantown proper ===
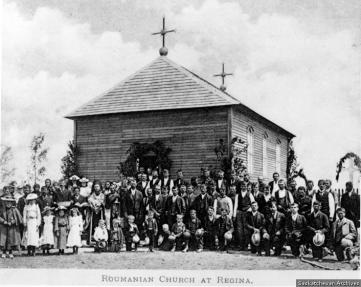
St Nicholas's Romanian Orthodox Church, 1904

The area known as Germantown (Broad Street east to Winnipeg Street and beyond, and 13th Avenue north to the CPR Yards) was settled by continental Europeans—Germans, Romanians, Hungarians, Serbs, Ukrainians, Poles, essentially anyone neither British Isles, French nor aboriginal in ancestry. In the early-predominant Anglo-Celtic mainstream non-francophone continental Europeans whatever their origin were generally referred to either as "Galicians" (Galicia at the time actually being Austrian Poland) or as "Germans."

Europeans became established around the former Market Square (now the location of the Regina city police station on Osler Street between 10th and 11th Avenues) by 1892. German, Ukrainian, Romanian and Serbian religious, secular and educational institutions and services were early established in the neighbourhood—including St Nicholas's Romanian Orthodox Church (established in 1902), the oldest Romanian Orthodox parish in North America; St George's Cathedral (founded in 1914 though the present building dates from the early 1960s), the episcopal seat of the Romanian Orthodox Bishop of Regina; and the now long-demolished Holy Trinity Serbian Orthodox Church and the Ukrainian Orthodox Church of the Descent of the Holy Ghost, both formerly on Winnipeg Street.

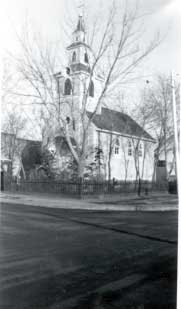
Holy Trinity Serbian Orthodox Church, Winnipeg Street in the heart of Germantown

Beth Jacob Synagogue, established in 1905 and now re-located to South Regina, was originally also in Germantown. "The Depression of the 1930s precluded plans to build a larger synagogue to accommodate the growing needs of the community, and the war years saw the community preoccupied along with the rest of Regina in the war effort. Finally, in April 1948, the decision was made to build a new synagogue, and on September 3, 1950, the building was officially opened" on Victoria Avenue at Osler Street, immediately to the east of Broad Street Park (since the 1960s occupied by a shopping mall and the Regina Inn). The building has long been closed and given other use by its purchasers. The synagogue relocated to the southwest end of town, the population of practising Jews as substantially declined and there is no longer a resident rabbi. This has been attributed to steadier and more reliable vitality elsewhere, which caused Regina’s entire population to remain the same for long periods and at times fall; it is also attributable both to substantial intermarriage between Regina Jews and gentiles and a decline in religious observance among most traditionally mainstream faiths among Canadians.

Regina's Anglo-Saxon and Celtic élite grievously neglected Germantown in the early days and basic services of water and sewerage came scandalously late to the precinct. Many residents of the Germantown quarter of Regina lived in squalid shacks without basic services till well into the 20th century, when issues of loyalty to the British Crown during the First World War were comprehensively resolved in the favour of the residents' complete Canadian-ness. By the 1960s invidious past ethnic prejudice had long since passed and Ukrainian food had become pan-prairie cuisine, with sour cabbage and frozen perogies amply available in Regina supermarkets. Apart from German Lutheran and Roman Catholic establishments throughout Regina, however, European churches and cultural clubs remain concentrated in Germantown.

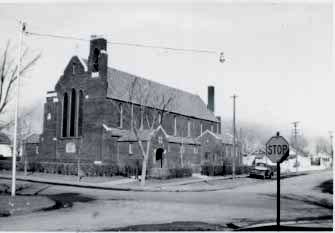
St. Matthew's Anglican Church, 2165 Winnipeg Street, Regina's East end. The church parish came into being when east-side denizens formed a Sunday school in 1907; construction was completed on the new church building in 1926.

Trinity Lutheran Church—now occupying a large but undistinguished A-frame building on Ottawa Street in the heart of Germantown—remains the centre of Regina's Lutheran constituency, though Canadian Lutheranism, while maintaining the historic episcopacy and indeed being in full communion with the Anglican Church of Canada, does not designate metropolitan churches as cathedrals. Trinity for many years maintained a traditional German parish church in Germantown; in due course, when it had built its new modern building, it sold its impressive German pipe organ to an Anglican parish church.

At the southern periphery of Germantown is an Anglo-Saxon-Celtic neighbourhood. St Matthew's Anglican Church remains on 14th Avenue and Winnipeg Street; Carmichael United Church on 13th Avenue immediately adjacent to Regina General Hospital, built in 1920 as Carmichael Presbyterian and later together with the neighboring Wesley Methodist Church becoming a congregation of United Church, closed in 1996. Its Sunday morning services were broadcast on radio and widely listened to by farm families after the United Church closed its rural churches in the early 1950s. Its chancel furniture was acquired by the University of Regina for use at convocation ceremonies, a little-noted historic link with the university's origins as a Methodist and after June 1925 United Church denominational college.

=== The Qu'Appelle diocesan property ===
Immediately adjacent to Germantown, to the south of College Avenue, is the former Anglican Diocesan property, containing the former Qu'Appelle Diocesan School and Anglican nunnery (with the historic St Chad's Chapel), a former theological college, administrative buildings, old people's home and bishop's palace. The property had been acquired by the Church of England (as it then was) as a mission field of the English Diocese of Lichfield. When it became apparent that the original see "city" of Qu'Appelle had been passed over as the metropole for the new District of Assiniboia and Province of Saskatchewan and that Regina would be the principal city of southern Saskatchewan the Diocese relocated its headquarters. The once-mooted Anglican cathedral is outlined in caragana hedges diagonally at the corner of Broad Street and College Avenue. (By 1974 it was clear that funds and parishioners would never be sufficient for building a cathedral and St. Paul's at the corner of 12th Avenue and McIntyre Street, pro-cathedral from 1944 in place of the original pro-cathedral in Qu'Appelle itself, would not be succeeded by a substantially sized building and was named cathedral.

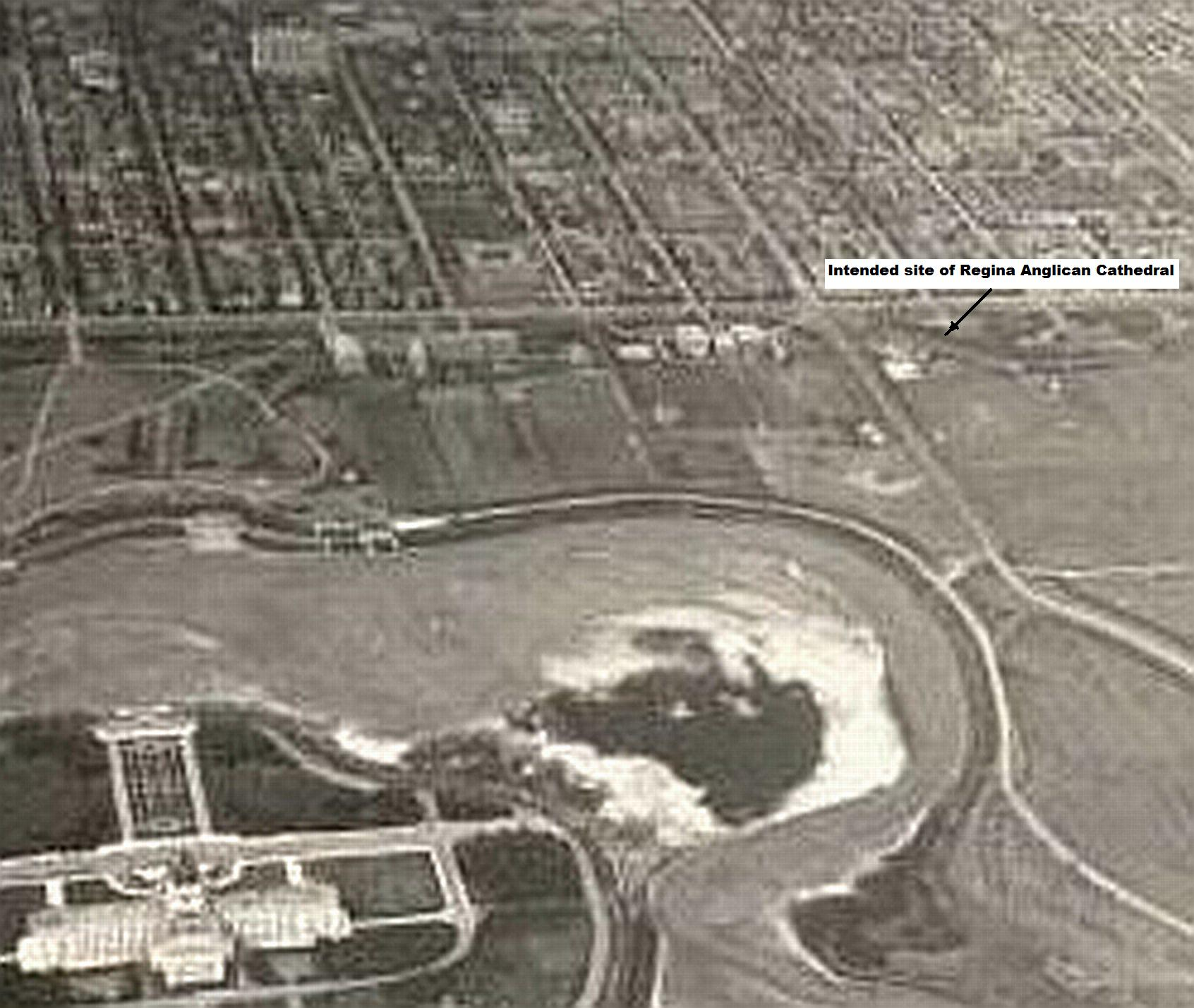
The originally intended site of Regina's Anglican cathedral at the corner of Broad Street and College Avenue.

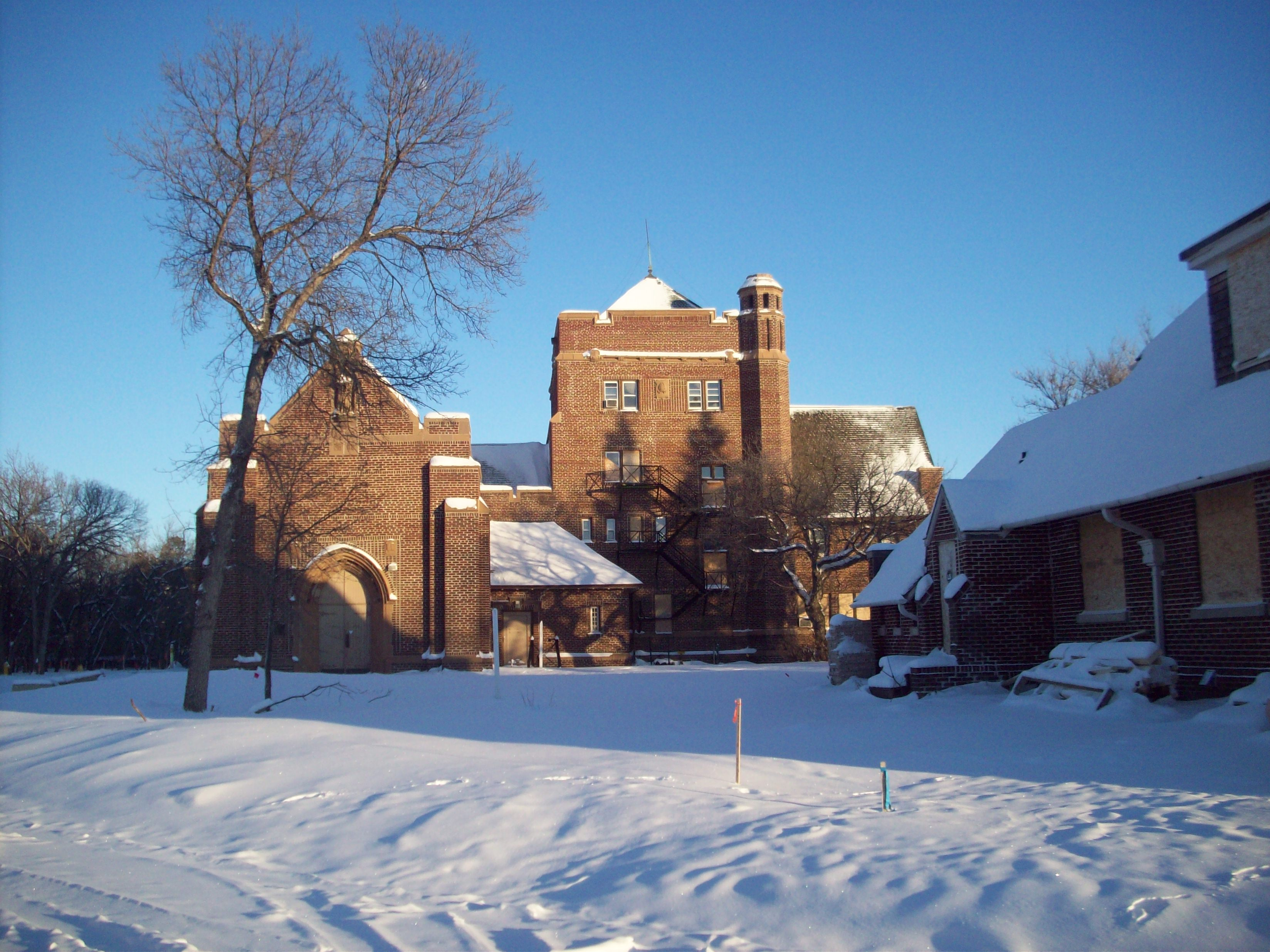
St Chad's exterior, 2010. Note boarded up and disused former Synod office to the right in the photo.

The property was sold to the provincial crown in the 1970s by way of finally obtaining fiscal self-reliance: the Anglican Diocese of Qu'Appelle was originally a mission field of the English Diocese of Lichfield and this was increasingly anomalous. For a time the Diocese leased back the property; it has now been sold for commercial and residential redevelopment; the current Regina Development plan mandates that it be "[ensured] that new development allows for views into the site from Broad Street to significant heritage features, especially the tower of St. Chad’s."

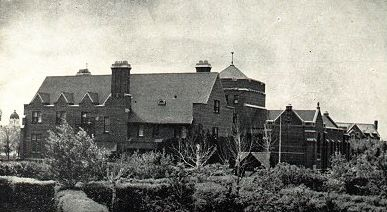
St Chad's College building, originally the theological seminary for the Diocese of Qu'Appelle, later the premises for the Qu'Appelle Diocesan School, renamed St Chad's School in 1962 and closed in 1970

On the southeastern periphery of Germantown, where British Isles-descended Canadians settled after the turn of the century is St Matthew's Anglican Church, one of only three substantial historic Anglican parish churches in Regina; across College Avenue immediately to the South of Germantown, is the former Anglican Diocesan property. It contains the former Qu'Appelle Diocesan School (whose premises were originally a theological seminary for the training of clergy) and Anglican nunnery (with the historic St Chad's Chapel), diocesan administrative buildings, an old people's home and the bishop's palace. The property had been acquired by the Church of England (as it then was) when it became apparent that the original see "city" of Qu'Appelle had been passed over as the metropole for the new District of Assiniboia and Province of Saskatchewan.

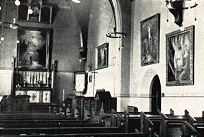
St Chad's chapel interior. When St Chad's School closed in 1970 the bishop, whose residence was at the adjacent Bishop's Court, and the diocesan staff continued to use the chapel privately.

The site of the once-mooted but never-begun Anglican cathedral is outlined in caragana hedges diagonally at the corner of Broad Street and College Avenue. Qu'Appelle Diocesan School promotional brochures referred to the entire diocesan land and premises as "the Cathedral property." The original grand scheme of building a Regina cathedral on the Qu'Appelle Diocesan property was comprehensively abandoned in 1974 when the modest downtown parish church of St Paul's (the pro-cathedral since 1944) was designated the cathedral of the Qu'Appelle Diocese. The Anglican Church of Canada is presently considering a regrouping of its ecclesial structure and the future cathedral status of St Pauls and the diocesan status of the former District of Assiniboia as the Diocese of Qu'Appelle may well be in doubt as the church deliberates over its increasingly top-heavy structure. The Institute for stained glass in Canada has documented the stained glass at St Paul's Anglican Cathedral

The property was sold to the provincial Crown in the 1970s by way of finally obtaining fiscal self-reliance: the Anglican Diocese of Qu'Appelle was originally a mission field of the English Diocese of Lichfield and this was increasingly anomalous. For a time the Diocese leased back the property from the Crown; it has now been sold for commercial and residential redevelopment. According to the City of Regina’s 2006 official Regina Development Plan,

The specific planning considerations for this site [include]: To support the preservation of significant heritage buildings on the site where feasible, and to ensure they remain as viable as possible ... To ensure a new development that is sympathetic to the style of the heritage ... To provide landscaped open areas which are conducive to pedestrian use and enjoyment and that will provide focal points for vistas to significant aspects of the site, such as to specific heritage features ... To ensure that building height and massing surrounding the heritage buildings ... does not overpower the existing heritage buildings and that the heritage buildings maintain their prominence ... To ensure that new development allows for views into the site from Broad Street to significant heritage features, especially the tower of St. Chad’s ... [And] [t]o ensure that architectural styles and materials used in the construction of new building façades and roofs are complementary to the original buildings.

The Sunday services of Carmichael Presbyterian-cum-United, next to Regina General Hospital, were broadcast on the radio. Its clergy furniture went to the University of Regina and is used in Saskatchewan Centre of the Arts for annual graduation ceremonies.

== The warehouse district ==
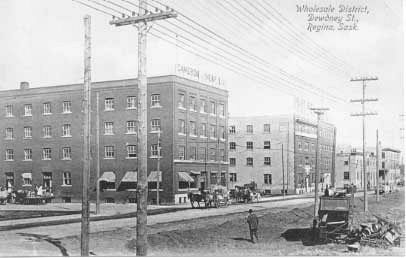
Warehouse district, Dewdney Avenue, circa 1915. Note horse-drawn drays

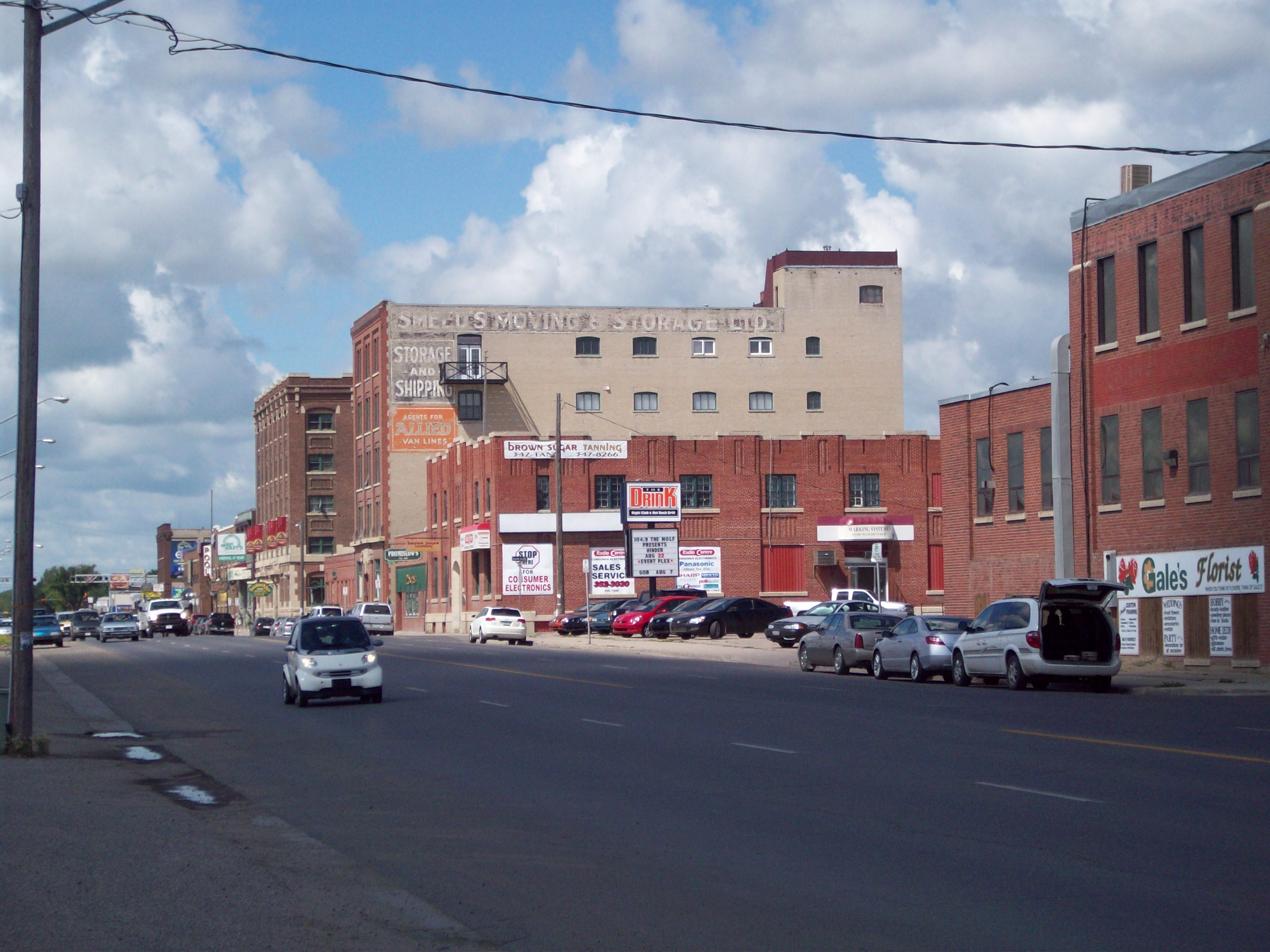
Warehouse District, Dewdney Avenue, 2008

Immediately to the north and east of the downtown central business district, beyond the CPR rail line, is the warehouse district. Before the highways were upgraded to the extent that they permitted trans-Canada commercial shipping by road within Canada, and did not require trucking companies to dip below the 49th parallel to traverse the Great Lakes, the railways knit the country together. In particular, the mail-order companies of Eaton's and Robert Simpson enabled inhabitants of now-defunct rural communities to shop by post.

Nowadays, as in other western Canadian cities, the old warehouses have long since outlived their utility as the railways have given way to the trucking on the highways as the preferred mode of commercial transport: in western Canada, as elsewhere, shipping by rail was supplanted by highway trucking once the Trans-Canada highway was extended from Ontario to the West and transport from eastern to western Canada no longer needed to dip into the United States below the Great Lakes. The old warehouses, however, have survived long enough that their destruction is not a foregone conclusion: they are, in Regina as in other North American cities, being turned into residential condominiums, tony restaurants and shopping precincts. However, at one time the warehouse district (together with the grain elevators adjacent to the CPR line) was Regina’s tenuous commercial raison d’être.

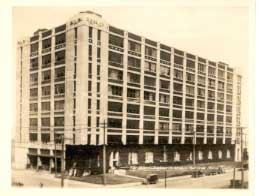
The Robert Thompson Co. Western Mail Order House, ca 1925

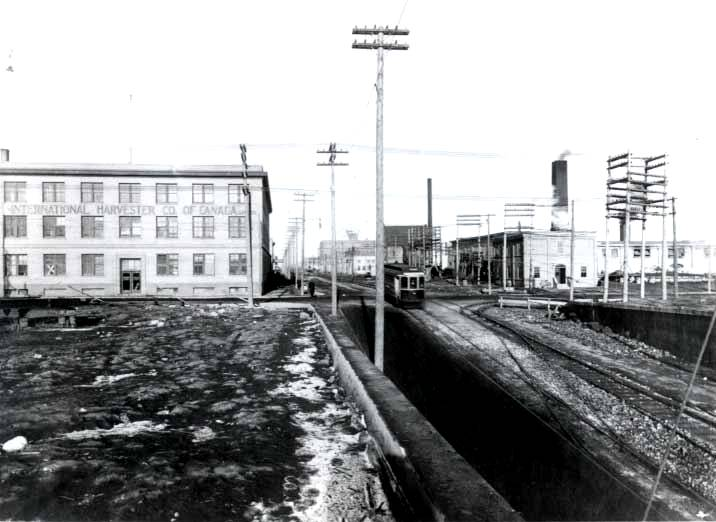
Intersection of Broad Street and Dewdney Avenue looking east in the warehouse district.

Somewhat to the north of the warehouse district, at 4th Avenue and Broad Street across the street from the cemetery, was and is the still-functioning Robert Thompson Co. Western Mail Order, "built in 1915. During the 1930s the Robert Simpson Company operated a full-service department store on the first four floors of the building. This continued until 1946, when Simpson's purchased the R.H. Williams and Sons Department Store on Hamilton Street and 11th Avenue and moved the retail end of the operation into that building. The Broad Street location became the wholesale wing of the Robert Simpson Company. Today, after many mergers, the company has become Sears Canada, and the Broad Street building is still in use ... as a call centre and warehouse."

It may seem a vast depletion of the downtown shopping area, it now having only one department store, the Hudson's Bay Company. But the fact is that for many years, until the arrival of the Hudson's Bay Company there were only two department stores downtown, Simpson's and the discount department store on Broad Street—the wholesale wing of Simpson's and Sherwood Department Store being outside city centre. Reaching a balance between convenience for residents of Regina and the desire to make the city appealing and impressive is not a novelty.

== Hospitals ==
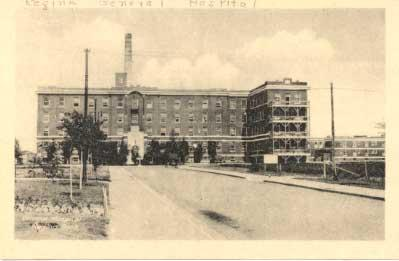
Regina General Hospital circa 1925.

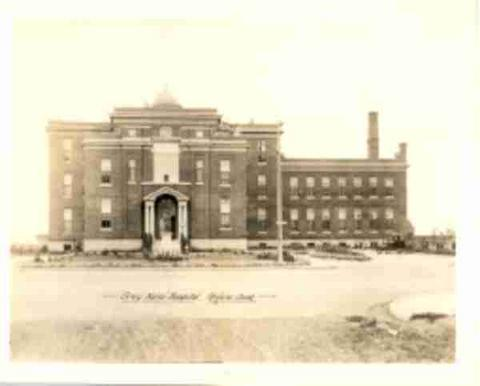
Grey Nuns Hospital circa 1925.

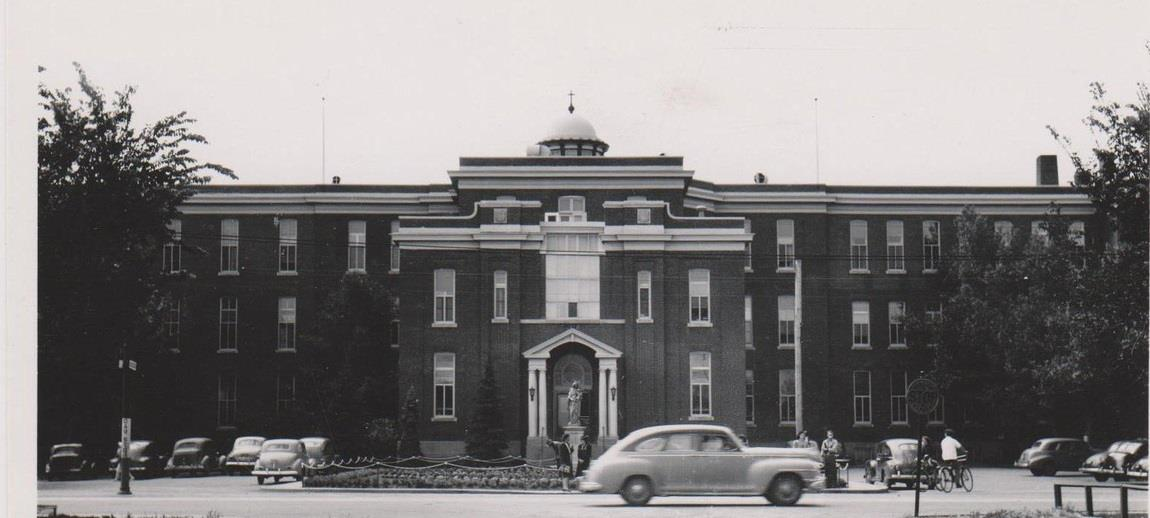
Grey Nuns Hospital circa 1948.

In its beginning, Regina had no hospitals and medical treatment was entirely by private doctors, both in their offices and by their paying home visits. Well into the 20th century the situation was rectified with the building of two which still use their original buildings, though both were considerably expanded, improved and modernised several times. Regina General Hospital is at the southern end of the East End at 14th Avenue and St. John Street, immediately east of Broad Street. (See map below in "Germantown and the west end.)

The Grey Nuns Hospital, now the publicly owned and operated Pasqua Hospital, is on Dewdney Avenue between King and Pasqua Streets, towards the Mountie Barracks.

(A third hospital, to the east of the Number 1 Highway bypass, was closed when it was discovered that building practises when it was erected included chemicals later found to pose a health threat. Construction repairs were made, but it did not reopen as a hospital but became the Wascana Centre branch of the Saskatchewan Institute of Applied Science and Technology: the second tertiary institute on the campus of or immediately adjacent to the University of Regina, after the Indian College became the First Nations University of Canada.)

== Downtown and West End ("Cathedral Area") churches ==
=== Parish and congregational churches ===
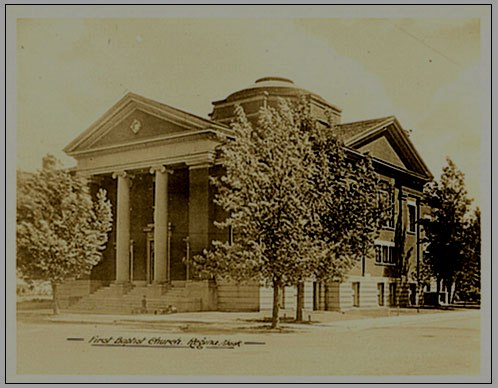
First Baptist Church, Regina, Saskatchewan, cnr 12th Avenue and Lorne Street

First Baptist Church on the corner of Victoria Avenue and Lorne Street, was opened in 1911 and its gold organ pipes first heard in 1912. The church was renowned for its large domed ceiling and chandelier. The Institute for stained glass in Canada has documented the stained glass at First Baptist Church. The 1912 Regina "Cyclone" severely damaged the church but it was soon restored. Unlike other imposing church buildings in downtown Regina and the East End, First Baptist survives as a major landmark.

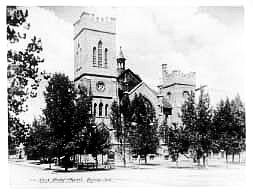
Knox Presbyterian (later United) Church, corner of 12th Avenue and Lorne Street

Knox-Metropolitan United Church is the current manifestation of Presbyterian and Methodist congregations that date back to 1885. "The original Knox Church was constructed in 1885 at Scarth Street and 11th Avenue. The Presbyterian congregation sold the site to the Dominion Government for their new post office and erected a new Knox Presbyterian Church at 12th Avenue and Lorne Street in 1905." Knox and Metropolitan churches were destroyed by the "Cyclone"; both were soon rebuilt. Knox Presbyterian, on 12th Avenue across from Victoria Park on the north side, was next door to the YMCA. Both were destroyed by the Regina Cyclone of 1912 and immediately rebuilt. In 1951 the two congregations of the now-United Church of Canada merged and occupied the Metropolitan building with Knox being demolished. Many of Knox's congregation had dissented from the 1925 church union, wishing to remain Presbyterian rather than become United Church, and adjourned to the new First (non-concurring or continuing) Presbyterian Church on Albert Street, built in 1926; more members of Knox's congregation had relocated to the new post-World War II residential subdivision of Lakeview, south of Wascana Creek and west of Albert Street, and when Knox United was demolished its impressive pipe organ was moved to Lakeview United Church. Knox-Met is the major venue for downtown choral concerts, organ recitals and the annual Kiwanis Carol Festival.

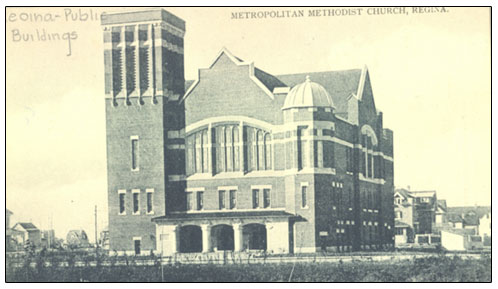
Metropolitan Methodist Church, like Knox Presbyterian, one block north and also on Victoria Park, destroyed by the Regina Cyclone of 1912 and immediately rebuilt

Like First Baptist and Westminster United, Knox-Met has its interior arranged in the Akron Plan, a square auditorium the pews arranged in a fan shape radiating out from the pulpit and portable communion table, making it ideal for such uses. The Darke Memorial Chimes are heard every Sunday morning and on other special occasions. The church has a large 3-manual Casavant Frères organ, the gift of Isabel Willoughby. Carmichael United Church in the East End, on the periphery of the central business district, was a congregation formed out of the previous Wesley Methodist and Carmichael Presbyterian churches in the immediate vicinity. Once one of Regina's most vibrant United Church congregations and the first church to have its services broadcast by radio, it closed its doors in June 1995 and the building was demolished in 1996. It had a substantial Casavant Frères organ and fine chancel furniture which has now been resumed by the originally Methodist and then United Church-affiliated University of Regina for use in convocation ceremonies.

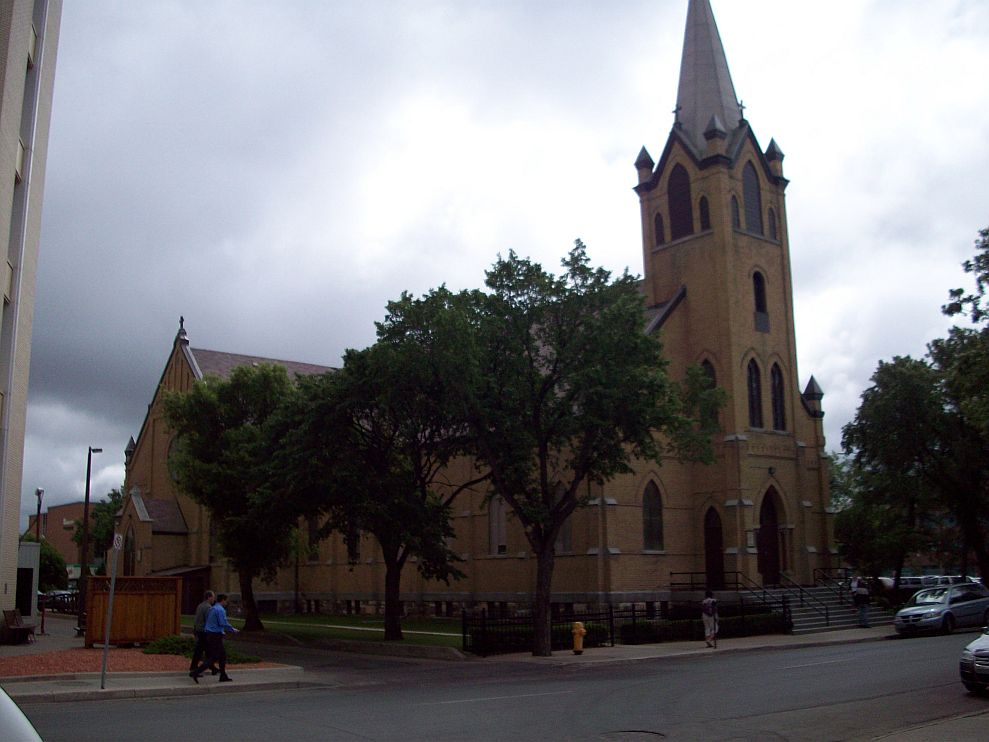
Blessed Sacrament Roman Catholic Church, Scarth Street

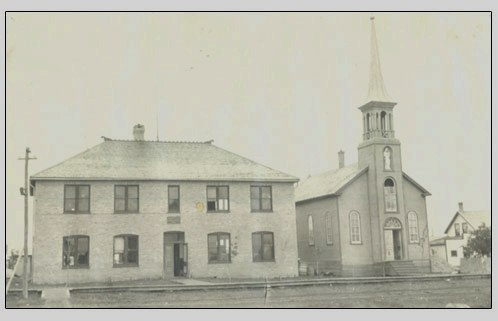
St. Mary's Catholic Church and School - Cornwall St.

Blessed Sacrament Roman Catholic Church at 2049 Scarth Street Scarth Street was built in 1905 as St Mary's, replacing an earlier Catholic parish church on a side street just north of Victoria park. It was renamed "Blessed Sacrament" in 1935 when the "Saint Mary" patronage was transferred to a new parish in Germantown. It replaced the original St Mary's Roman Catholic parish church to the north of what was then Victoria Square.

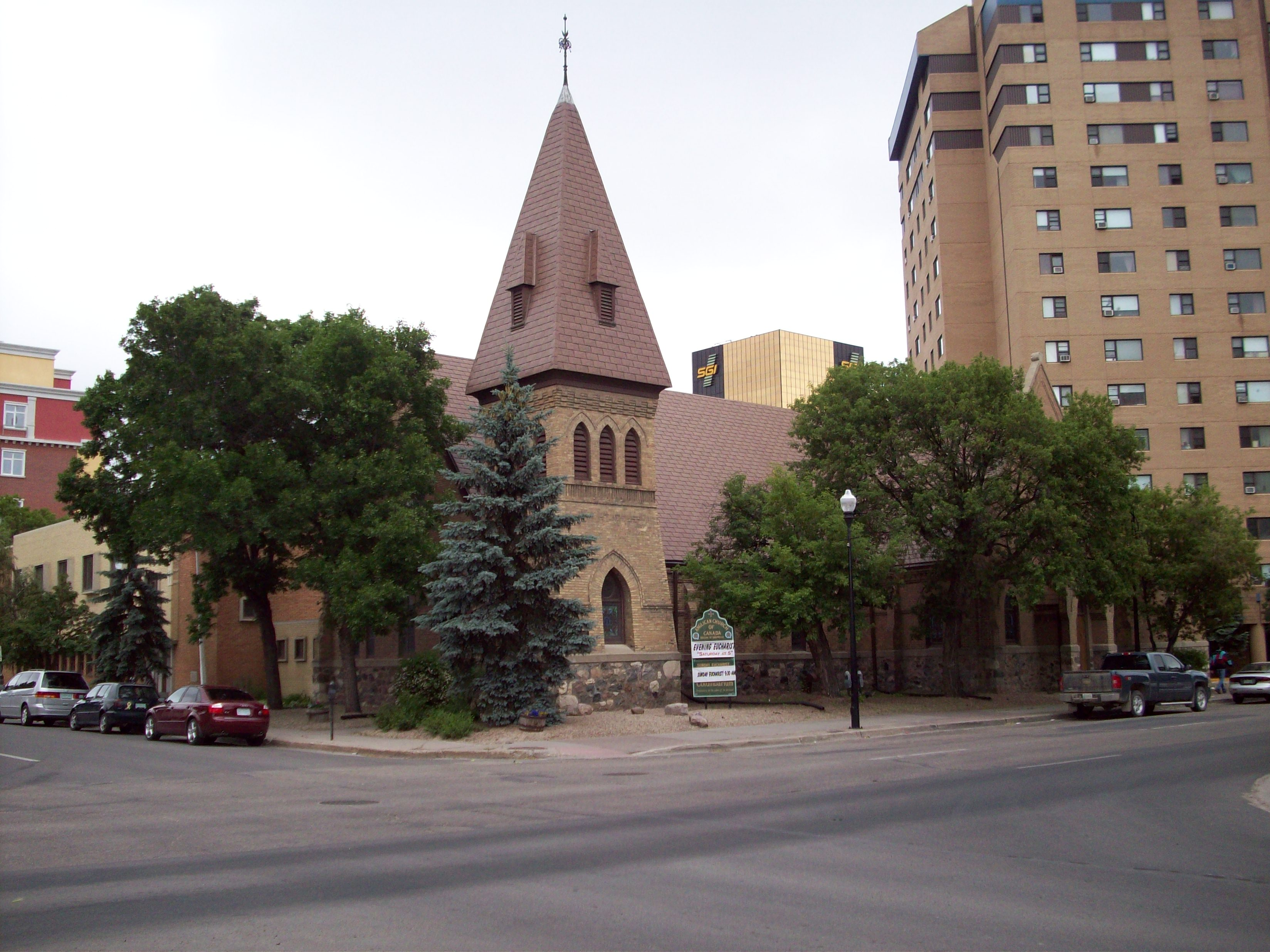
St Paul's Anglican Cathedral

St Paul's Anglican Cathedral, built in 1894 and the oldest church building in the city still in use, is a modest parish church on the periphery of the central business district whose parish dates from 1883. It has been the designated cathedral church of the Anglican Diocese of Qu'Appelle, comprising most of Southern Saskatchewan, since 1944 when it supplanted the original pro-cathedral of St Peter's in the eponymous town of Qu'Appelle. It was then assumed that St. Paul's would remain pro-cathedral temporarily and that plans would be fulfilled to build a substantial cathedral at the corner of College Avenue and Broad Street: the site remains obvious, with hedges planted about the planned building, its liturgical west end at the corner of the intersection. However, by 1974 the diocese reached the conclusion that this outcome was improbable, and St. Paul's Pro-Cathedral was designated Cathedral. Indeed, its organ console being on the liturgical and geographical south end of the choir, just inside the door into the chapel and the pipes on the north side, the choir was moved to the north transept with a new Casavant Frères organ, its two-manual console there and the pipes overhead. (The location of the organ console and the choir have changed a third time, now being in the north transept.) Its future cathedral status, however, is somewhat in doubt as the Anglican Church of Canada considers rationalising its increasingly top-heavy episcopal structure and, with decreasing numbers of active church people it being over equipped with that, with parish churches steadily decreasing in number.

First Presbyterian Church on Albert Street was built in 1926 by non-concurring dissidents from the various Presbyterian congregations in the city of Regina — notably from Knox Presbyterian-cum-United, led by Judge W.M. Martin, and from Westminster United—which had universally opted to enter the United Church of Canada in 1925. They built a fine, determinedly traditional church structure—with chancel, transepts and nave, as distinct from the Akron plan of Knox, Metropolitan, Westminster and First Baptist with pews fanning out from a central pulpit backed by choir benches—which is much prized by musical and cultural groups in the city as an auditorium. The Institute for stained glass in Canada has documented the stained glass at First Presbyterian Church.

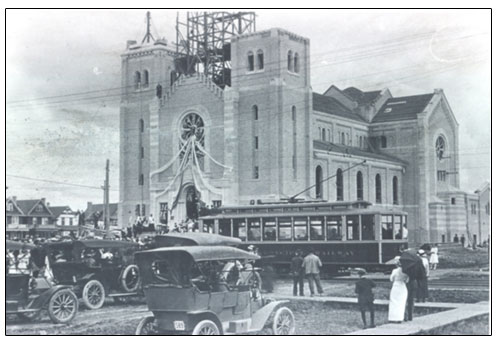
Blessing of Holy Rosary Cathedral, 1913

Holy Rosary Roman Catholic Cathedral, a grand neo-romanesque structure on 13th Avenue in the West End, was completed in 1912 and consecrated in 1913; at the time, its 235-foot twin spires were the tallest structures in Regina. Its Casavant Frères pipe organ, originally installed in 1930, repaired after a disastrous 1976 fire, and extensively refurbished and enlarged in 1992–1993, remains the largest organ in Regina. When it suffered its disastrous 1976 its congregation repaired next door to Westminster United, which gladly offered its worship space to Holy Rosary for the duration.

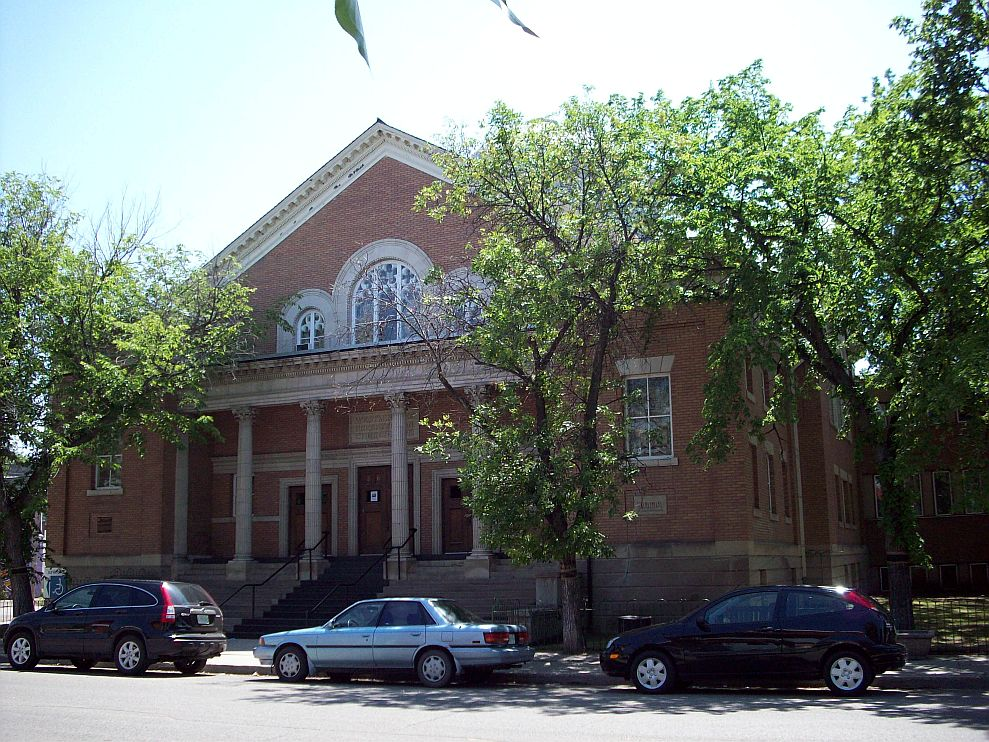
Westminster Presbyterian, later United, Church on 13th Avenue, immediately east of Holy Rosary Cathedral

Westminster Presbyterian, now United Church, immediately to the east of Holy Rosary on 13th Avenue, was also completed in 1913 and designed by architect Neil R. Darrach. Wascana Methodist, later United Church, a fine, elegant wooden structure in plain vernacular style on 13th Avenue at Pasqua, originally stood on 14th Avenue as Fourteenth Avenue Methodist Church, was moved in 1925 to its new site at 13th and Pasqua and later sold by its congregation when they built a new church in the West End; the congregation was subsequently dissolved and merged into Westminster. The West End, where the Cathedral is located, has acquired a somewhat bohemian air, and has in recent years increasingly attracted the sobriquet "the Cathedral Area."

=== The RCMP chapel ===
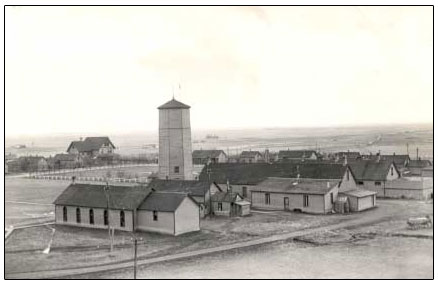
North West Mounted Police barracks, circa 1890, centring on building shortly thereafter converted to chapel.

The oldest remaining building in Regina is the RCMP chapel at the RCMP Academy, Depot Division, across the CPR tracks and to the west of the "Cathedral Area" on Dewdney Avenue, dating from the earliest establishment of the then- North-West Mounted Police as a guardhouse in 1885. It subsequently served as a mess hall and canteen and became a chapel in 1895. At the time Lieutenant-Governor Edgar Dewdney designated Regina as the Territorial Headquarters for the North-West Territories the CPR had not yet reached Pile of Bones: the now-RCMP chapel, constructed in Ontario, was accordingly moved by flat-car, steamer and ox-team to Regina.

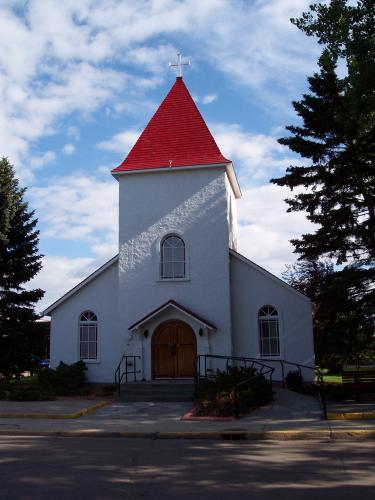
The RCMP Chapel

The Chapel, “[o]riginally built to house prisoners, ... served as mess hall and canteen until it was converted to a chapel in 1895. Construction began in Eastern Canada and the building was moved in sections by flat-car, steamer and ox team to Regina where it was assembled in 1885. The building was partially destroyed by fire in 1895 ... The first service was held in the new chapel on Dec. 6, 1895. A prominent addition to the structure, the spire, was designed and constructed by the staff of Depot Division in 1939.” The building was partially destroyed by fire in 1895. It was after its restoration that Mrs. Herchmer, the commissioner's wife, suggested the conversion to a chapel. The first service was held in the new chapel on Dec. 6, 1895. A prominent addition to the structure, the spire, was designed and constructed by the staff of Depot Division in 1939. The first two stained glass windows were installed in 1944 and two more in 1951.

The Mountie chapel is a favoured venue for RCMP weddings and funerals; most historic visitors to Regina have been taken to visit there. Among the postcards on sale at the Mountie museum are photos of King George VI and Queen Elizabeth at the chapel during their 1939 tour of Canada and the USA when they visited virtually every town and city along the CPR and CNR lines garnering enthusiasm for the imperial connection in anticipation of the inevitable World War II with Germany. The RCMP (then the NWMP) barracks was where Louis Riel was detained after his arrest in 1885 for leading the North-West Rebellion and hanged only four months later. The RCMP museum formerly contained a rather macabre display of the noose which hanged Riel though modern sensibilities have caused it to be retired from display.

== See also ==
- Heritage buildings in Edmonton
