= Between the Covers (radio program) =

Between the Covers was a program on the Radio One network of the Canadian Broadcasting Corporation. Formerly heard weekdays at 10:40 p.m. (11:10 p.m. in Newfoundland), following The Arts Tonight, the program no longer airs on Radio One's terrestrial network, although it is still in production as a weekly podcast and continues to air on CBC Radio's Sirius Satellite Radio channel.

The show's content is a series of ongoing book and poetry readings. The show is hosted by Lisa Christiansen, who is also a host at CBC Radio 3.
