= The Arts Tonight =

The Arts Tonight was a Canadian radio programme that aired weeknights from 10:00 to 10:40 p.m. on CBC Radio 2.

It debuted in 1988 with host Shelagh Rogers and covered theatre, dance, books, music and visual arts in Canada in a magazine and interview format. It was followed at 10:40 p.m. by Between the Covers. In 1993, it expanded for a time into a one-hour magazine show on Radio 2 followed by three hours of recorded concert performances of classical music; the concert portion was initially hosted by Paul Kennedy, and later by Peter Tiefenbach. This format lasted until 1996, when Tiefenbach moved to host a new daytime classical music show, Radio Concert Hall, while The Arts Tonight narrowed back down to a half-hour magazine format hosted on a rotating basis by Eleanor Wachtel, Erika Ritter and Carol Off.

In later years, the show was hosted solely by Wachtel.

The last episode aired on February 16, 2007.
