= Lisa Christiansen =

Canadian radio personality

Lisa Christiansen is a Canadian radio personality. She has hosted the programs Appetite for Distraction on CBC Radio 3 and Between the Covers on CBC Radio One. She left CBC Radio 3 on May 11, 2012, to pursue other roles with the CBC. She is currently the reporter/editor for The Early Edition.

With CBC Radio 3, she also hosted a number of podcasts in addition to her primary on-air shift, including Extended Play, in which she interviewed Canadian musicians about broader cultural topics related to music, and Full Metal Podcast, devoted to Canadian heavy metal music. She has also served on the nominating jury of the Polaris Music Prize.

On June 12, 2026, Lisa retired from CBC, and it was announced on Early Edition with Stephen Quinn, CBC Vancouver.
