= Erika Ritter =

Canadian playwright and humorist

- Born: April 26, 1948 (age 78); Regina, Saskatchewan, Canada
- Occupations: Playwright, humorist, journalist

Erika Ritter (born 26 April 1948) is a Canadian playwright, essayist, broadcaster and humorist.

Born in Regina, Saskatchewan, she attended Sacred Heart Academy for High School, and studied drama at McGill University and the University of Toronto.

A Visitor from Charleston was Ritter's first play to be professionally mounted; it was performed at the Manitoba Theatre Workshop in 1976. Ritter's most produced play is Automatic Pilot, which focuses on a self-deprecating female stand-up comic and her relationships with men. The play won the Floyd S. Chalmers Canadian Play Award in 1981. Automatic Pilot was also adapted for the radio in 1981, for which Ritter won Best Writer, Radio Drama at the ACTRA Awards. Two of Ritter's plays, The Passing Scene and Murder at McQueen, have been produced at Toronto's Tarragon Theatre.

In addition to her work as a playwright, Ritter has written and hosted programming for CBC Radio. Ritter was host of Saturday Stereo Theatre (1983–1984), Dayshift (1985–88), Air Craft (1988–1990) and Ontario Morning (2000–2005). She has also served as guest host on numerous programs, including As It Happens, The Sunday Edition, The Arts Tonight, Here and Now and Fresh Air, all on CBC Radio One.

Ritter has also served as a writer-in-residence at the University of Toronto, and the University of Prince Edward Island.

== Bibliography ==
Stage plays

- The Visitor from Charleston (1974)
- The Splits (1978)
- Winter 1671 (1979)
- Automatic Pilot (1980)
- The Passing Scene (1982)
- Murder at McQueen (1986)

Books

- Urban Scrawl (1984)
- Ritter in Residence (1987)
- The Hidden Life of Humans (1997)
- The Great Big Book of Guys (2004)
- The Dog by the Cradle, the Serpent Beneath: Some Paradoxes of Human-Animal Relationships (2009) ISBN 978-1-55470-076-9
