= History of Regina, Saskatchewan =

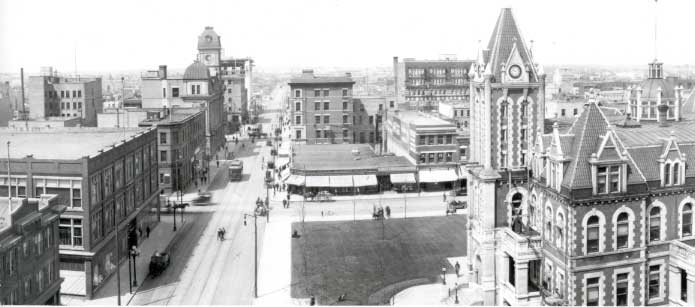
Skyline of Regina in 1912.

The history of Regina, Saskatchewan, the capital of the Canadian province of Saskatchewan. Prior to the province's establishment, Regina served as the territorial headquarters of the then-North-West Territories and district headquarters of the territorial district of Assiniboia.

== 19th century ==
=== Early settlement ===
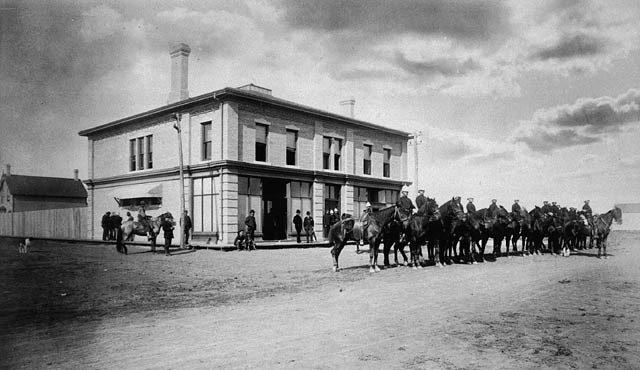
The Regina Court House during Louis Riel's trial. He was brought to Regina after his troops were defeated by government forces in the North-West Rebellion.

Regina was founded in 1882, when the Canadian Pacific Railway, then being built across western Canada, reached the site: by the time of the North-West Rebellion in 1885 the CPR had reached only Qu'Appelle (then called Troy), some 30 miles (48 km) to the east of what became Regina.

The Dominion Lands Act encouraged homesteaders to come to the area where they could purchase 160 acres (65 ha) of land for $10. The city was originally known as "Pile of Bones"—the English translation of the Cree place name "oskana kâ-asastêki" (lit. "Bones, which are piled")—because of the large amounts of buffalo bones on the banks of the Wascana Creek, a spring runoff channel rising some couple of kilometres to the east of Regina and gradually becoming a substantial coulee as it approaches the Qu'Appelle Valley some ten kilometres to the north.

In 1882, Princess Louise, Duchess of Argyll, wife of the Duke of Argyll, who was then the Governor General of Canada, named the new community Regina (Latin for queen), after her mother, the Queen. giving rise to frequent use of the sobriquet Queen City. Alternate names considered for the town were Leopold (for a son of Queen Victoria), Wascana (a mildly anglicized version of the Cree for "Pile of Bones") and Assiniboia (the Aboriginal people who gave their name to the district of the North-West Territories, corresponding to modern southern Saskatchewan, a famous mountain in the Canadian Rockies, a town southwest of Moose Jaw, and a river (Assiniboine) in Manitoba.)

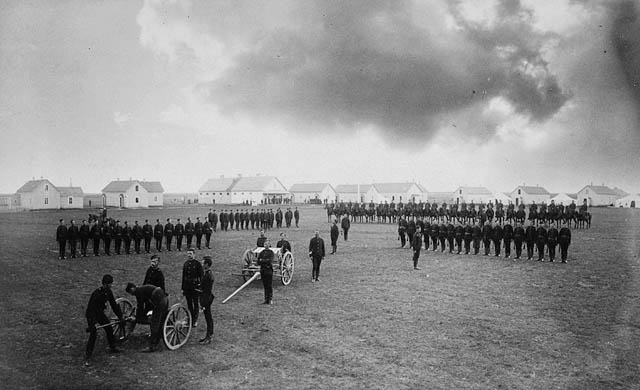
The North-West Mounted Police barracks in 1884. From 1892 to 1920, the headquarters for the North-West Mounted Police was in Regina.

Because of its location on the planned route of the new transcontinental railroad — the Territorial Lieutenant-Governor, Edgar Dewdney, had reserved substantial land on the site for himself — Regina was chosen in 1883 as the new capital of the North-West Territories, replacing Battleford, and over the in-many-ways-superior claims of Battleford, Qu'Appelle and Fort Qu'Appelle. The headquarters of the North-West Mounted Police was then transferred to Regina from Fort Qu'Appelle. In 1883, Regina was officially declared a town. The town's first mayor, David Scott, was elected on January 10, 1884. Regina remained the territorial capital until 1905 when Saskatchewan became a province.

Louis Riel was brought to Regina after his troops were defeated by government forces in the North-West Rebellion in the spring of 1885. Riel was found guilty of treason during trial and was hanged on November 16, 1885. One of three territorial government buildings remains on Dewdney Avenue where the trial was conducted. The trial was re-enacted each summer by local actors in the Trial of Louis Riel for many years. This play, based on the writings of author John Coulter, was not presented in 2004, but was revived for 2005.

The Royal Canadian Mounted Police training depot was established in 1874, and still survives. The RCMP chapel frame building was built in 1885 is still standing which was used to jail Indian prisoners. From 1892 to 1920, Regina was the headquarters of the North-West Mounted Police, and it is now headquarters of the Royal Canadian Mounted Police Northwest Region and home of the RCMP Academy, Depot Division.

== 20th century ==
Regina grew slowly for the first 20 years of its existence. With a population of more than 3,000, Regina was incorporated as a city on June 19, 1903, with Jacob W. Smith serving as the first mayor.

=== Establishment as the capital ===
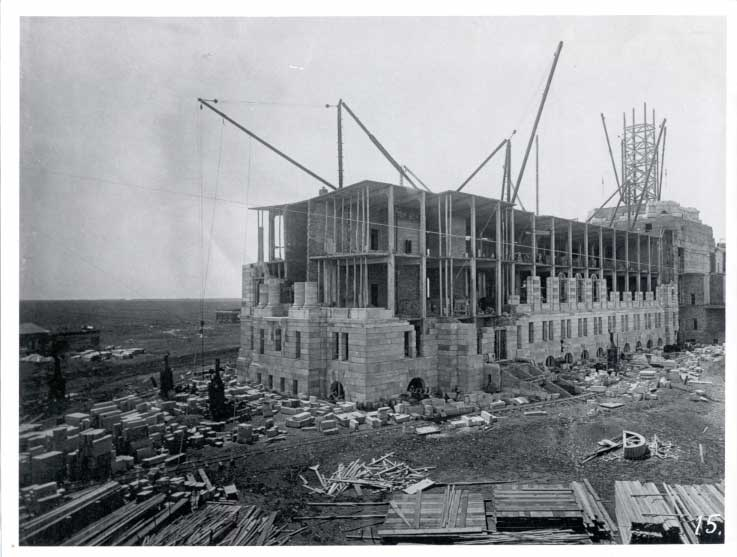
The Saskatchewan Legislative Building under construction in 1908. Work on the legislative building began three years after Regina was named the province's capital, in 1905.

After Saskatchewan became a province on September 1, 1905, Regina was officially decreed the capital on May 23, 1906. In 1908, the first city hall was completed in downtown Regina, while work began on the Saskatchewan Legislative Building across Wascana Lake. The years between 1903 and 1913 saw the city grow tenfold. Not only was the Government of Canada's immigration policy finally hitting its stride and attracting large numbers of settlers from the Austro-Hungarian Empire, from the British Isles, from eastern Canada and the U.S., but adjustments to railway tariffs made the city more attractive as a distribution centre for farm machinery and other supplies needed by the settlers.

The population growth set off a frenzied building boom that gave the city many handsome public and private buildings that are still standing. These include its two main hospitals, the Canada Life Building, Regina College (which became the University of Regina), Holy Rosary Cathedral (Regina, Saskatchewan), Knox-Metropolitan United Church,(although its predecessors, the then-Metropolitan Methodist Church and Knox Presbyterian Church, were destroyed during a tornado and rebuilt) and the provincial Legislative Building.

An important element in the economic development of the young city was the creation of the Warehouse District on the north side of the city's downtown Canadian Pacific Railway yards. Laced by railway spur lines and encouraged by a change in CPR freight rates that made it more attractive to ship manufactured goods westward from eastern Canada, the district led the city's rapid expansion in this period. Regina was chosen to host the Dominion Exposition of 1911.

On June 30, 1912, a tornado, locally referred to as the "Regina Cyclone," devastated the city, killing 28, injuring hundreds and destroying more than 400 buildings. The estimated $5 million in damage took more than two years to repair. Future horror film star Boris Karloff, who was in Regina at the time with a theatre company, served as a rescue worker after the disaster. The Regina Cyclone remains the deadliest tornado event in Canadian history. (Some sources state the tornado's toll was either 29 or 30.)

Growth tapered off with recession in 1913, and then the outbreak of the First World War, which saw immigration, capital and pools of workmen and building supplies dry up.

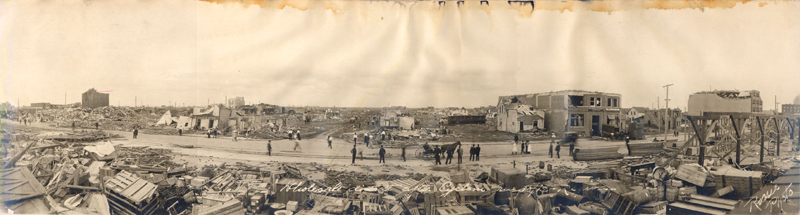
Regina's Warehouse District on 30 June 1912, shortly after the Regina Cyclone.

=== Roaring Twenties ===
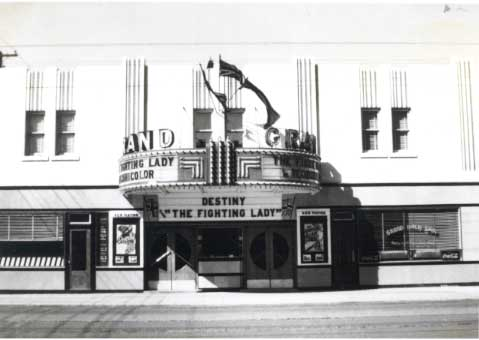
Regina Grand Theatre opened in 1912 as a stage and moving picture theatre. Unprecedented growth in the city's economy led to the development of several entertainment centres.

Well underway but drastically interrupted by the First World War from 1914 to 1918, the city had considerable prosperity though nothing like the enormous growth in population which was initially predicted. As with other cities, Regina had numerous entertainment centres, including cinemas housing both stage productions and moving pictures — six downtown cinemas at the peak of such period, the Regina Theatre at 12th Avenue and Hamilton Street opening in 1910 and the Regina Grand Theatre in 1912 on 11th Avenue between Lorne and Cornwall Streets — which survived until television developed in the 1950s and such businesses gradually closed until only one remained in the central business district in 2012.

The city was home of the first licensed airport in Canada (May, 1920) and was also the home of first licensed commercial pilot in Canada (First World War veteran Roland Groome), the first air maintenance engineer in Canada (Robert McCombie) and the first licensed aircraft in Canada (Canadian-built Curtis JN-4 (Can) G-CYAA).

Regina used STV-PR in its city elections from 1921 to 1926. When Regina used PR-STV in its second city election in 1922, Gordon Merllin, a local member of the Typographical Union, was elected.

Economic growth resumed postwar and switched into high gear in the late 1920s, in large part due to construction of the Regina General Motors auto assembly plant in the city's northeast industrial area in 1928–29. For a while, soaring wheat prices made Saskatchewan one of the richest places on Earth, in terms of per capita income. That led to a construction boom in Regina that left the city with an architecturally distinguished generation of apartment and commercial buildings.

The most ambitious such project, however, the Grand Trunk Railway's Chateau Qu'Appelle hotel at the corner of Albert Street and College Avenue (the site of the 1955 Museum of Natural History, now renamed the Royal Saskatchewan Museum), was abandoned, its building materials lying unused for years until they were eventually bought by the CPR and used in the construction of the Hotel Saskatchewan. The fiasco anticipated the later stalling of the intended Centennial auditorium, which sat only begun, derided as "the world's largest monkeybars" for years until it was finally opened in 1972 as the Saskatchewan Centre of the Arts.

(The oldest building in Regina still in use is the chapel at the RCMP's "Depot" Division, built in the early 1880s and later converted for religious use. Nearby Government House (Saskatchewan) was built in 1891–92 as an office and residence for the lieutenant-governor of the North-West Territories.)

=== Great Depression ===
The Great Depression of the 1930s caused massive unemployment in western Canada. In July 1933, a group of farmers, labour and social organizations met in Regina to form the Cooperative Commonwealth Federation or CCF, whose foundation document, the Regina Manifesto, was adopted at that first national CCF convention.

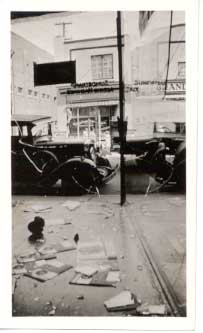
Damage from the Regina Riot in 1935. The riot was the culminating event of the On-to-Ottawa Trek, a protest regarding the conditions in federal relief camps.

As frustrations grew among the unemployed in 1935, 1,300 men boarded trains in Vancouver bound for Ottawa to demand work from the federal government in what came to be known as the On-to-Ottawa Trek. The issue came to a head in Regina, where the numbers had swelled to 1,800 by the time the Prime Minister intervened and ordered the protest to be disbanded. On the evening of July 1, 1935, a public meeting was called for in Market Square to bring the public up to date on what had happened so far. It was attended by 1500 to 2000 people, of whom only 300 were trekkers. The main body of the trekkers had decided to stay at the exhibition grounds.

Three large vans were parked on the sides of the square concealing RCMP riot squads. Regina police concealed themselves in a nearby garage. At 8 p.m. a whistle was blown and the police charged from their concealment, setting off hours of hand-to-hand fighting throughout the city's centre. The attack caught the people at the meeting by surprise, but then anger took over. They began to fight back with sticks, stones, and anything at hand. RCMP mounted on horseback then charged into the crowd and attacked with clubs. Driven from the Square, the battle continued in the surrounding streets for four hours. Trekkers on the speakers' platform were arrested by a body of police in plain clothes.

The police began firing their revolvers above and into groups of people. Tear gas bombs were thrown at any groups that gathered together. Plate glass windows in stores and offices were smashed. There was no looting, with one exception. People covered their faces with wet handkerchiefs to counter the effects of the tear gas and barricaded streets with cars. Finally the Trekkers who had attended the meeting made their way individually or in small groups back to the exhibition stadium where the main body of trekkers were quartered.

When it was over, 120 trekkers and citizens had been arrested. One plain clothes policeman had been killed. Hundreds of local citizens and Trekkers who had been wounded by police gunfire or otherwise injured were taken to hospitals or private homes. Those taken to hospital were also arrested. Property damage was considerable. The police claimed 39 injuries in addition to the one in plain clothes who had been killed.

The city's exhibition grounds were surrounded by constables armed with revolvers and machine guns. The next day a barbed wire stockade was erected around the area. The Trekkers in the stadium were denied any food or water. News of the police-inspired riot made the front page in newspapers across Canada. About midnight one of the Trek leaders telephoned Premier Gardiner who agreed to meet their delegation the next morning. The RCMP were livid when they heard of this. They took the men to the police station for interrogation but finally released them so they could see the premier.

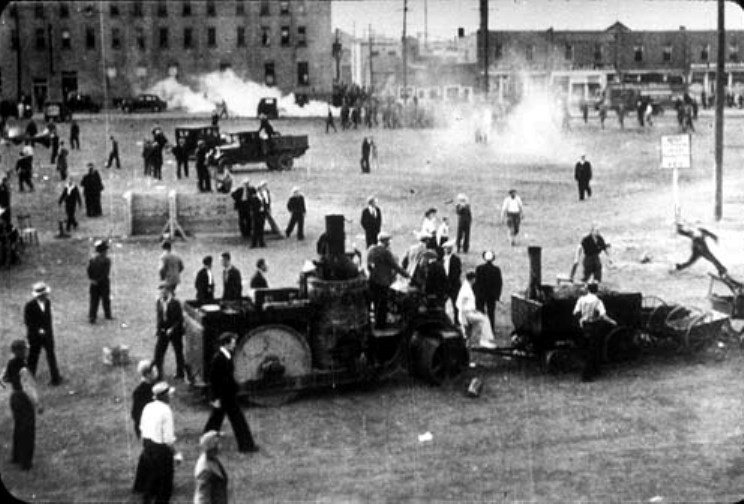
Scene during the Regina Riots. The machinery at the bottom of the frame is the city's tar-making machine, parts of which were used by rioters to throw at police during the riot.

Premier Gardiner sent a wire to Prime Minister Bennett accusing the police of "precipitating a riot" while he had been negotiating a settlement with the Trekkers. He also told the prime minister the "men should be fed where they are and sent back to camp and homes as they request" and stated his government was prepared to "undertake this work of disbanding the men." An agreement to this effect was subsequently negotiated. Bennett was satisfied that he had smashed the Trek and taught the citizens of Regina a lesson. Gardiner was happy that he was getting rid of the strikers from Regina and the province.

The federal minister of justice made the false statement in the House of Commons on July 2 that "shots were fired by the strikers and the fire was replied to with shots from the city police." During the long course of the trials that followed no evidence was ever produced by the Crown that strikers had ever fired any shots. Bennett further added to the misrepresentation by stating in the House of Commons the same day that the Trek was "not a mere uprising against law and order but a definite revolutionary effort on the part of a group of men to usurp authority and destroy government." Bennett's Conservative government was comprehensively defeated in the 1935 federal election; it has been speculated that the handling of the Regina Riot may have contributed to Bennett's discrediting.

=== World War II ===
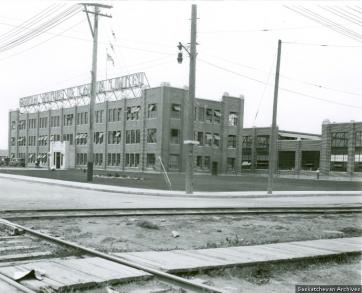
Although the Regina General Motors plant (pictured in 1928) was closed and left derelict in the Depression, it found new use and returned to vitality during World War II.

Regina like all Canadian cities contributed significantly to the Canadian war effort in both world wars both in manpower and capital. During the Second World War, young men from Regina volunteered for service, finding their way into all branches of the Canadian armed services. The Regina Rifle Regiment, one of the Allied units landing in Normandy on June 6, 1944, was raised in Saskatchewan. Its defence of Bretteville Farm on the night of June 7/8, 1944 has been credited by some historians with preventing a German armoured breakthrough that could have reached the vulnerable invasion beaches and caused havoc, delaying or even stopping the Allied advance into Normandy. The long-closed General Motors plant in Regina which had been derelict from the outset of the Great Depression in 1929 (and was never to return to private enterprise) was temporarily returned to vitality and employed many people for the duration of the war manufacturing essential materiel.

The Royal Canadian Navy corvette HMCS Regina, named for the city, sank an Italian submarine in the Mediterranean in 1943, but was itself torpedoed and sunk off the coast of Cornwall in August 1944.

Hundreds of Regina men flew for the Royal Canadian Air Force during the war. During the war, Regina was the home of three air force training facilities: No. 2 Initial Training School (which selected personnel for aircraft training; it was located in the province's Normal School or teachers college), plus No. 3 Air Observer School and No. 15 Elementary Flying Training School, the latter two at the Regina airport. The disused General Motors assembly plant (east on Dewdney Avenue), which had ceased operations as the Depression gripped the prairies, was requisitioned for armaments manufacture before returning to idleness at war's end.

At the conclusion of the war Regina's population was about 65,000.

=== Post World War II Regina ===
The early years of the province's social democratic government (first elected in 1944) brought into Regina a rich mix of civil servants ranging from a scion of Britain's Cadbury family to expatriate American intellectuals hounded out of their own country by anti-communist investigations. New York art critic Clement Greenberg noted of Regina in the 1950s: "The vitality of art in Regina does constitute an unusual phenomenon. It may involve, immediately, only a small group of artists, but five such fired-up artists would amount to a lot in New York, let alone a city of 125,000" (Saskatchewan Council for Archives and Archivists, 2001)

Postwar, the city adopted a de facto metropolitan form of government by annexing the independent village of North Regina, located around the Canadian National Railway yards in the city's northwest, and what was then called the "North Annex"—a motley collection of houses outside the city's northern limits along Broad Street, but within the Rural Municipality of Sherwood, which surrounds the city. In both cases, the prime motivating factor in amalgamation was the prospect of these districts getting connected to the city's water lines for drinking water and sewage. Financial aid from the provincial government eased this process.

After the war, Regina grew as a regional distribution centre for farming and rural activity. Not until the 1970s did the economy begin to shift from agri-base to industrial-based activity, although agriculture continues to dominate the economy of the city and province. In 1971, Jack Walker, a former RCAF bomber pilot, real estate developer and city alderman, took control of the industrial development of the city and began to diversify the local economy by encouraging light industrial business. In 1973 Deere & Co International selected Regina as the western distribution centre for all John Deere equipment. This vote of confidence in the young city combined with the expansion of the Consumers' Co-operative Refinery (the Co-op Refinery Complex, since 2012) and the development of the Inter-Provincial Steel Co. (Ipsco) plant began to lessen the city's dependence on agriculture-related employment. Today Regina's economy is quite diversified, with strong activity in the resource, financial and telecommunications sectors.

The city's centennial was marked in 1982, with Princess Anne, Princess Royal presiding over the celebrations.

== 21st century ==
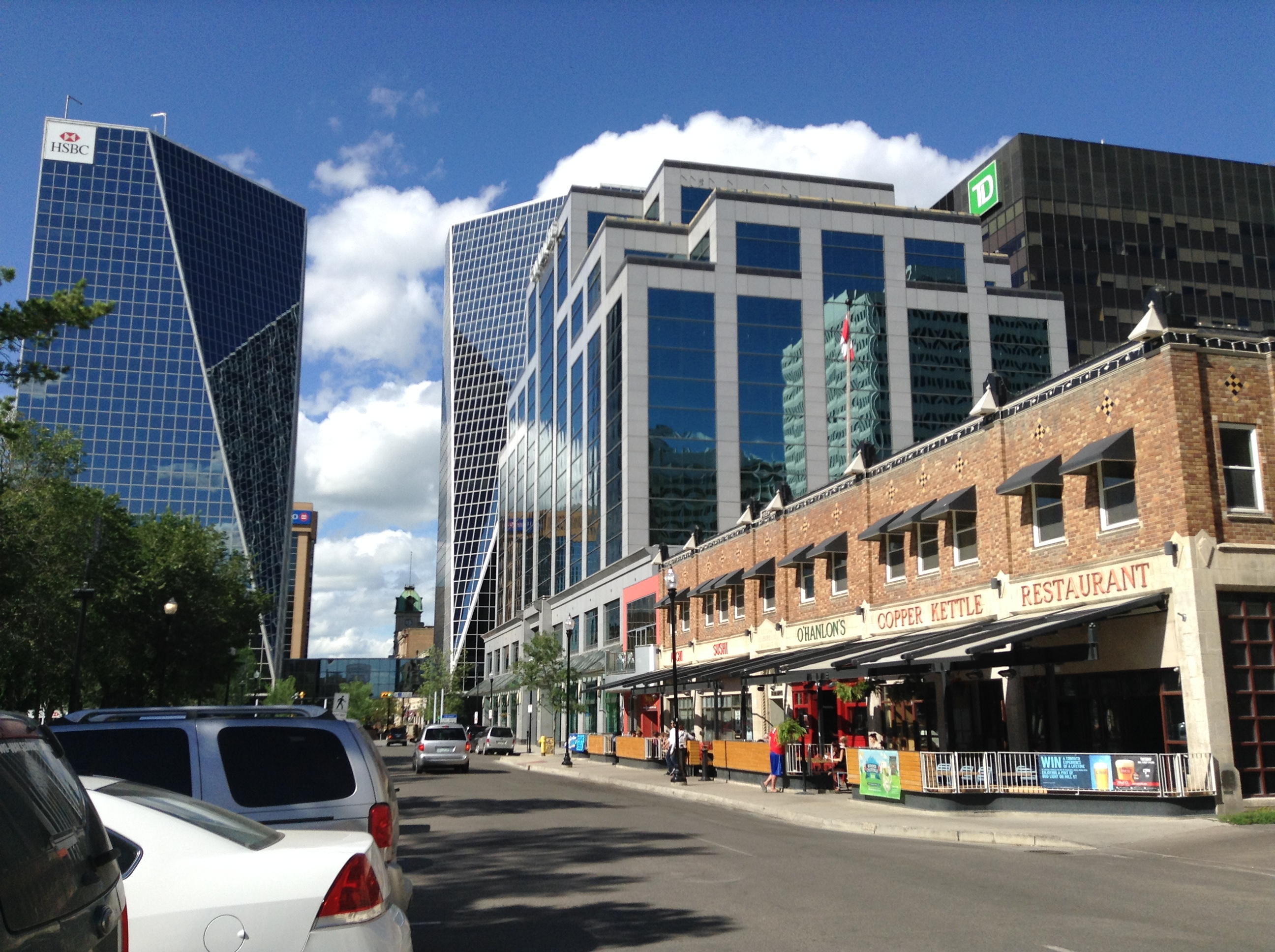
Skyline of Downtown Regina in 2016. The city has been working on revitalizing the economic viability of the downtown core in the past decade.

The RCMP Heritage Centre is a museum that opened in Regina in May 2007.

Regina's downtown core has experienced similar problems to those of other cities on the continent as the retail focus has moved to suburban shopping areas, especially "big box stores." The civic government has possibly not discouraged the depletion of Regina's downtown core, keeping parking expenses extremely high and repeatedly approving the development of further shopping complexes on the city perimeter. A limited number of condominium projects in the downtown have perhaps slowed the outflux of people living in the downtown area but continued issues of crime in the immediately adjacent North Central neighbourhood will continue to discourage urban renewal in the city centre. Some of the larger retail centres which have failed in recent years are being converted into government office space, which may return people to work downtown. IN recent decades Regina's downtown skyline has been somewhat altered with the construction of such buildings as the twin towers of the McCallum Hill buildings, Canada Life, and Agriculture Place. Casino Regina, built in the old Union Station, attracts visitors. Regina Downtown, the business improvement district for the area, reports that it is working to re-build the economic viability of the downtown core.

== See also ==
- History of Canada
- History of Saskatchewan
- Regina's historic buildings and precincts
- Timeline of Regina history
