= Timeline of Regina history =

The timeline of Regina history shows the significant events in the history of Regina, Saskatchewan, Canada.

== 19th century ==
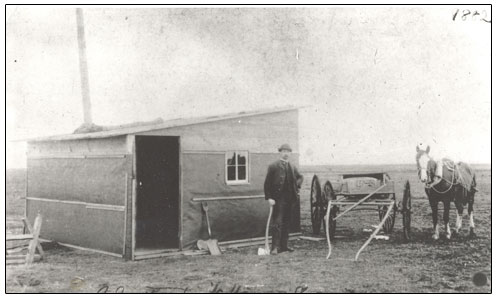
The first house in Regina (1882)

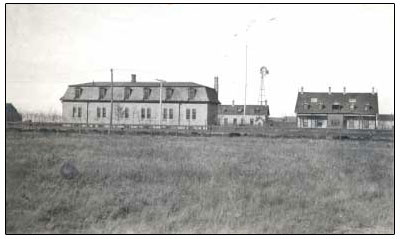
Territorial Administration Buildings, Dewdney Avenue, circa 1898

- 1872 – The federal Dominion Lands Act is passed to encourage homesteaders to come to the area, under the promise of 160 acres (647,000 m^{2}) of land for $10.
- 1882 – Regina was established.
- 1883 – Regina was chosen as the new capital of the North West Territories, replacing Battleford.
- 1883 – On December 1, Regina was officially declared a town.
- 1884 – The town's first mayor, David Scott, was elected on January 10.
- 1885 – Regina attained national prominence in 1885 during the North-West Rebellion when troops were mostly able to be transported by train on the Canadian Pacific Railway. By the time of the Riel Rebellion in 1885 the Canadian Pacific Railway had only reached Qu'Appelle (then called Troy), some 30 miles (48 km) to the east of what became Regina.
- 1885 – Louis Riel was brought to Regina after his troops were defeated by government forces in the North-West Rebellion in the spring.
- 1885 – The trial of Louis Riel. Riel was found guilty of treason and hanged on November 16.
- 1886 – On July 4, the first scheduled Canadian Pacific Railway transcontinental passenger train reached Vancouver, after travelling for five days, 19 hours. It was the first scheduled train to cross Canada from sea to sea.
- 1891 – Government House (Saskatchewan) completed.
- 1892-1920 – Regina was the headquarters of the North-West Mounted Police, and it is now headquarters of the Royal Canadian Mounted Police Northwest Region and home of the RCMP Academy, Depot Division.
- 1894 – The Supreme Court was built in 1894 on the northwest corner of Hamilton Street and Victoria Avenue.

== 20th century ==
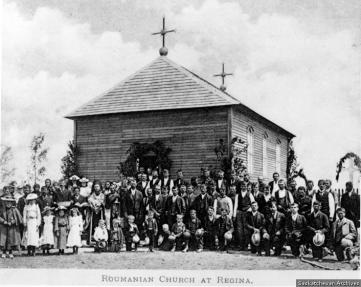
St Nicholas's Church built in 1902

- 1902 – St Nicholas's Romanian Orthodox Church established; it is the oldest Romanian Orthodox parish in North America.
- 1903 – With a population of more than 3,000, Regina was incorporated as a city on June 19, with Jacob W. Smith serving as the first mayor.
- 1906 – Regina was proclaimed the capital of the province of Saskatchewan on May 23 by the first provincial government, led by Premier Walter Scott.
- 1906 – Royal Saskatchewan Museum established.
- 1906-07 – The Old Post Office built. Its distinctive bell tower was added in 1912.
- 1908-12 – The monumental Saskatchewan Legislative Building was built.
- 1910 – University of Regina established.
- 1911 – The first site in Regina used for flying was the infield at Regina Exhibition Park's horse race track, where visiting barnstormer "Lucky Bob" St. Pierre flew a Curtiss Model D biplane in August.
- 1911-12 – Train Station- later to become Casino Regina was built.
- 1912 – On June 30, a tornado known as the Regina Cyclone hit the community, levelling much of the young city's business district, killing 28 people and injuring hundreds, making it Canada's deadliest tornado.
- 1913 – Regina Normal School built.
- 1914 – St George's Cathedral founded though the present building dates from the early 1960s), the episcopal seat of the Romanian Orthodox Bishop of Regina.
- 1929 – Regina grew rapidly till the Great Depression, when Saskatchewan was the third province of Canada in both population and economic indicators. Thereafter, Saskatchewan never recovered its early promise and Regina's growth slowed and at times reversed.
- 1930 – Albert Memorial Bridge (Regina, Saskatchewan) opened on November 10.
- 1933 – Regina Manifesto.
- 1935 – The adoption by the new CCF (now the NDP) of the Regina Manifesto, which set out the new party's goals.
- 1935 – The Regina Riot, an incident of the On-to-Ottawa Trek, on 1 July.
- 1944 – The 1944 election of the CCF under T.C. Douglas, the first social democratic government in North America and a pioneer of numerous social programs – notably of course Medicare – which were later adopted in other provinces and nationally.
- 1945 – At the conclusion of the war Regina's population was about 65,000.
- 1956 – The Prince Edward Building (Regina) was replaced as a post office.
- 1960 – The Romanian Orthodox cathedral built on Victoria Avenue in the East End.
- 1962 – The Saskatchewan Doctors' Strike, when medical doctors withheld their services in response to the introduction of Medicare with the enactment of the Medical Care Insurance Act, 1961 (Sask.)
- 1965 – The 1894 building was replaced in 1965 by the current courthouse on Victoria Avenue between Smith and McIntyre Streets. The Avord Tower now stands on the site of the Supreme Court building.
- 1966 – Globe Theatre, Regina founded.

== 21st century ==
- 2007 – The RCMP Heritage Centre opened.
- 2017 – The Mosaic Stadium opened.
- 2020 – COVID-19 pandemic in Saskatchewan.

== See too ==
- History of Regina, Saskatchewan
- List of years in Canada
