= Regina Summer Stage =

- Company type: Nonprofit
- Industry: Musical theatre
- Founded: 1984
- Headquarters: Regina, Saskatchewan, Canada
- Key people: Board of Directors: Lyndon Bray – President Chuck Jordan – Treasurer Carla Dorwart – Secretary Robert Huber – Webmaster Kenneth Ready – House Management Jean Taylor – Costuming Stacey Paus – Social Media Member-at-Large – Susan Holmes Member-at-Large – Ben Redant Member-at-Large – Alicia Dorwart Member-at-Large – Nathan Breitenbach
- Website: reginasummerstage.com

Regina Summer Stage is a Canadian community theatre organization established in 1984 and based in Regina, Saskatchewan, Canada.

== Background ==
Regina Summer Stage was formed by a group of citizens with an interest in community and musical theatre who wished to provide quality amateur theatre in Regina during the summer months. Encouraged and supported by the City of Regina Arts Commission, the organization has staged at least one major production every year since 1985. The organization's inaugural production was a successful run of the Gilbert and Sullivan musical H.M.S. Pinafore. Since that first show, Regina Summer Stage has produced scores of events, including musicals, dramas, and dinner theatre. Regina Summer Stage currently stages its productions at the Regina Performing Arts Centre.

== Production history ==
- 1985: H.M.S. Pinafore
- 1986: Godspell
- 1986: All Our Yesterdays
- 1986: Beyond the Fringe
- 1986: Saskatoon Pie (Regina Summer Stage sponsored this Persephone Theatre production)
- 1987: Charley's Aunt
- 1987: The Mikado
- 1988: Arsenic and Old Lace
- 1988: Brigadoon
- 1989: Last of the Red Hot Lovers
- 1989: Harvey
- 1989: Fiddler on the Roof
- 1990: Beyond the Fringe II
- 1990: The Pirates of Penzance
- 1991: Never Too Late
- 1991: South Pacific
- 1992: Lie, Cheat and Genuflect
- 1992: The King and I
- 1993: Side by Side by Sondheim
- 1993: My Fair Lady
- 1994: Grandpa's Twin Sister (Regina Summer Stage sponsored this Milestone Players production)
- 1994: Wife Begins at Forty
- 1994: Lullaby of Broadway
- 1994: Oklahoma!
- 1995: Key for Two
- 1995: Revue-ing the Situation
- 1995: Oliver!
- 1996: A Funny Thing Happened on the Way to the Forum
- 1997: Annie
- 1998: The Music Man
- 1999: Anne of Green Gables
- 2000: One Plus One (The Little Sweep, and How He Lied to Her Husband)
- 2000: The Sound of Music
- 2001: HMS Pinafore
- 2002: Anything Goes
- 2003: Brigadoon
- 2004: Camelot
- 2005: The Wizard of Oz
- 2006: An Evening of M and M's
- 2006: Anne of Green Gables
- 2007: Revue-ing the Situation II
- 2007: Oliver!
- 2008: Beauty and the Beast
- 2008: Past to Present—25 Years of Regina Summer Stage
- 2009: Grease
- 2009: Never Say Never (fundraiser revue)
- 2010: My Fair Lady
- 2011: Little Shop of Horrors
- 2012: Swept Off Our Feet: Boris Karloff and the Regina Cyclone
- 2013: Nunsense II, The Second Coming; Smokey Joe's Café
- 2014: Into the Woods
- 2015: Once Upon a Mattress
- 2016: The Producers
- 2017: Footloose
- 2018: Chicago
- 2019: Hairspray
