= Knox-Metropolitan United Church (Regina, Saskatchewan) =

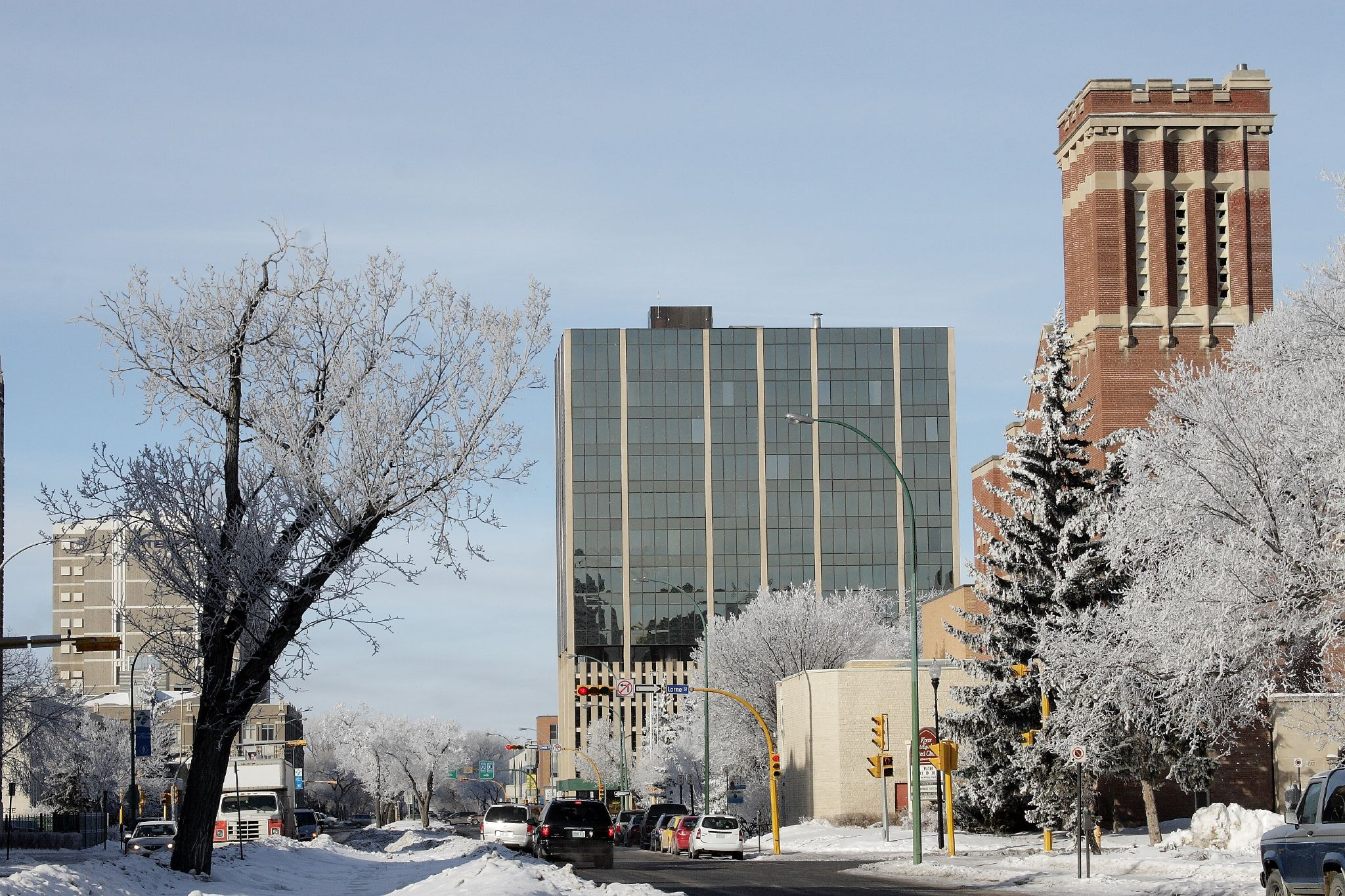
- Victoria Avenue with Knox-Metropolitan United Church right
- Knox-Metropolitan United Church
- 50.4475°N 104.6143°W
- Location: 2340 Victoria Avenue; Regina, Saskatchewan; S4P 2M1
- Denomination: United Church of Canada
- Website: knoxmetregina.org

Architecture
- Functional status: Active
- Architect(s): Darling and Pearson
- Groundbreaking: 1906
- Completed: 1907; 1914
- Construction cost: $100,000 first building

Knox-Metropolitan United Church stands on Lorne Street at Victoria Avenue across from Victoria Park in downtown Regina, Saskatchewan, Canada. It is the current manifestation of Presbyterian and Methodist congregations that date back to "worship services in both traditions…in 1882."

== Construction of Knox Presbyterian and Metropolitan Methodist Churches ==
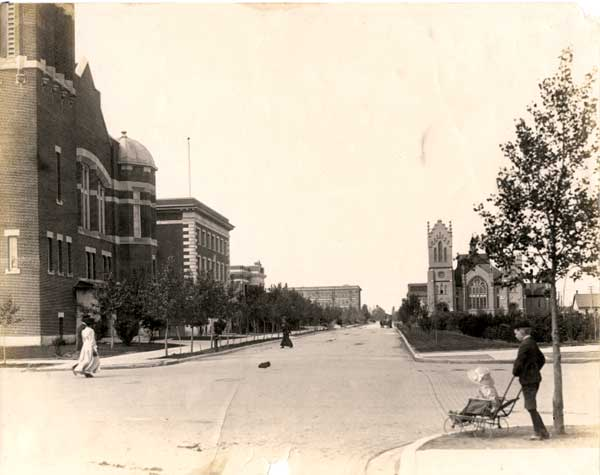
Metropolitan Methodist and Knox Presbyterian on Lorne Street, both facing Victoria Park, Regina 1911 before their destruction by the "Regina Cyclone" in 1912.

Knox Presbyterian originally stood at the corner of 11th Avenue and Scarth Street and was replaced by the Post Office building which was later temporarily converted to a substitute city hall and is now the Globe Theatre. The congregation of Knox Presbyterian relocated to the north-east corner of 12th Avenue and Lorne Street. "The Metropolitan Methodist Church was designed by Darling and Pearson of Toronto. It cost over $100,000 when it was built in 1906-1907.

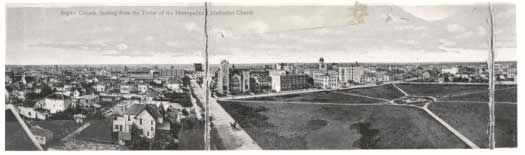
The City ca. 1913-1914 as seen from the top of the Metropolitan Methodist Church. Knox Presbyterian is in the centre of the photograph, across Victoria Park, still lacking trees or substantial vegetation.

Both were square rather than long and relatively narrow like Roman Catholic and Anglican churches, and both Knox's daughter congregation, St. Andrew's, and First Presbyterian on Albert Street, formed by a substantial and large minority of Knox's congregation who preferred not to be United Church.

== The 1912 "Cyclone" and re-construction of Metropolitan Methodist and Knox Presbyterian ==
Metropolitan Methodist stood on the site of Knox-Metropolitan United. "Francis Henry (Frank) Portnall was born on May 3, 1886, on the Isle of Wight, England. He began his architectural training at the age of 14 and then was hired as a draftsman with the London firm of Weir, Burrows and Weir. In 1906, he immigrated to Canada and worked on a farm in Manitoba. After harvest that year, Portnall was hired by the Toronto architectural firm, Darling and Pearson, and moved to Regina to supervise the construction of the Metropolitan Methodist Church, now the Knox-Metropolitan United Church."

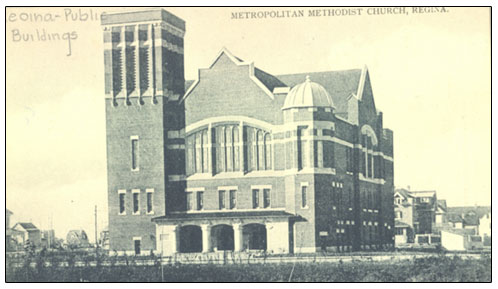
Like Knox Presbyterian, one block north and also on Victoria Park, destroyed by the Regina Cyclone of 1912 and immediately rebuilt.

Both Knox Presbyterian and Metropolitan Methodist’s buildings were destroyed by the Regina Cyclone of 1912. The congregational website in 2012 mentioned it, "We have a lot of history behind us at the corner of Victoria Avenue and Lorne Street in Regina. Our building was once knocked down by the tornado of 1912, but we got back up again." Both church buildings were soon rebuilt; "(ironically,...Portnall collaborated on a revised design when...Metropolitan Methodist was destroyed by a tornado...." before the economic demands of the First World War, which erupted in 1914 and which Canada immediately joined though the US remained neutral until 1916.

== Church union, 1925 ==
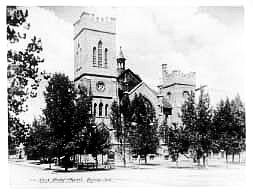
Knox Presbyterian (later United) Church, cnr 12th Avenue and Lorne Street in 1925

Both became United Church of Canada on June 10, 1925 when the new denomination was formed by the national merger of Presbyterian, Methodist and Congregational churches. Many of Knox's congregation had dissented from the 1925 church union and adjourned to the new First (non-concurring) Presbyterian Church on Albert Street, built in 1926.

In 1927 Mr. and Mrs. Francis Nicholson Darke donated the Darke Memorial Chimes to the Metropolitan Church in memory of their son, Clifford Albert Darke. The twelve hand-rung bells were cast in London, England by the firm that made the bells for Westminster Abbey, Mears and Stainbank of London, England, established in 1570. The peal consists of twelve bells, weighing nearly sixteen tons in all, tuned to the diatonic scale of C, having a span of an octave and a fifth. The largest bell, weighing about two tons, has two clappers since it serves as a toll bell as well. The bells, controlled by individually hung ropes, are arranged in the ringing chamber in a circular fashion where several ringers can work at one time or a single person can play a melody line.

== Merging of congregations ==
The congregations of the two churches, having become United Church of Canada in 1925, were merged in 1951 and the Knox building was demolished, the merged congregation thereafter generally referred to as Knox-Met and occupying the Metropolitan building. Many members of Knox's congregation had relocated to the new post-World War II residential subdivision of Lakeview south of Wascana Creek and when Knox United was demolished its impressive pipe organ was moved to the new Lakeview United Church. The only remaining visible Knox-Met "souvenir" of the cyclone of 1912 is different-coloured bricks on the north wall of then-Metropolitan, showing where the wall collapsed and was rebuilt. "The 'traditional' style of stained glass popularized by England’s William Morris continued well into the 20th century....There are fine windows in...Knox-Metropolitan United (in the Tiffany manner)...." The organ of Knox went to Wascana United Church south of Regina Avenue west of Wascana Lake.

== St. Andrew's Presbyterian-cum-United ==
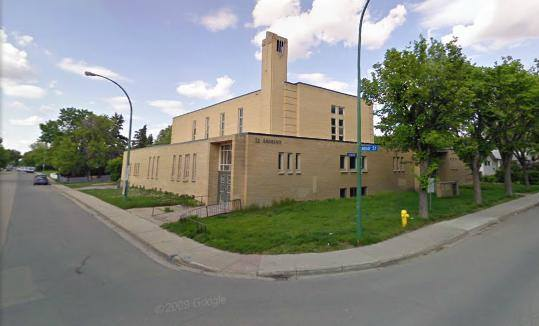
St. Andrew's Presbyterian-cum-United, now closed

St. Andrew's Presbyterian was long ago a daughter congregation of Knox Presbyterian. It was located north of the railway tracks at 1475 Athol Street and Dewdney Avenue, east of the North-West Territories legislative buildings; the congregation dated from before the founding of the Province of Saskatchewan in 1905. It was on Dewdney Avenue, east of Government House of the North-West Territories (before 1905). A new building was constructed after World War II; it only had an electric organ but its choir-director through the 1970s was Howard Leyton-Brown, the head of the music department at Regina Campus, later the University of Regina and ministers of St. Andrew's were highly eminent and visiting national leaders of the United Church would guest-preach there. Ethnicity of that area of Regina has changed in recent years and the congregation of St. Andrew's drastically fell but with its well-earned reputation for vitality and service, it relocated to Knox-Met rather than shutting down, and holds its Sunday services in the chapel.

St. Andrew’s Presbyterian congregation dedicated their first place of worship in November 1907…. Knox Church had its beginning in 1883 and by 1907 was concerned about the fifty Presbyterian families located north of the CPR. Consequently, St. Andrew’s Hall in the 2700 block Dewdney was built for a new congregation."

The second dedication…took place in December 1916 in the St. Andrew’s Church, Dewdney Avenue and Retallack Street….[I]n 1925…the congregation as a whole became St. Andrew’s United….A building fund was set up in 1927, but plans were interrupted by a depression and a world war…. St. Andrew’s had the distinction of having had only three ministers in its first forty years. Rev. F.H. Morgan began his ministry in October 1949 with the responsibility of piloting the building programme….with the rapid completion of the church in 1951 and the mortgage retirement in 1955….Under the guidance of Rev. G.L. Toombs (1956-61) buildings were extended in the building of the Christian Education Hall…. A new manse was built at Montague Street and 8th Avenue....Despite St. Andrews’ liveliness, substantial music and prosperity, a pipe organ was never built there, it remaining confined to a two-manual electric organ until the closure of its building.

Carmichael Presbyterian-cum-United Church in the east end was also a daughter congregation of Knox. Once a thriving church, its Sunday services were broadcast on radio. The east end significantly changed in character and Carmichael closed. Its clergy furniture wound up in the hands of the University of Regina, which uses it for degree ceremonies in the Saskatchewan Centre of the Arts.

== Knox-Met activity ==
Knox-Met is the major venue for downtown choral concerts, organ recitals and the annual Rotary Carol Festival. The Rotary Club began sponsorship of a Regina Festival of Christmas Carols ca 1940 at Knox-Metropolitan [sic] United Church. Such musical activity is accompanied by the three-manual Casavant Frères organ pipe organ that was installed in 1974.

Like First Baptist and Westminster United, Knox-Met has its interior arranged in the Akron Plan, a square auditorium the pews arranged in a fan shape radiating out from the pulpit and portable communion table, perhaps making it more suitable a focus in congregational worship than the formal style of Anglican and Roman Catholic churches with their principle altar on the liturgical east wall and the clergy and assistants facing away from the congregation for the communion ceremonies. In recent years of course the latter have moved their altars away from the liturgical east wall and closer to the congregation, faced by clergy throughout as was common in evangelical Protestant worship services. The Darke Memorial Chimes are heard every Sunday morning and on other special occasions. The church has a large 3-manual Casavant Frères organ, the gift of Isabel Willoughby and installed in the early 1970s.

== Gallery of "Cyclone" ==
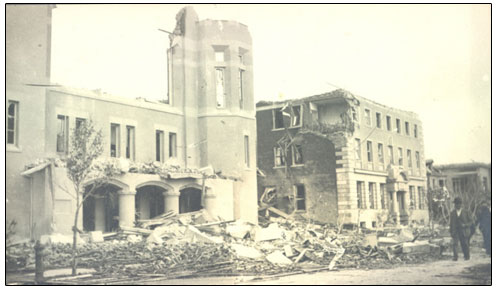
Metropolitan Methodist Church and YWCA after "cyclone"

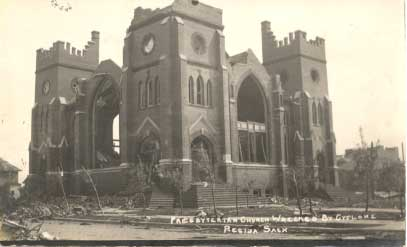
Knox Presbyterian Church after the "cyclone."

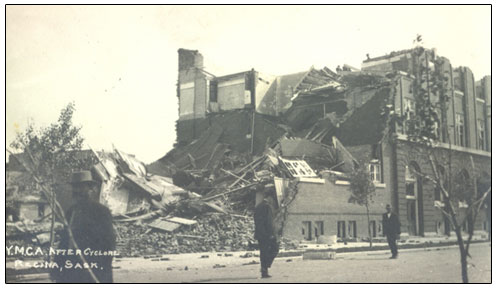
Damage to Knox Presbyterian Church and the YMCA

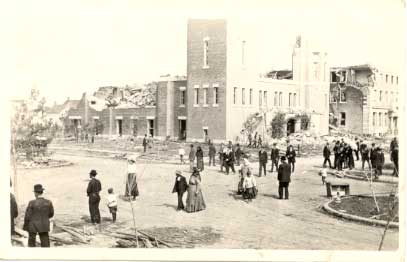
Metropolitan Methodist Church after the cyclone

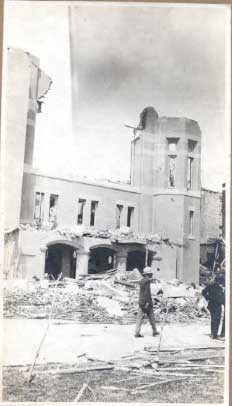
Damage to Metropolitan Methodist Church

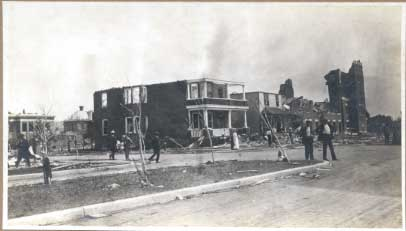
Victoria Avenue at Smith Street looking west to Metropolitan Methodist Church
