= Christopher Robinson (Canadian lawyer) =

Canadian lawyer (1828–1905)

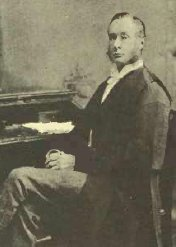
- Born: 21 January 1828; York (Toronto), Upper Canada
- Died: 31 October 1905 (aged 77); Toronto, Ontario
- Education: Trinity College
- Occupations: lawyer and editor
- Relatives: John Beverley Robinson, father

Christopher Robinson, QC (21 January 1828 – 31 October 1905) was a Canadian lawyer and prosecutor known for representing the Government of Canada in a number of high-profile cases and international disputes, including the trial of Métis rebel, Louis Riel.

Upon graduation from Upper Canada College, he obtained a BA from Trinity College and an MA from the same institution and was called to the bar in 1850. He was appointed a QC in 1863. He twice represented the crown prosecution when Patrick J. Whelan appealed his conviction for the murder of D'Arcy McGee and was the prosecuting attorney that prevailed in the trial of Louis Riel. In 1892, Robinson was appointed by Chief Justice Samuel Henry Strong as counsel for the province of Manitoba in a reference on the Manitoba Schools Question when the province's counsel refused to argue the case. In his later career, he represented crown interests in the Bering Sea Arbitration of 1893 and was selected by Prime Minister Wilfrid Laurier to represent the Canadian position in a dispute with the United States regarding the boundaries of Alaska.

Robinson declined a knighthood in 1894. He died in Toronto, Ontario on 31 October 1905.

Academic offices
Preceded by The Hon. George William Allan	Chancellor of the University of Trinity College; 1902–1905	Succeeded by John A. Worrell
