= Trial of Louis Riel =

1885 treason trial in Canada

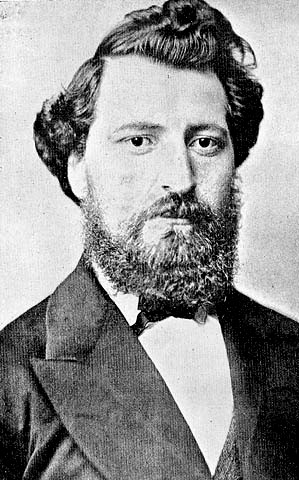
Riel at the time of his trial in 1885

The trial of Louis Riel took place in Regina, Canada, in 1885. Louis Riel had been a leader of a resistance movement by the Métis and First Nations people of western Canada against the Government of Canada in what is now the province of Saskatchewan. Known as the North-West Rebellion, this resistance was suppressed by the Canadian military, which led to Riel's surrender and trial for treason. The trial, which took place in July 1885 and lasted five days, resulted in a guilty verdict. He was also given a choice to plead guilty or insanity. Riel was subsequently executed by hanging, an outcome which has had a lasting negative impact on relations between Anglophone Canadians and the Riel supporters among French Canadians.

== North-West Rebellion ==
The North-West Rebellion occurred in the winter and spring of 1885. Louis Riel, a Métis from Red River in what is now Manitoba, had been one of the primary leaders of the Red River Rebellion in 1870. One of the divisive events of the Red River Rebellion had been the execution of Thomas Scott, who had opposed the provisional government which Riel had been instrumental in creating.

The Red River Rebellion had resulted in the creation of Manitoba, but the Métis of Manitoba had found themselves marginalised as Canadian settlers moved into the new province. Many of the Métis had moved to the North-West Territories, settling along the South Saskatchewan River.

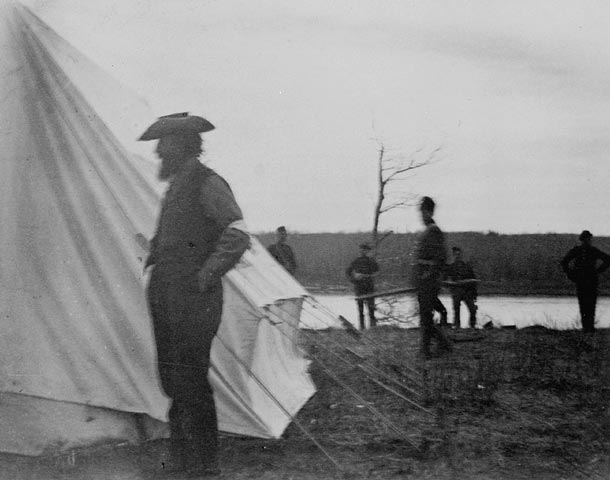
Riel kept prisoner at Batoche

As for Riel, he had been living in exile in Montana since 1875. In the spring of 1884, a delegation of four Métis, led by Gabriel Dumont, visited Riel in Montana and urged him to come to the North-West, to help the Métis, First Nations, and other settlers to express their grievances to the Canadian government. The grievances included the need for security of land titles, and the lack of democratic institutions in the Territories. Riel returned to Canada and became one of the acknowledged leaders of the Métis in the North-West Territories, as well as other groups in the North-West.

After the breakdown of initial parleys with representatives of the territorial and federal governments, the Métis and some First Nations took up arms, in March, 1885. The Canadian government sent troops west, which culminated in a battle at Batoche, where the Métis forces were defeated in mid-May. Following the defeat at Batoche, Riel surrendered himself to the government forces on May 15, 1885. He was taken to Regina, the capital of the North-West Territories, where he was imprisoned awaiting trial. He was manacled with a ball and chain.

== Trial ==
=== Charged with high treason ===
Riel was charged with six counts of high treason, by a sworn information laid before the stipendiary magistrate on July 6, 1885. The charges were laid under the English Treason Act 1351 which was in force in Canada prior to the enactment of the first Criminal Code in 1892. The Treason Act carried a mandatory penalty of death upon conviction. Riel was the only person involved in the Rebellion who was charged with high treason. Seventy-one individuals were charged with the lesser offence of treason-felony, while twelve were charged with murder.

=== Crown prosecutors and defence counsel ===
The team of Crown prosecutors had three accomplished senior lawyers from eastern Canada: George Burbidge, the Deputy Attorney General of Canada; Christopher Robinson, QC, who had represented the Government of Canada on a number of matters; and Britton Bath Osler, QC, who had already made a name for himself as a prosecutor. There were also two younger lawyers, who went on to distinguished careers: David Lynch Scott, the local Crown prosecutor for the district of Western Assiniboia, later appointed to the Supreme Court of the North-West Territories and eventually Chief Justice of Alberta; and Thomas Chase-Casgrain, who eventually became the Attorney General of Quebec. Chase-Casgrain was the lone French-Canadian in the prosecution.

Riel could not afford to hire defence lawyers. His defence was funded by supporters in Quebec, who established the Association Nationale pour la Défense des Prisonniers Métis. The defence was led by Charles Fitzpatrick, a notable lawyer from Quebec who subsequently became Chief Justice of Canada. He was joined in the defence by François-Xavier Lemieux, a member of the Legislative Assembly of Quebec and future chief justice of the Superior Court of Quebec; Thomas Cooke Johnstone, who acquired a reputation as a leading expert on criminal law and was eventually appointed to the Supreme Court of Saskatchewan; and James Naismith Greenshields, a lawyer from Quebec. Fitzpatrick, Lemieux and Greenshields went on to act as defence counsel for Honoré Mercier, the former premier of Quebec, and gained acquittals on corruption charges.

=== Defence objections to jurisdiction ===
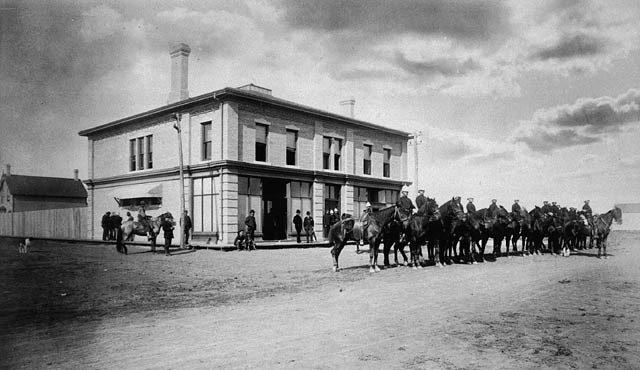
The land company building which served as the courthouse for the trial

The trial opened in Regina, July 20, 1885, before a court composed of stipendiary magistrate Hugh Richardson, assisted by Henry Le Jeune, a justice of the peace. Richardson was not a superior court judge, and the case was being tried on an information, rather than by way of indictment. As well, the jury was composed of only six men, rather than the traditional twelve jurors.

Riel's counsel immediately challenged the court's jurisdiction, arguing that the trial had to be held before a superior court judge, on indictment, and with a twelve man jury. Richardson dismissed all the motions, ruling that the court had jurisdiction. Riel then pleaded not guilty to all charges. Riel's lawyers argued for a delay for the defence to obtain witnesses. It was granted and the trial began on July 28, 1885, with jury selection.

=== Jury selection ===
Six man jury of Louis Riel's trial

Of the 36 people who had received jury duty summons, only one spoke French – and he was unable to attend. Moreover, the only Roman Catholic (an Irishman) in the jury pool was challenged by the prosecution for not being of British stock and excluded. Thus, despite the fact that French Canadian and Métis jurors could have been secured from among the population of the territories, Riel was tried by a jury of six composed entirely of English-speaking Protestants, all from the southern Assiniboia District.

The jurors were Francis Cosgrave from Whitewood, elected as foreman; Edwin J. Brooks of Indian Head; Henry J. Painter of Broadview; Walter Merryfield of Whitewood; Peel Deane of Broadview; Edwin Evatt of Moose Jaw.

=== Riel's mental state ===
One of the major issues at Riel's trial was his mental state. He had twice been committed to mental asylums in Quebec. During his leadership of the Rebellion, he had frequently mixed his political speeches with religious themes, including suggesting that the Métis were a special chosen people and that the Catholic Church should be replaced with a Church headed by a Canadian Pope. Some of his writings were said to show signs of megalomania.

The question of his mental state posed challenges for both the Crown and the defence. The common law recognised the concept of not guilty by reason of insanity, under the M'Naghten rules, which were based on the issue of whether an accused could not understand the consequences of his actions due to a mental health issue. The Crown would have to rebut any suggestion that Riel's mental state reached the threshold of the M'Naghten rules.

For the defence, the issue of his mental state divided Riel and his lawyers. His lawyers wanted to argue that Riel did meet the threshold of the M'Naghten rules, and thus was not guilty by reason of insanity. Riel objected to taking that defence, as he did not agree he suffered from mental health issues. His position was that his actions were justified and thus he was not guilty.

These conflicting views of the mental health issue, for the Crown, the defence, and Riel himself, coloured the entire trial.

=== Crown case ===
The Crown's case was that Riel had been the leader of the Rebellion, and thus had committed high treason. The Crown prosecutors downplayed the role of other individuals, such as Dumont, and called witnesses who emphasized Riel's role as a leader of the Métis. They also objected to attempts by the defence to lead evidence about the various grievances which people in the North-West had with the federal government. The prosecutors also called medical witnesses to rebut any suggestion that Riel was insane. The defence cross-examination of the medical witnesses called by the Crown attempted to prove Riel's mental instability and render a not guilty plea by reason of insanity. The defence made enough headway on this point that the Crown prosecutors recalled some of their witnesses to testify as to their personal encounters with Riel.

At the same time, the rift between Riel and his defence lawyers was apparent. He intervened whenever he could to proclaim his sanity, stating that it was the government which was "irresponsible". He also asked to cross-examine some the Crown witnesses himself, arguing that his defence counsel were not familiar with local circumstances and could not cross-examine effectively. His counsel refused to permit Riel to conduct the cross-examinations.

In all, the Crown called nine witnesses for the prosecution: General Frederick Middleton, the commander of the Canadian militia which had put down the Rebellion, Thomas McKay, George Ness, George Kerr, John W. Astley, Thomas E. Jackson, Dr. A. Jukes, Dr. John Henry Charles Willoughby, and Riel's cousin Charles Nolin.

=== Defence case ===
The defence had their turn on July 30. They produced five witnesses, Dr. François Roy of the Beauport Asylum; Dr. Daniel Clark of Toronto Lunatic Asylum; Riel's secretary for a short time, Philippe Garnot; and priests Alexis André and Vital Fourmond, all who gave evidence of Riel's insanity, but were far from sympathetic or supportive. Riel himself opposed the defence based on insanity. The defence's case lasted one day.

=== Closing arguments ===
Defence and Crown counsel then made their closing arguments. The speech of Fitzpatrick, lead defence counsel, has been described as "...perhaps the most passionately eloquent address ever heard in a Canadian courtroom." The first part of the speech outlined the historic role of the Métis in the North-West, and the problems they had faced with the federal government, highlighting the role of Riel as a leader in dealing with their grievances. The second part of the speech outlined the defence case for insanity, making a compelling case that Riel's conduct was not compatible with that of a sane man. The speech was thought to have had a significant influence on the jury.

The trial judge asked Riel if he wished to address the jury. Riel indicated that he did. Lemieux then stated to the judge that the defence counsel agreed that Riel had the right to address the jury, but that defence counsel "...must not be considered responsible for any declaration he may make."

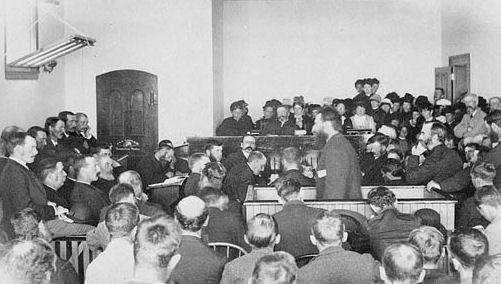
Riel speaks at his trial

Riel then delivered the first of two lengthy speeches, defending his own actions and affirming the rights of the Métis people. He rejected his lawyer's attempt to argue that he was not guilty by reason of insanity, asserting,

"Life, without the dignity of an intelligent being, is not worth having."

Riel defended his use of religious themes, but insisted that all his political actions were aimed at practical results. He denounced the Government of Canada for its complete lack of regard for the peoples and interests of the West. "Although the Province of Ontario is great", he said, "it is not as great as the North-West."

Nonetheless, Riel proclaimed that he hoped to be one day recognized as a force of good for the whole country. He said:

I am glad that the Crown have [sic] proved that I am the leader of the half-breeds [Métis] in the North-West. I will perhaps be one day acknowledged as more than a leader of the half-breeds, and if I am I will have the opportunity of being acknowledged as a leader of good in this great country.

One historian has commented on the effect of Riel's speech: "Riel ended his trial with an eloquent speech that systematically dismantled his lawyers’ insanity-defence strategy. This speech proved Riel’s sanity — it also all but assured that he would hang."

Robinson then gave the closing address for the Crown. It was brief and low-key. His main point was that the defence and Riel were offering two contradictory accounts: "My learned friends must make their choice between their defences. They cannot claim for their client what is called a niche in the temple of fame and at the same time assert that he is entitled to a place in a lunatic asylum." He also advanced the argument that Riel had played a leading role in the various communities of the North-West for eighteen months, during 1884 and 1885. Robinson asked how it could be possible that someone suffering from insanity could conceal it for so long, when playing such a role in public affairs.

The judge then summed up the case for the jury, outlining the facts and the law to be applied. He included a description of the M'Naghten rules and invited the jury to consider whether the test for insanity was met.

=== Verdict ===
On August 1, after an hour and twenty minutes of deliberation, the jury found him guilty of treason, but recommended mercy. The foreman was in tears. Nonetheless, Judge Richardson sentenced him to death, the only punishment available under the Treason Act.

Riel then made a second address to the jury. It was longer than the address of the previous day, and more secular in its approach. He expressed his satisfaction that he had not been found insane, and emphasised the concerns of the Métis. He outlined his proposals for the development of the North-West, if he were the Minister responsible, creating a multi-cultural society. The speech also demonstrated the rhetorical skills which had given him a leadership position with the Métis.

== Appeals ==
=== Legal appeals ===
The defence appealed the guilty verdict. The first appeal lay to the Court of Queen's Bench for Manitoba (at that time the appellate court for the North-West Territories), which denied the appeal. The defence then applied for leave to appeal to the Judicial Committee of the Privy Council in Britain (at that time the highest court of appeal for the British Empire). The Judicial Committee denied leave to appeal.

=== Political appeals ===
There were also numerous political appeals to the federal government for clemency. Prime Minister Macdonald was flooded with letters and petitions from sympathetic Québécois, who saw in Riel the French Catholic minority being oppressed by English Protestants. Macdonald refused to intervene to commute the sentence because of political pressure, and stated that Riel would hang "...though every dog in Quebec shall bark in his favour."

== Execution ==
The execution took place November 16, 1885, at what is now the RCMP training academy, near the modern-day RCMP Heritage Centre.

"We tried Riel for treason," one juror said fifty years later, "and he was hanged for the murder of Scott."

== Criticism ==
The outcome of the trial is said by some to be due to the underhanded conduct of the government and to the obvious rift between the lawyers and the accused. Throughout the trial Riel's lawyers ignored his advice and refused his requests (including the request to cross-examine the witnesses himself), and they threatened to abandon him halfway through the trial. Riel insisted that had the witnesses been properly cross-examined, it would have been established that his men had been attacked first: "Happily when they appeared and showed their teeth to devour I was ready: that is what is called my crime of high treason, and for which they hold me to-day."

In a paper written in 1975, "in an effort to discover how much weight attaches" to criticisms about the treason charges laid by the Crown against Riel, D.H. Brown starts by posing three questions: "i. Was the charge of treason properly applicable to Riel's crime? ii. Was it legal to lay such a charge against a United States' citizen? iii. Was the 1352 [A.D.] Statute of Treason the law in the North-West Territories at the time of Riel's trial?" He answers these questions by concluding that "at law it was a proper charge to lay against Riel", that Riel's U.S. citizenship did not matter since "he was a British subject till his death", and "he was legally chargeable as alien under the doctrine of local allegiance".

George Goulet asserts that there are lingering issues about the trial in terms of:

"- The 534 year-old English Statute under which Riel was convicted and executed.
- Riel’s mistreatment at the hands of his own counsel and the serious deficiencies exhibited by these same counsel [sic].
- Correspondence from Justice Minister Alexander Campbell to Prime Minister John A. Macdonald disclosing judicial and political meddling in the Riel trial of an improper nature.
- The manner in which the unanimous recommendation of the jury for mercy was handled by Prime Minister John A. Macdonald and rejected.
- The appointment of a medical commission to examine Riel prior to his execution and Macdonald’s blatant attempts of manipulation, deception, and mendacity within the commission’s reports."

In support of the unfairness of the trial, Salhany argues: "The fact that his speech from the dock was a disavowal of his insanity was probably the strongest evidence of his insanity."

== Legacy ==
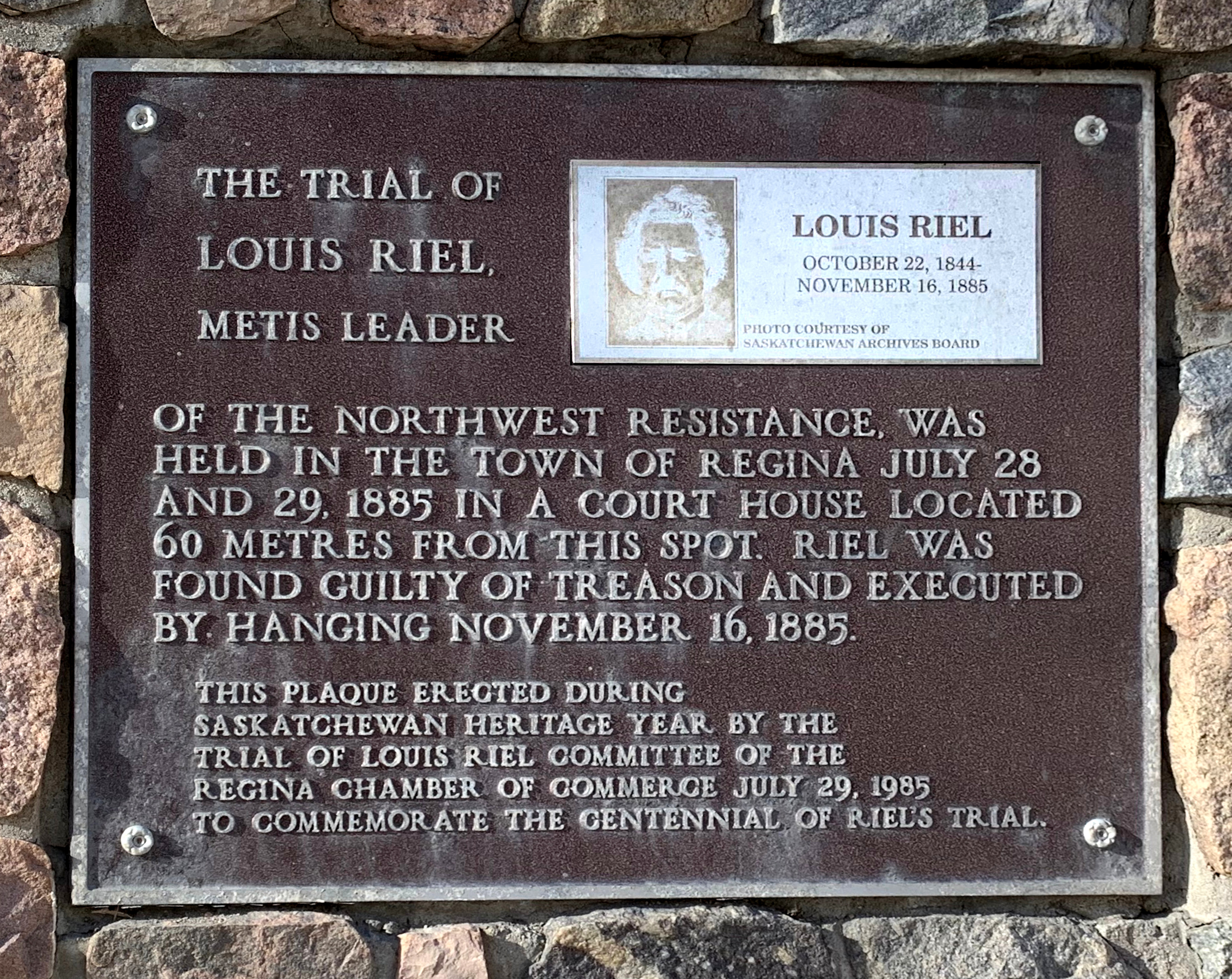
Commemorative plaque, close to the location of the trial

The Trial of Louis Riel is a play written by John Coulter in 1967 as a Canadian Centennial project. Commissioned by the Regina Chamber of Commerce and based on the trial transcripts, it has been played annually ever since in Regina in the summer, most recently in 2021, the 55th annual production and thus North America's longest-running historical dramatic production.

In the spring of 2008, Tourism, Parks, Culture and Sport Minister Christine Tell proclaimed in Duck Lake, that "the 125th commemoration, in 2010, of the 1885 Northwest Rebellion is an excellent opportunity to tell the story of the prairie Métis and First Nations peoples' struggle with Government forces and how it has shaped Canada today."

Perhaps most significantly, over 135 years after his trial, Riel is recognized as one of the most popular and written-about Canadian historical figures, "easily eclipsing" that of his nemesis, Prime Minister John A. Macdonald; also, Riel's trial "continues today with competing cultural stories and icons."
