= Lakeview, Regina =

Coordinates: 50.43143°N 104.62333°W

Lakeview
- Neighbourhood
- Interactive map of Lakeview
- Country: Canada
- Province: Saskatchewan
- City: Regina

Population (2011)
  - Total: 7,720
  - Average Income: $86,487

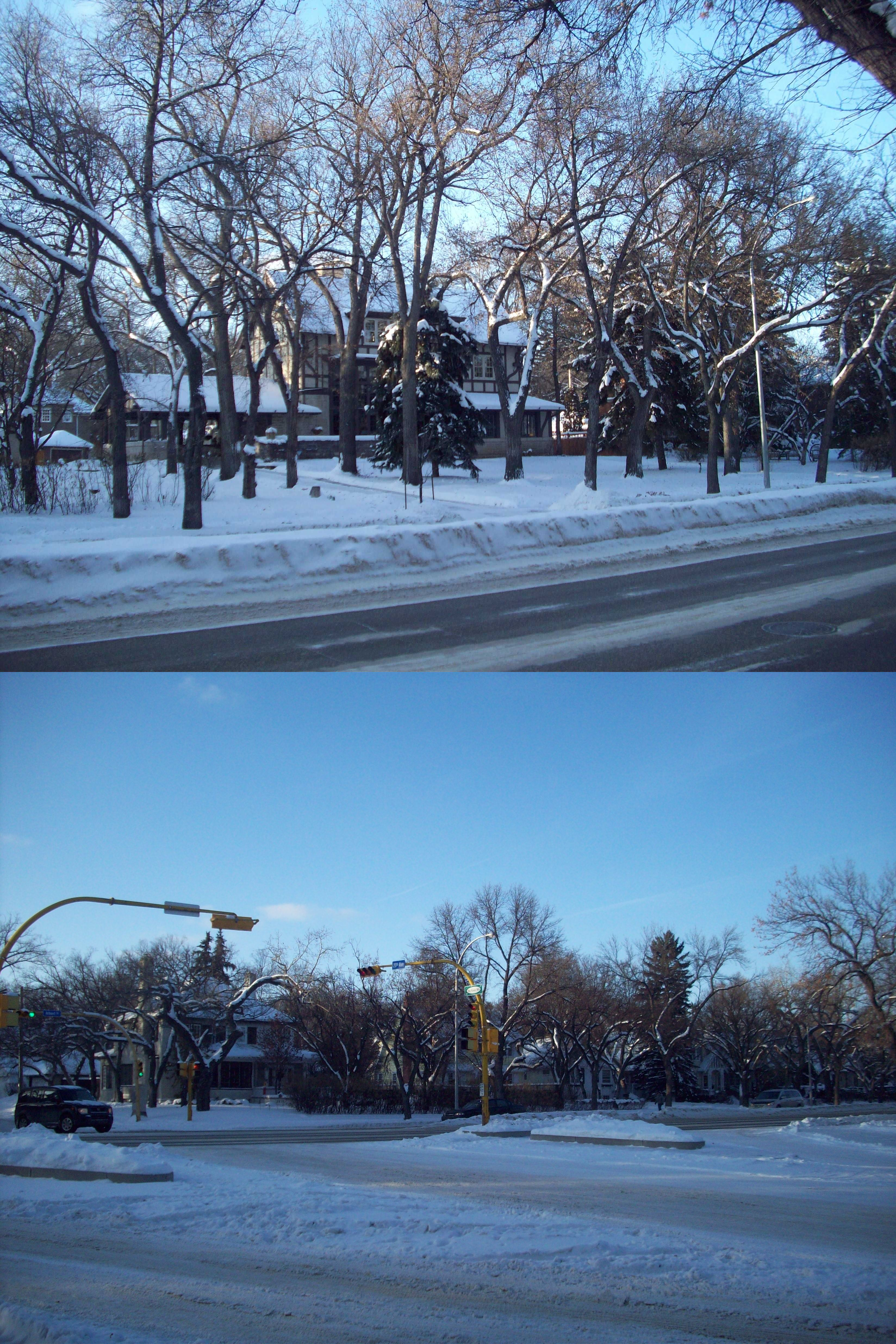
Mansions on South Albert Street

Lakeview Area ("Old Lakeview") is historically defined as the area bordered by Montague Street (west), Albert Street (east), 25th Avenue (south) and Regina Avenue (north) located in the south end of Regina, Saskatchewan. Over the years the borders have extended north to include residents beyond Regina Avenue and as far west as Lewvan drive, referred to as "New Lakeview."

The land where Lakeview resides was purchased in 1904 by McCallum Hill & Co. It was later annexed and subdivided by the City of Regina in 1911, becoming one of Regina's finest residential districts.

Lakeview School, 1941

One of the city's older neighbourhoods outside downtown and the West End, Lakeview features many pre-war and post-war character homes, its abundant canopy of matured elm trees, as well as a bevy of parks such as Les Sherman Park, Kiwanis Waterfall Park, Kinsmen Park and Lakeview Park. The proximity to the parklands of Wascana Centre, Wascana Creek and the Saskatchewan Legislative Building, makes Lakeview a desirable area in the heart of the city.

Lakeview is home to many heritage homes (Lakeview walking tour), the world's longest bridge (840') over the shortest span of water (50'): Albert Memorial Bridge, the oldest school in the city: Lakeview Elementary School (built in 1922; addition added in 1930), and the infamous Alport residence at 2876 Albert Street, the site of Colin Thatcher's 1984 murder.

According to the federal census in 2011, the neighbourhood's population is 7,720. Lakeview United Church holds the pipe organ which was in Knox United at the corner of Lorne Street and 11th Avenue until it was demolished in 1951.
