= Regina Plant =

Vehicle production facility in Regina, Canada

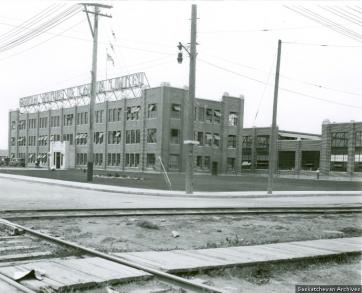
- The Regina Plant in 1928
- Location of the factory
- Built: June 1, 1928
- Operated: December 11, 1928 – 1941
- Location: Regina, Saskatchewan, Canada
- Coordinates: 50.457592°N 104.596352°W
- Industry: Automotive
- Products: Cars, trucks (later munitions)
- Employees: 1,000 (1928); 400 (1937); 1,596 (1943)
- Area: 29,845 m^{2} (321,250 sq ft)
- Address: 8th Avenue & Winnipeg Street
- Owners: General Motors Canada; (1928–1941); Government of Canada; (1941–1967); Government of Saskatchewan; (1967–1987); Government of Regina; (1987–present)
- Defunct: 1941; 85 years ago

The Regina Plant was an automotive manufacturing plant owned by General Motors Canada located in Regina, Saskatchewan. The 29,845 m^{2} (321,250 sq ft) facility began operation on December 11, 1928, six months after it was officially announced on June 1, 1928. Regina was selected because Saskatchewan was centrally located in Western Canada and was the third most populous province in Canada. The plant had 1,000 jobs. The building was decommissioned in 2020 and as of 2021, a study is planned to be conducted on whether to demolish the building.

== History ==
The Regina Plant was announced on June 1, 1928, and commenced operations six months after it was announced on December 11, 1928. The plant produced Chevrolets, Oldsmobiles, and Pontiacs. At the time, it was the largest manufacturing plant in Regina.

In October 1929, the Wall Street crash of 1929 occurred causing car sales to decrease sharply. The plant laid off some workers in early 1930. By August 1930, all production at the plant was stopped. In March 1931, the plant reopened, but production once again stopped a few months later.

In 1937, the plant reopened after General Motors spent CA$700,000 (almost half the original cost of the plant, CA$1,500,000) on renovations. The reopened plant had 400 jobs, under half then what it had when it originally opened. The plant also began producing Buicks and Maple Leaf trucks (modified Chevrolet trucks).

In 1941, due to World War II, plant was taking over by the Government of Canada, making GM no longer the owner, renamed Regina Industries Limited and was converted to the largest munitions plant in Saskatchewan, primarily focusing on gun carriages and anti-tank guns. In 1943, the plant employed 1,596 people. After the war, the plant was no longer used for vehicle manufacturing as production and distribution techniques changed, making it impractical for General Motors to operate the plant. The plant was used by the Department of National Defence until the mid-1960s. The building was acquired by the Government of Saskatchewan in 1967 and was used by various tenants. In 1987 the building was purchased by the City of Regina. It housed several City departments as well as private and public sector tenants.

On May 3, 2017, the Regina Plant caught fire, causing significant damage to the building. The surrounding areas was blocked off and power was cut to prevent further fire.

The plant is still standing and was used by several businesses for commercial purposes until 2020, when the building was decommissioned by the City of Regina. As of 2021, a study is planned to be conducted on whether to demolish the building, citing environmental concerns and asbestos in the building. The adjacent office building, the GMC Building, will not be demolished due to its heritage designation, and is still in use.

== Brands produced ==
- Buick
- Chevrolet (cars and trucks)
  - Chevrolet Maple Leaf
- Oldsmobile
- Pontiac

== See also ==
- List of former automotive manufacturing plants
