= Regina Cyclone =

1912 tornado in Saskatchewan, Canada

Coordinates: 50.4480°N 104.61461°W

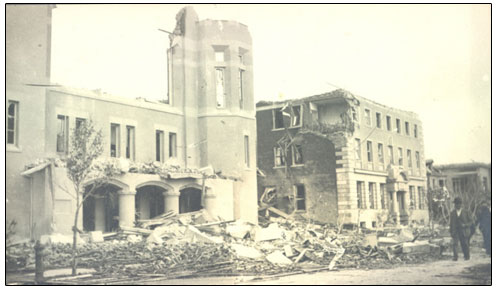
- Metropolitan Methodist Church and YWCA after the Regina Cyclone

Meteorological history
- Formed: June 30, 1912 4:50 p.m. CST (22:45 UTC)

F4 tornado
- on the Fujita scale
- Highest winds: 400 km/h (250 mph)

Overall effects
- Fatalities: 28
- Injuries: 300
- Damage: CA$4.5 million
- Areas affected: Regina, Saskatchewan

On Sunday, June 30, 1912, a violent and deadly tornado devastated the city of Regina, Saskatchewan, Canada. The tornado, also known as the Regina Cyclone or the Regina tornado of 1912, remains the deadliest tornado in Canadian history with a total of 28 fatalities and about 300 people injured. At about 4:50 p.m., green funnel clouds formed and touched down south of the city, tearing through the residential area between Wascana Lake and Victoria Avenue, and continuing through the downtown business district, rail yards, warehouse district, and northern residential area.

== Meteorological synopsis ==
The tornado formed 18 kilometres (11 mi) south of the city and continued for another 12 kilometres (7.5 mi) north of the city before dissipating. It was approximately 150 metres (490 ft) wide. The tornado's wind velocity has been estimated at 400 kilometres per hour (250 mph), making it the equivalent of a high-end F4 on the Fujita Scale. The tornado also displayed a multiple vortex structure throughout the city's residential areas, leaving individual houses untouched next to homes that were completely flattened.

== Tornado summary ==
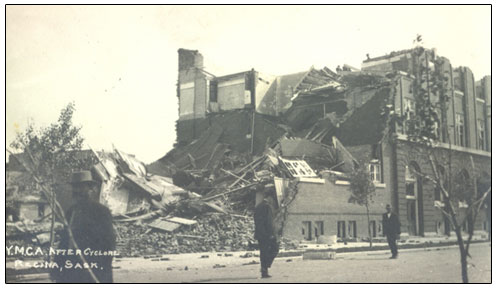
Damage to the YMCA on 12th Avenue immediately north of Victoria Park

The tornado hit Regina at approximately 5:00 p.m. on June 30, 1912. The tornado formed 18 km south of the city and was roughly 150 metres wide by the time it reached Regina. The worst damage was in the residential area north of Wascana Lake and the central business district. Many buildings, both brick and wood, were entirely destroyed. "The new Central Library building was opened May 11, 1912, and just six weeks later, the new library was among the many buildings that suffered damage."

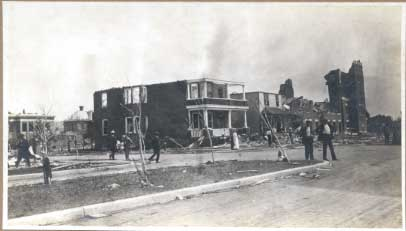
Victoria Avenue and Smith Street immediately west of Metropolitan Methodist Church, across Smith Street from the current City Hall

"In just twenty minutes it completely leveled a number of houses, and caused other houses to explode as the pressure inside the structures rose when the tornado passed overhead." The affluent residential area to the south was substantially diminished, but the tornado left houses untouched here and there immediately adjacent to houses which were flattened. "[I]n the warehouse district, it destroyed many of the storage buildings. The CPR Roundhouse was stripped to the rafters, and boxcars were pulled from the tracks and hurtled into the air."

Such damage was especially appalling to see as well as experience since Regina had been built on an entirely featureless plain, lacking any trees or vegetation other than natural wild prairie grass and without any hills or rivers apart from the tiny spring runoff Wascana Creek, which only flowed in early spring.

"The cyclone claimed twenty-eight lives and was the worst in Canadian history in terms of deaths. It also rendered 2,500 persons temporarily homeless, and caused over $1,200,000 in property damage. It took the city two years to repair the damage and ten years to pay off its storm debt."

== Aftermath ==
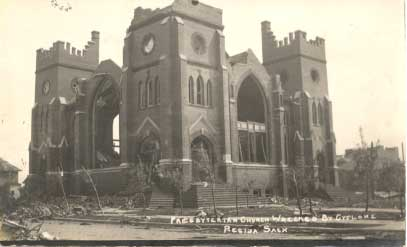
Knox Presbyterian church wrecked by cyclone, north side of 12th Avenue and Lorne Street, across from Victoria Park

The city forced those rendered homeless by the disaster to pay for the nightly use of cots set up in schools and city parks. It also required homeowners to pay for the removal of rubble from their homes. Debris was cleaned up rather quickly. "The storm damaged the Metropolitan Methodist Church, [the Knox Presbyterian Church, the First Methodist,] the library, the YWCA [and YMCA], and numerous other downtown buildings; in the warehouse district, it destroyed many of the storage buildings.

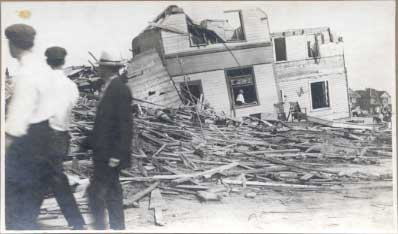
Regina houses damaged by the Regina Cyclone

Damage from the tornado is estimated to be F4 on the Fujita scale. The tornado killed 28 people, injured hundreds, and left 2,500 people homeless, out of a population of about 30,213 (in 1911). Around 500 buildings were destroyed or damaged. Property damage was quantified at $1.2 million CAD, and it would be forty years before the $4.5 million CAD private and public debt incurred to rebuild and repair was repaid.

The only remaining "souvenir" of this event is different-coloured bricks on the north wall of Regina's Knox-Metropolitan United Church (the former Metropolitan Methodist church). The bricks show where the wall was rebuilt after its tornado-caused collapse. Knox Presbyterian, Metropolitan Methodist and First Baptist, all being brick, were rebuilt after the tornado. Knox and Metropolitan both became United Church in 1925, and merged their congregations in 1951 to become the Knox-Metropolitan Church, meeting in the old Metropolitan Church. The Knox building was ultimately demolished.

== Popular culture ==
Boris Karloff, Jeanne Russell, Henrietta Crosman, and the Albini-Avolos are all characters in BD Miller's musical drama, "Swept Off Our Feet: Boris Karloff and the Regina Cyclone", which commemorated the 100th anniversary of the disaster and premiered as a July 2012 production of Regina Summer Stage. Karloff, several years before launching his film career, was in Regina at the time of the disaster performing with a travelling theatrical troupe and assisted in search and rescue efforts, an experience he would recount during a 1960s appearance on the CBC series Front Page Challenge.

The novel Euphoria by Connie Gault won the 2009 Saskatchewan Book Award for Fiction and prominently features the Regina Cyclone.

A chapter of Frank Rasky's book Great Canadian Disasters (1961) is devoted to this tragedy.

== See also ==
- List of Canadian tornadoes and tornado outbreaks (before 2001)

== Gallery ==
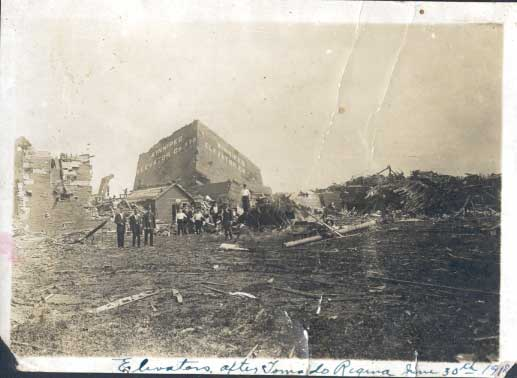
Winnipeg Elevator after the tornado

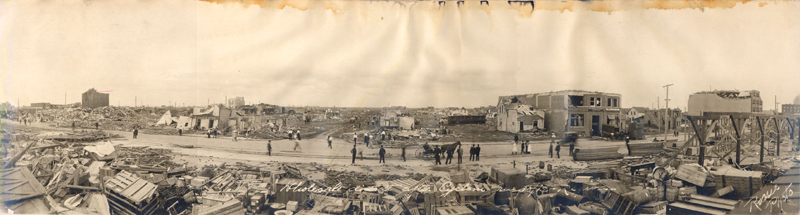
Warehouse district after the tornado

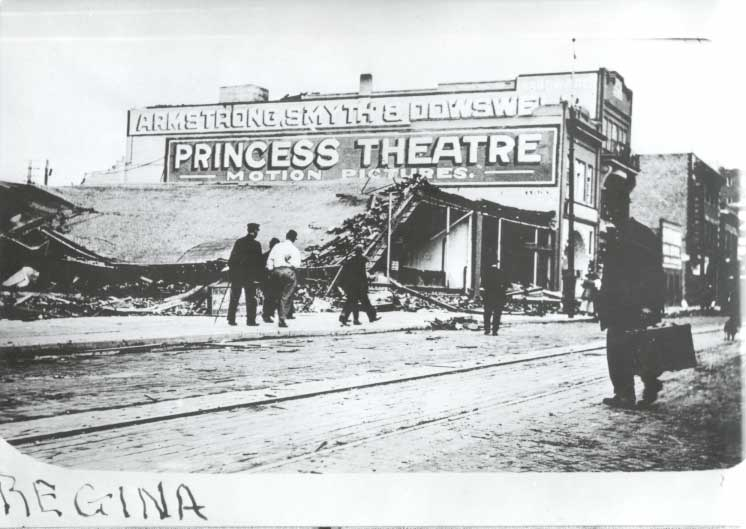
Side view of Princess Theatre after tornado

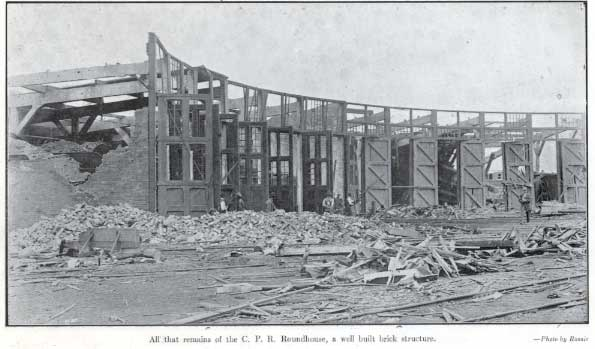
Regina Tornado June 30, 1912

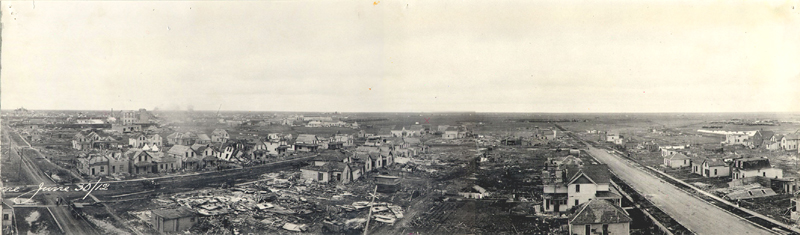
Regina downtown after tornado

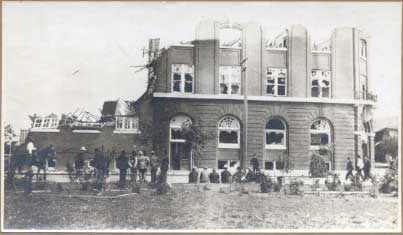
People in front of damaged building

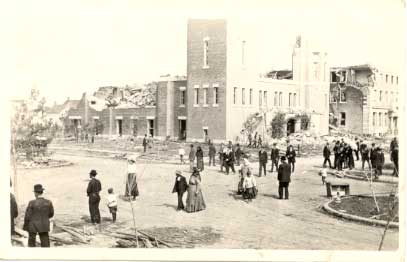
Metropolitan Methodist Church after the tornado

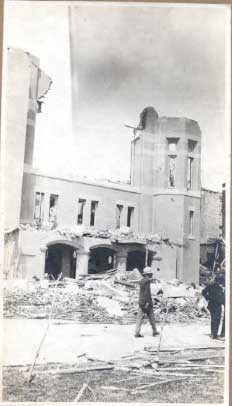
Damage to Metropolitan Methodist Church

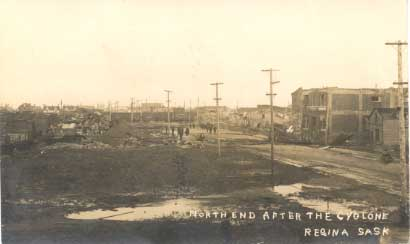
North end of Regina after tornado

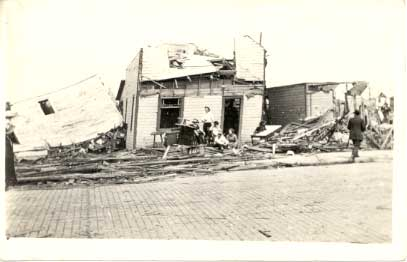
Downtown stores damaged by tornado

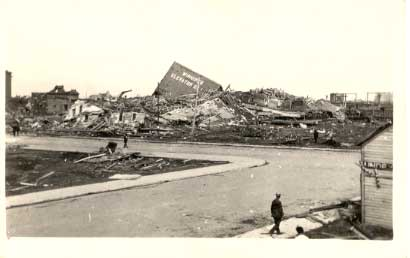
Destroyed Winnipeg Elevator Company buildings

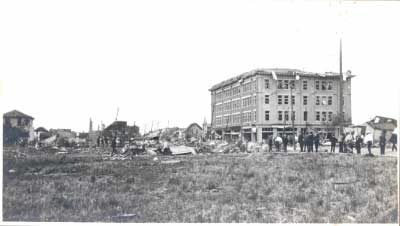
Damaged office building after tornado

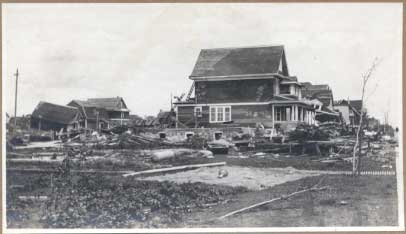
Damaged homes on Smith Street

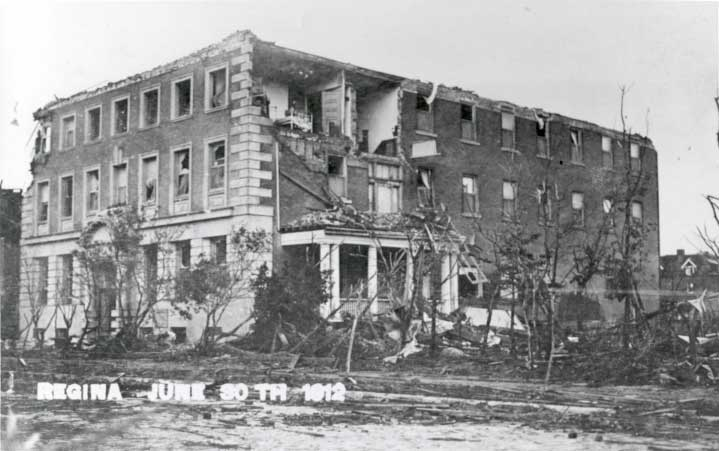
Damage to the YWCA immediately north of Metropolitan Methodist Church on Lorne Street

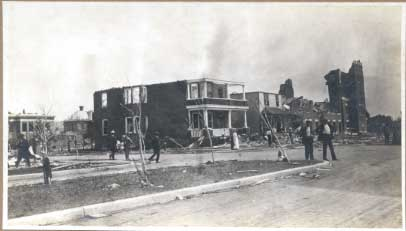
Damage to buildings after the tornado

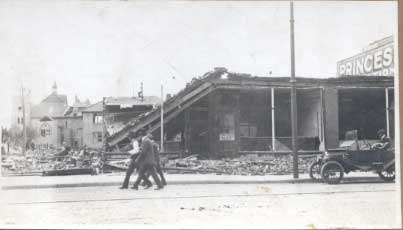
Damage to businesses after the tornado

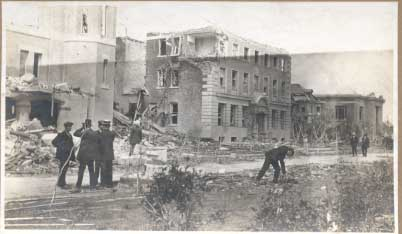
Damage to buildings on Lorne St.

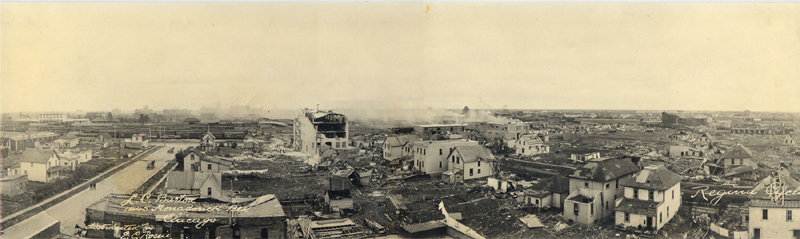
Damage caused by the tornado

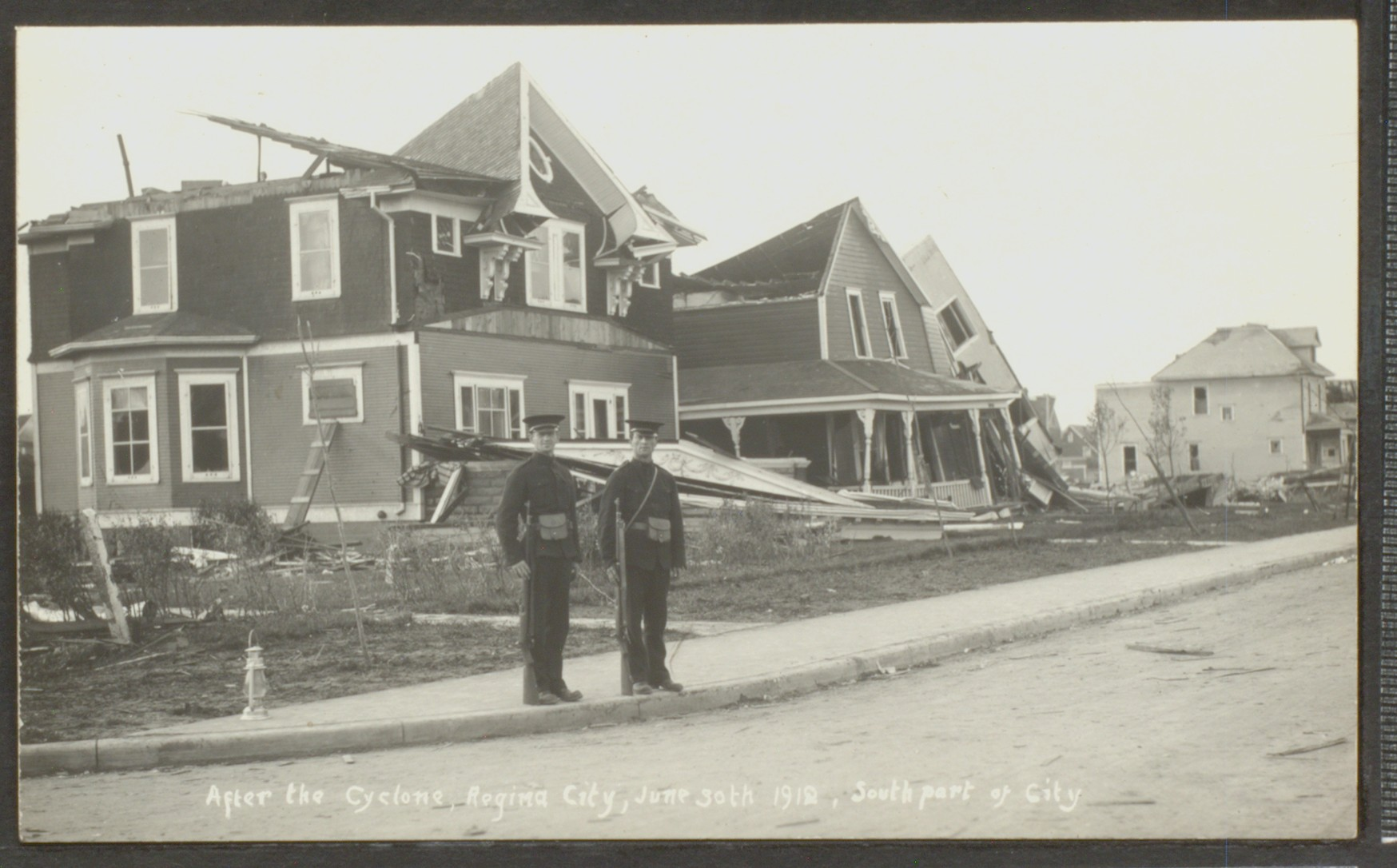
Two uniformed men stand on a sidewalk in front of a row of damaged houses.
