= RCMP Heritage Centre =

History museum in Saskatchewan, Canada

- Le Centre du patrimoine de la GRC
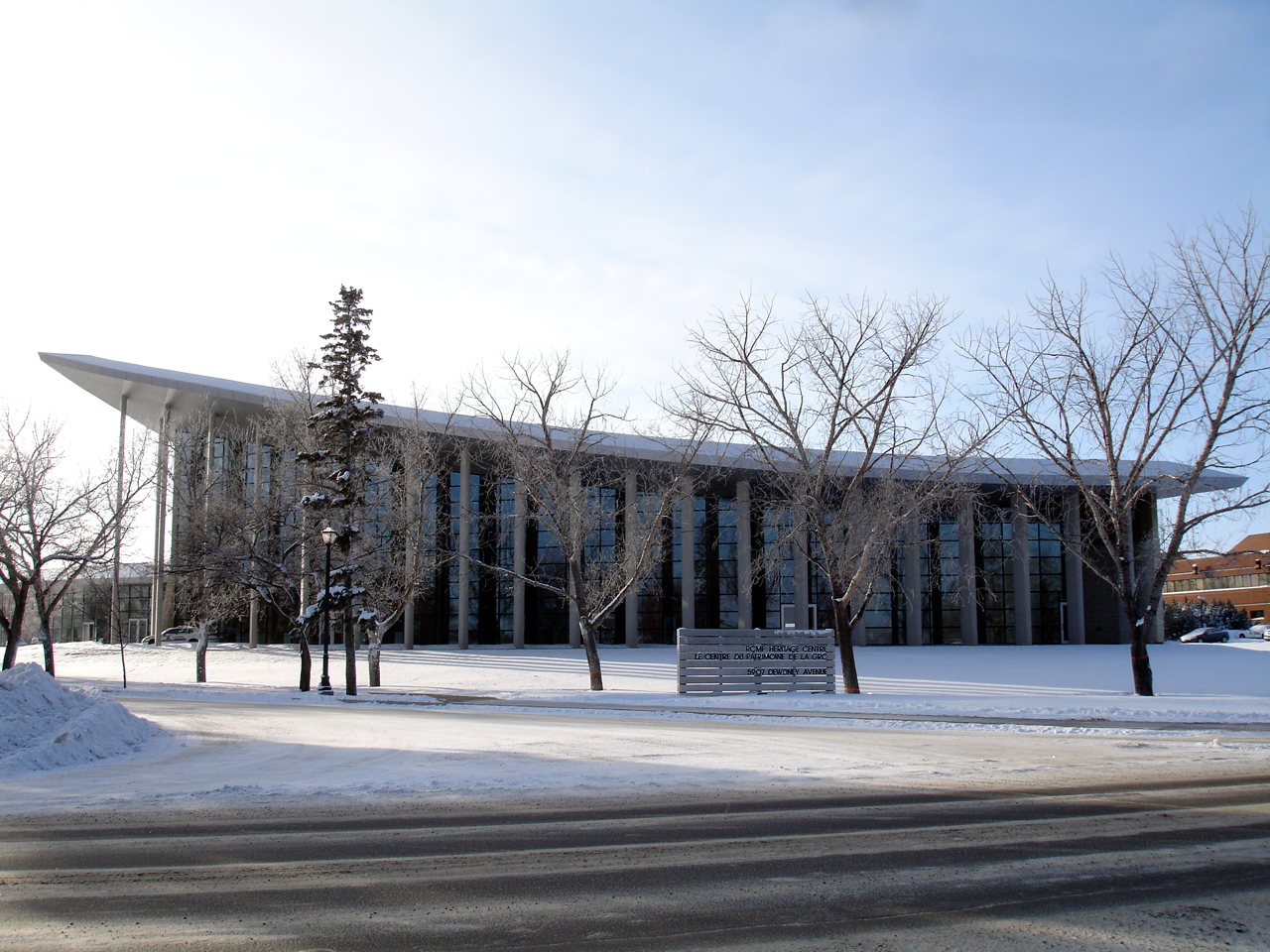
- Northern face of the RCMP Heritage Centre from Dewdney Avenue, December 2009
- Established: 23 May 2007; 19 years ago
- Location: 5907 Dewdney Avenue, Regina, Saskatchewan, Canada.
- Coordinates: 50.4542°N 104.6663°W
- Type: History museum
- CEO: Sam Karikas
- Chairperson: Kevin Dorhety
- Curator: Jodi Ann Eskritt
- Architect: Nick Milkovich Architects
- Website: www.rcmpheritagecentre.com

The RCMP Heritage Centre (French: Le Centre du patrimoine de la GRC) is a law enforcement museum located in Regina, Saskatchewan, Canada. The museum houses a number of exhibits on the Royal Canadian Mounted Police (RCMP) and artifacts relating to the police force. The heritage centre's 6,000-square-metre-building (65,000 sq ft) was designed by Nick Milkovich Architects, and is situated at the northeast end of RCMP Academy, Depot Division.

Construction for the RCMP Heritage Centre began in 2005 to replace the RCMP Centennial Museum, also located at the Depot Division. The RCMP Heritage Centre was officially opened to the public in May 2007.

== History ==
The first museum of the Royal Canadian Mounted Police, the RCMP Centennial Museum, was opened to the public in 1933. Situated at RCMP Academy, Depot Division in Regina, Saskatchewan, the Centennial Museum was later closed to the public in October 2006. The RCMP Heritage Centre was established in order to replace the Centennial Museum, and its collections relocated to the Heritage Centre following its completion.

Construction for the RCMP Heritage Centre began in 2005. The facility was officially opened to the public on 23 May 2007.

In November 2026, plans were announced that the institution would become a national museum, with the federal government committing funding to 2029–30 to transition the centre to national muesuem status.

== Architecture ==
The centre is situated in a 6,000-square-metre-building (65,000 sq ft) south of Dewdney Avenue, adjacent to "F" Division headquarters at RCMP Academy, Depot Division in Regina, Saskatchewan, Canada. Completed in 2007, the building was estimated to have cost C$40 million. Nick Milkovich Architects was the design architect for the project, with Arthur Erickson serving as a design consultant for the building; P3 Architects served as the architect of record for the project. Construction of the building was contracted to PCL Construction.

Building materials used for the construct of the heritage centre include concrete, glass, Tyndall stone, and limestone quarried from Manitoba. The massing of the building was designed to appear like it was sinking and rising into the landscape. The building's roof resembles windblown snow, or encampments used by the First Nations and North-West Mounted Police during the 19th century. The building features a "swooping" rooftop, making the height of the building roof range between 9.1 to 19.8 metres (30 to 65 ft). The northeast exterior of the building features 21 oval-shaped columns varying from 9 to 17 metres (30 to 56 ft) in length.

The interior of the building features coloured concrete floors, with metal ceilings. The building also includes a 124-seat lecture hall/theatre.

== Exhibitions ==
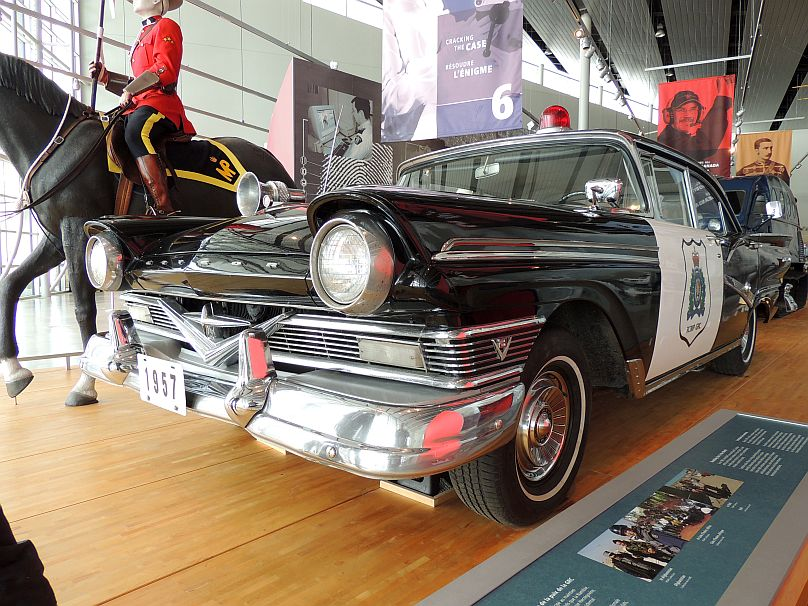
An exhibit at the RCMP Heritage Centre, April 2013

The heritage centre's main gallery holds a permanent exhibition that explores the history of the force, or exhibits practices in forensics. Exhibits in the main gallery includes Creating a Mounted Police, Maintaining Law and Order in the West, Protecting the North, Serving all of Canada, Preserving the Tradition, and Cracking the Case. The heritage centre "Feature Exhibition" is situated in a different hall, and exhibits specialty items from its collection for a limited time. A number of the items in the institution's collection originates from the collections of the defunct RCMP Centennial Museum.

Beginning in 2016, the museum also began to operate interactive virtual reality exhibits.

== See also ==
- List of museums in Saskatchewan
