= RCMP Academy, Depot Division =

Canadian police academy in Regina, Saskatchewan

Coordinates: 50.451°N 104.665°W

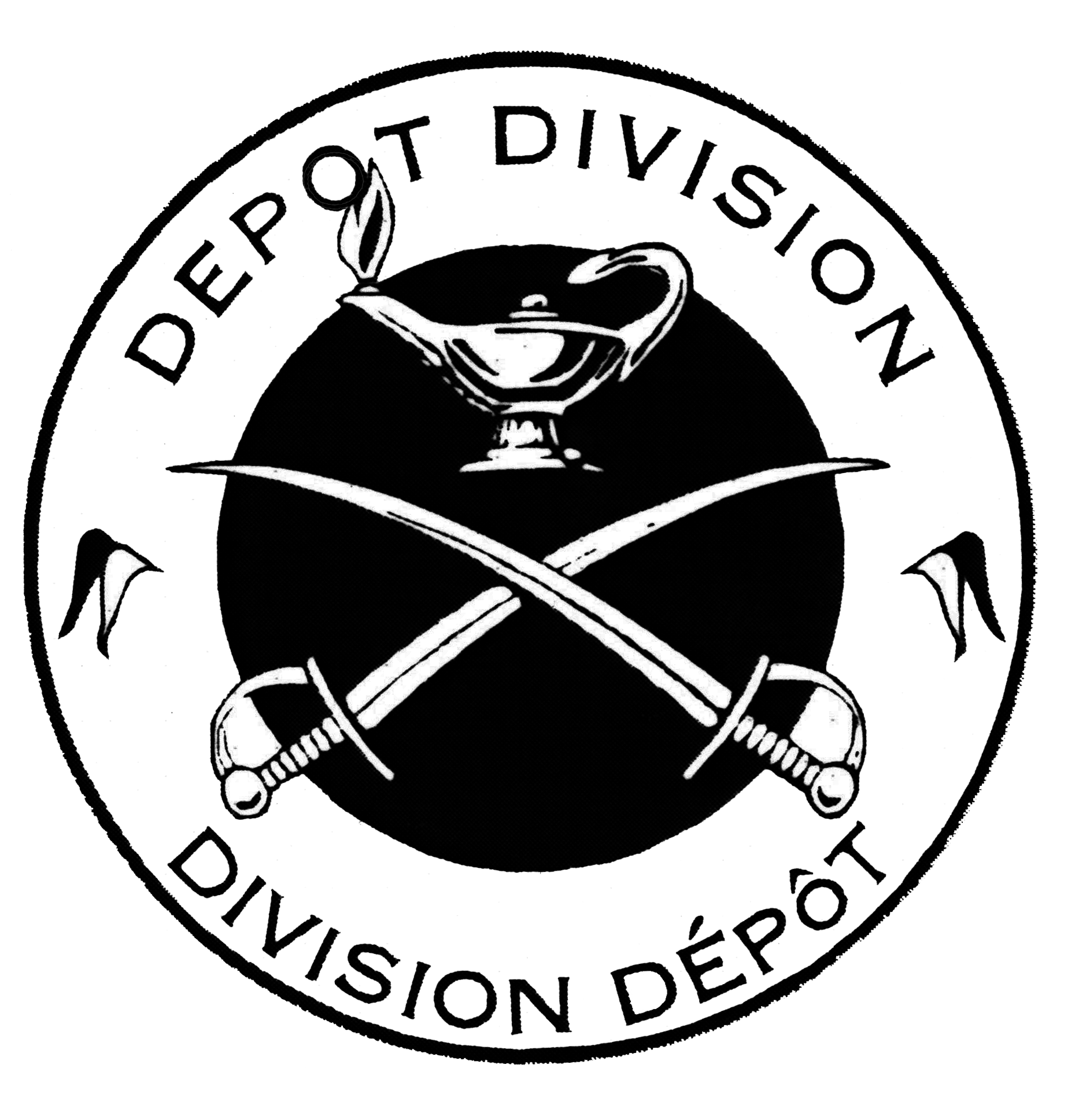
RCMP Depot Division logo

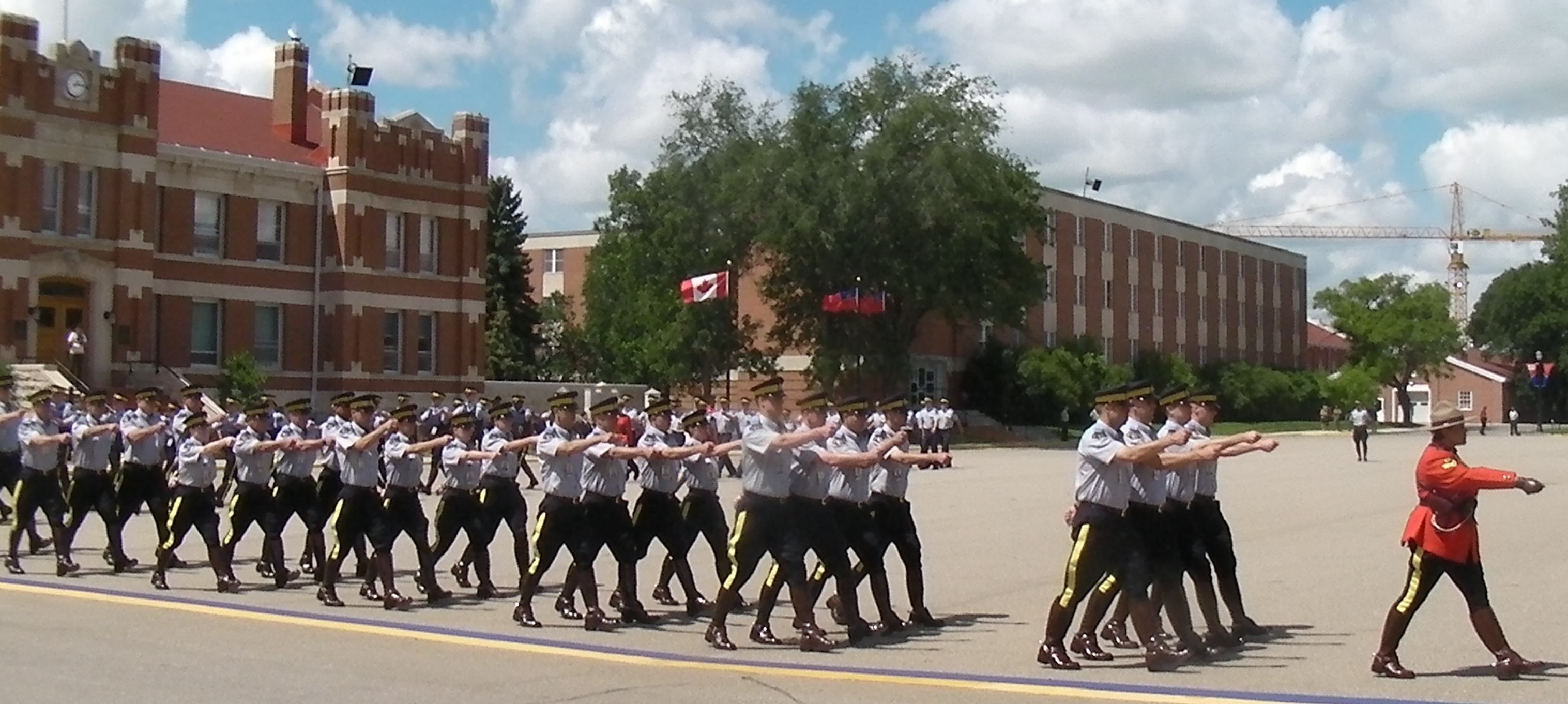
Cadets marching at Depot

RCMP Academy, Depot Division (commonly known as "Depot", /ˈdɛpoʊ/ not /ˈdiːpoʊ/) is the police training academy for Royal Canadian Mounted Police (RCMP) cadets. Providing training since its establishment in 1885, the facility is located in the west part of Regina, Saskatchewan, near the airport, and consists of several buildings.

== History ==
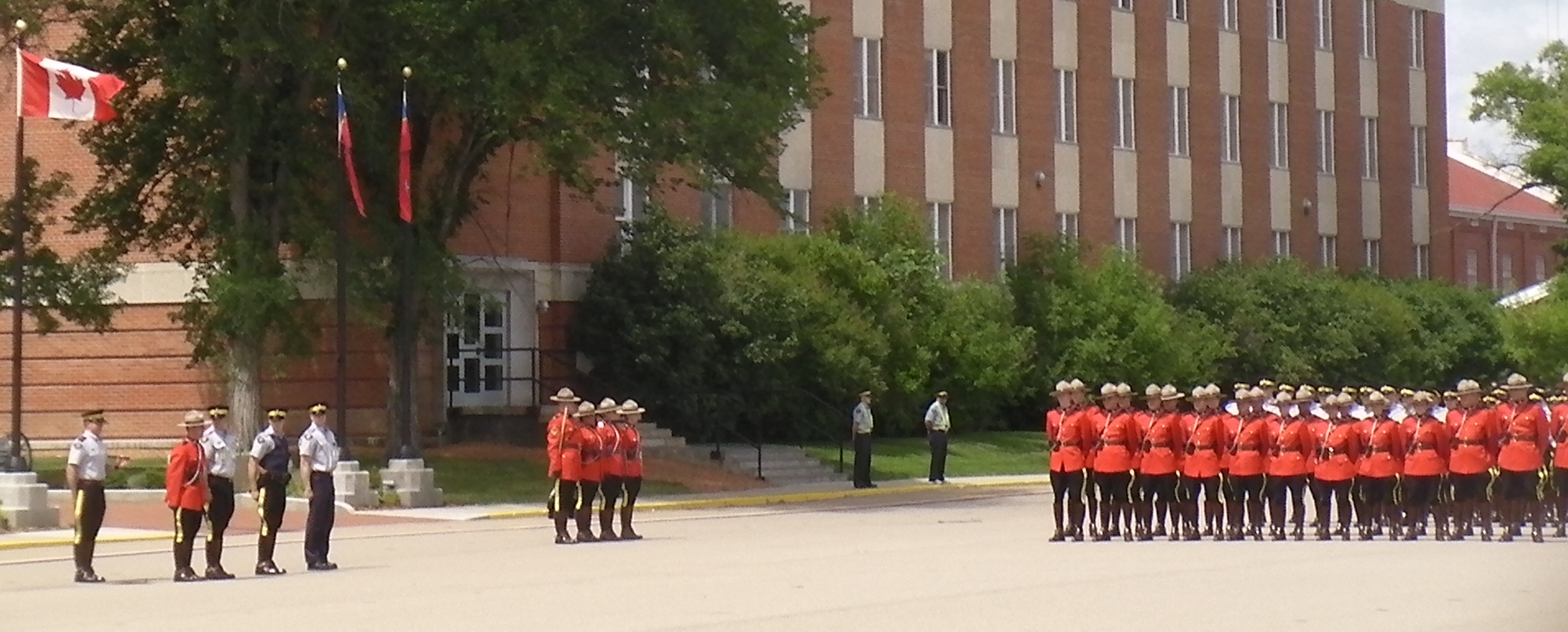
Cadets wear the red serge of the force at Noon Parade

In the RCMP's early days, Depot had a full horse stable and employed veterinarians. Horsemanship is no longer part of the cadets' training since 1966.

Depot is the only location where the RCMP trains its cadets. One of the only rare exceptions was some Mounties were trained at an Ottawa region facility in the 1950s or 1960s. This training centre, now closed, was located by the present Ottawa RCMP stables, where the horses of the RCMP Musical Ride are kept off-season. The buildings of the former Ottawa training centre have become the Canadian Police College, a Canadian government institution which offers continuing-education courses for currently employed police officers. A small number of members had part of their training at CFB Penhold in Alberta as well in the early 70s. At that time, due to extensive hiring and construction at the academy, Depot could not handle the overwhelming number of candidates. Therefore, the RCMP established the additional and temporary training facility in CFB Penhold, near Red Deer, AB.

== Training ==
In addition to training new RCMP regular members, Depot has also been a major continuing-education centre for police in Canada, but is currently tasked primarily with the training of new members and other training is conducted elsewhere. It delivers updated and highly specialized training to experienced RCMP officers and to members of other forces from around the world who want to improve their knowledge.

Cadet training is offered in either English only or in an English-French bilingual format, and is 26 weeks long. Cadets are trained in use of firearms, defensive tactics, police driving, fitness, drill, applied police sciences and more. Cadets receive an allowance during their training of CA$525 per week in exchange for a commitment to becoming an RCMP officer for two years upon hiring. Once training ends, cadets are offered employment with the RCMP and awarded the status of peace officers. They must be willing to relocate to anywhere within Canada, even to remote areas of the country.

Many Canadian municipal and provincial police forces hire police officers who graduated from the RCMP Academy. No one can join the RCMP as a regular member without completing the RCMP Academy's 26-week Cadet Training Program. Candidates who are graduates of a police training institution and have served a minimum of two years in a policing role with another Canadian police agency can undergo a five-week learning and orientation program rather than the full 26-week program.

The RCMP Academy has altered its curriculum due to the social and economic changes of Canadian society; the school now focuses more on knowledge relating to the multiple facets of law enforcement than on military discipline. In the early 1990s, the six-month thorough military-style RCMP training was slightly modified to face the new make-up of trainees. Cadets are now 10 years older than their 1950s or 1960s counterparts; and decade after decade, the ratio of college and university-educated future Mounties keeps increasing. The higher maturity level of trainees requires fewer disciplinary actions and enables the instructors to focus on the very demanding requirements of modern police work.

After the recruitment process, successful candidates are scheduled to attend the Academy and begin the Cadet Training Program. Cadets are grouped together in what the force calls "troops". A troop consists of a maximum of 32 men and women who follow their entire 26-week training together. The number of trainees at Depot varies in relation to the demands of the force.

== Physical fitness standards ==
Physical fitness is a central requirement of cadet training at Depot. Applicants are expected to arrive with an established fitness baseline, as the program is not designed as a beginner conditioning course.

=== Police Fitness Assessment (PFA) ===
As of April 1, 2024, the RCMP replaced the Physical Abilities Requirements Evaluation (PARE) with the Police Fitness Assessment (PFA), developed in consultation with serving officers to better reflect the demands of police work.

The PFA consists of four stations simulating real policing scenarios:

- Foot pursuit a 500-metre run with directional changes, including
- Climbing a 1.4-metre chain-link fence
- Physical control pushing and pulling a sled with 37 kg of resistance
- Evacuation carry simulating a rescue task
- Rapid deployment simulating an active threat response

Cadets at Depot must pass the "gold standard" version of the PFA before graduating. After graduation, officers complete a portable "field test" version every three years as part of mandatory block training.

== Buildings ==
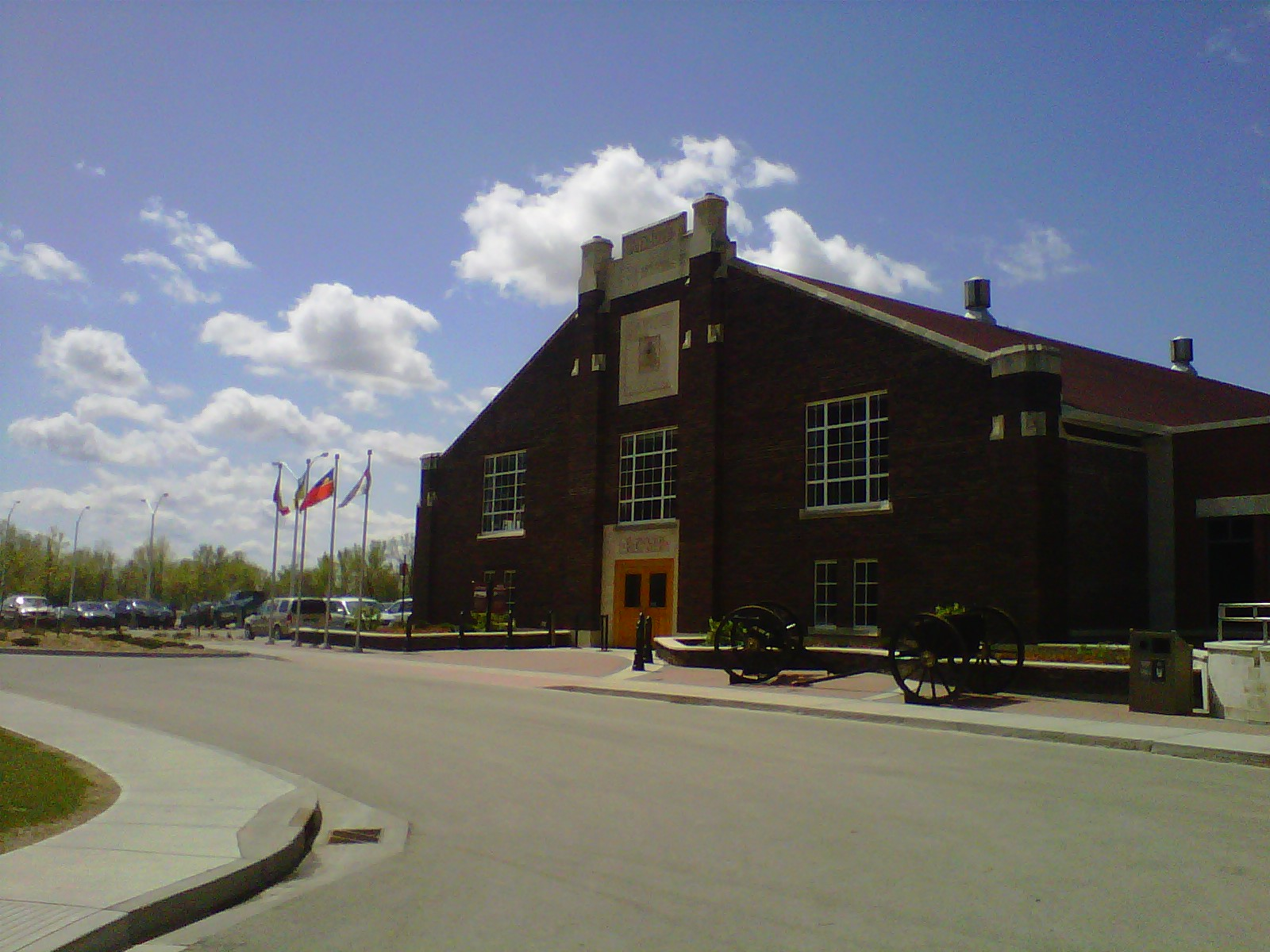
Drill Hall

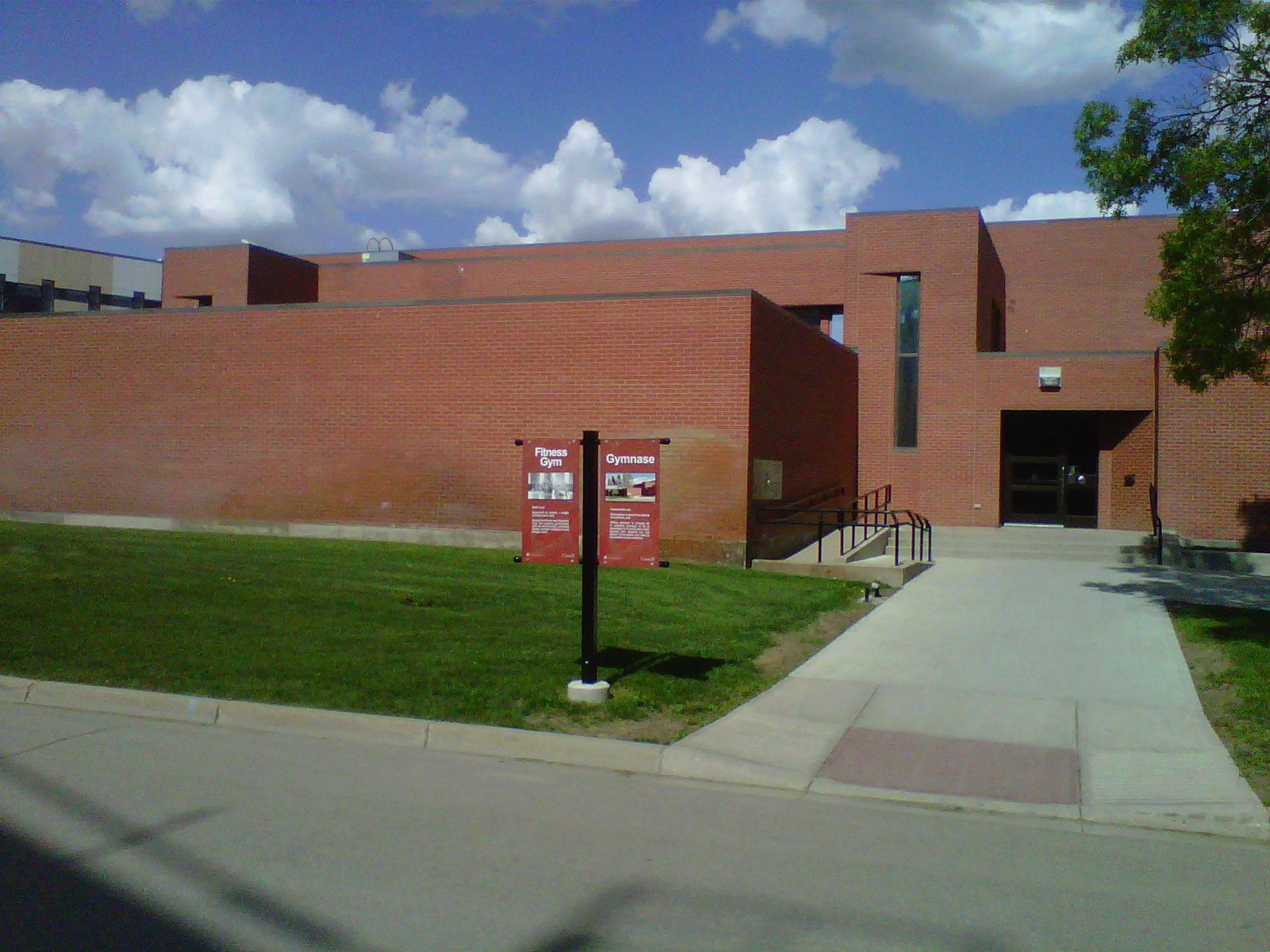
Fitness Centre

Buildings at Depot include the following:

- Applied Police Sciences Building Building — contains classrooms, 100-seat theatre, specialized computer classrooms and various syndicate rooms.
- Armourer's Shop
- Centennial Building
- Centralized Training Facility — offers serving members and outside agencies both modern classrooms and accommodations.
- Chapel
- Firearms Complex — includes two 25-metre indoor ranges and a 100-metre indoor range, all of which have 16 positions. There are a number of modern classrooms, as well as firearm training simulators.
- Fitness Centre (aka "New Gym")
- Drill Hall — built in 1929 as a Riding School, it now provides for the teaching of foot drill and crowd control. It is also used for many social functions including Troop Graduations and Regimental Balls.
- Headquarters Building — built in 1913 and is located on the original site of the headquarters of the North-West Mounted Police. It was formerly named A Block and is now named for Commissioner A. B. Perry.
- Learning Resource Centre — has an extensive collection of law enforcement reference materials, an in-house automated catalogue, on-line connection to the University of Regina and the Regina Public Library collections, as well as several Internet workstations.
- Learning Technology Centre — Equipped with a full video conferencing suite for distance learning or corporate communication, this building also contains creative service bureaus, that include video and photo studios, multimedia and graphics units as well as a print shop.
- Medical Treatment Centre — contains a health clinic, infirmary with several beds, treatment and therapy rooms. It has a full-time staff of medical personnel, including a Medical Doctor, Nurse, Psychologist and Physiotherapist.
- Model Detachment and Town Site
- Old Gym
- Police Driving Unit — spread around Depot, it includes a large modern vehicle fleet as well as six 4x4 vehicles. There are a number of tracks that simulate various driving conditions.
- RCMP Heritage Centre

=== Armourer's Shop ===
This building provides for the inspection and preparation of new firearms for issue; complete repair, reconditioning and maintenance of firearms; training on firearms maintenance and repair, quality assurance of ammunition; consultation services in the field of small arms and ammunition; testing of bullet-proof vests and material and warranty services for many firearms manufacturers.

=== Chapel ===
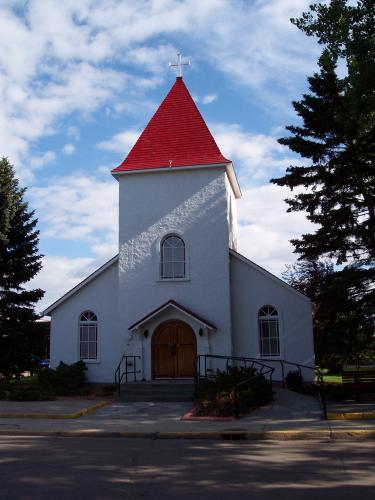
RCMP Chapel

The oldest remaining building in Regina is the RCMP chapel, dating from the earliest establishment of the North-West Mounted Police (NWMP) as a guardhouse in 1883. It subsequently served as a mess hall and canteen and became a chapel in 1895. It was constructed in Ontario and moved by flatcar, steamer and ox team to Regina.

The chapel was built by Mr. John Ross, a local building contractor. Originally a mess hall it was partially destroyed by fire in the spring of 1895. After its restoration it was converted to a chapel.

The wife of the police commissioner, Mrs. Herchmer, wanted a chapel for the force members, who were located 2 miles (3.2 km) west of town. NWMP carpenters converted the mess hall to a chapel, making the altar and pews themselves. The chapel was dedicated on December 8, 1895.

The Institute for Stained Glass in Canada has documented the stained glass at the RCMP Museum Chapel. On each side of the altar is a stained glass memorial window, each portrays a member of the force. On the left is a constable in mourning; on the right is a bugler sounding reveille. The model for the windows was Constable John Roy Fraser of Westville, Nova Scotia, in 1943. Fraser retired in 1960 at the rank of staff sergeant. The Memorial Project came about following the shooting of Constable Willis Edward Rhodeniser on the White Bear Reserve near Carlyle, Saskatchewan, on August 26, 1939. Two more stained glass memorial windows on each side wall near the front were dedicated on November 4, 1951. The Resurrection in the west window honours serving members and The Nativity in the east window honours ex-members of the force who died in the Second World War.

The chapel is one of the oldest Anglican houses of worship in western Canada, but today has only two monthly religious services. There is an Ecumenical (Protestant) service on the second Sunday of each month and a Roman Catholic service on the fourth Sunday of each month at 10 am.

=== Centennial Building ===
Formerly the RCMP Centennial Museum. Established in 1933, the RCMP Museum operated in a number of facilities for its first sixty years. The museum was officially opened on its present site in 1973 by Elizabeth II, Queen of Canada, in honour of the RCMP's centennial. The museum contained many artifacts relating to the colourful history and traditions of the RCMP. The museum permanently closed in October 2006 and the collection moved to the RCMP Heritage Centre. The building now houses an auditorium, simulator training classroom and mess hall.

=== Gym ===
The gym, commonly referred to as the Old Gym, is equipped with a self-defence gymnasium and a 26-metre swimming pool.

Commonly referred to as the New Gym, the Fitness Centre includes a large gymnasium and a state-of-the-art cardio and weight training facility complete with treadmills, steppers, stationary bikes, free weights and various types of weight training equipment. This facility was expanded in 2007.

=== Model Detachment and Town Site ===
Opened in 1994, the Buffalo Detachment, is a replica of a modern working RCMP Detachment, complete with everything you would find in such a facility. It provides the main hub of training at the Academy. A second detachment, known as "Eagle detachment" has since been implemented to accommodate larger troop loads.

Surrounding the Model Detachment, the Town Site provides for a more realistic and safe environment during practical simulation scenarios.

=== RCMP Heritage Centre ===
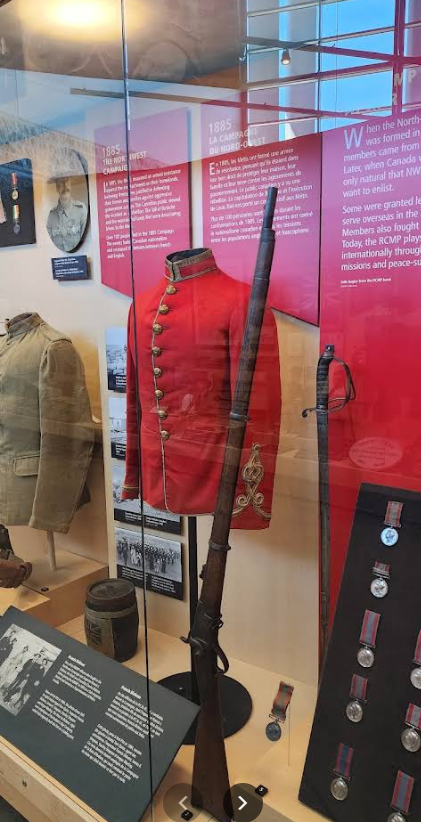
Early North-West Mounted Police uniform and equipment displayed at the RCMP Heritage Centre in Regina, Saskatchewan. The red serge tunic, rifle, sword, and medals represent NWMP service during the late 19th century, including the 1885 North-West Campaign. Learn more about the North-West Mounted Police:

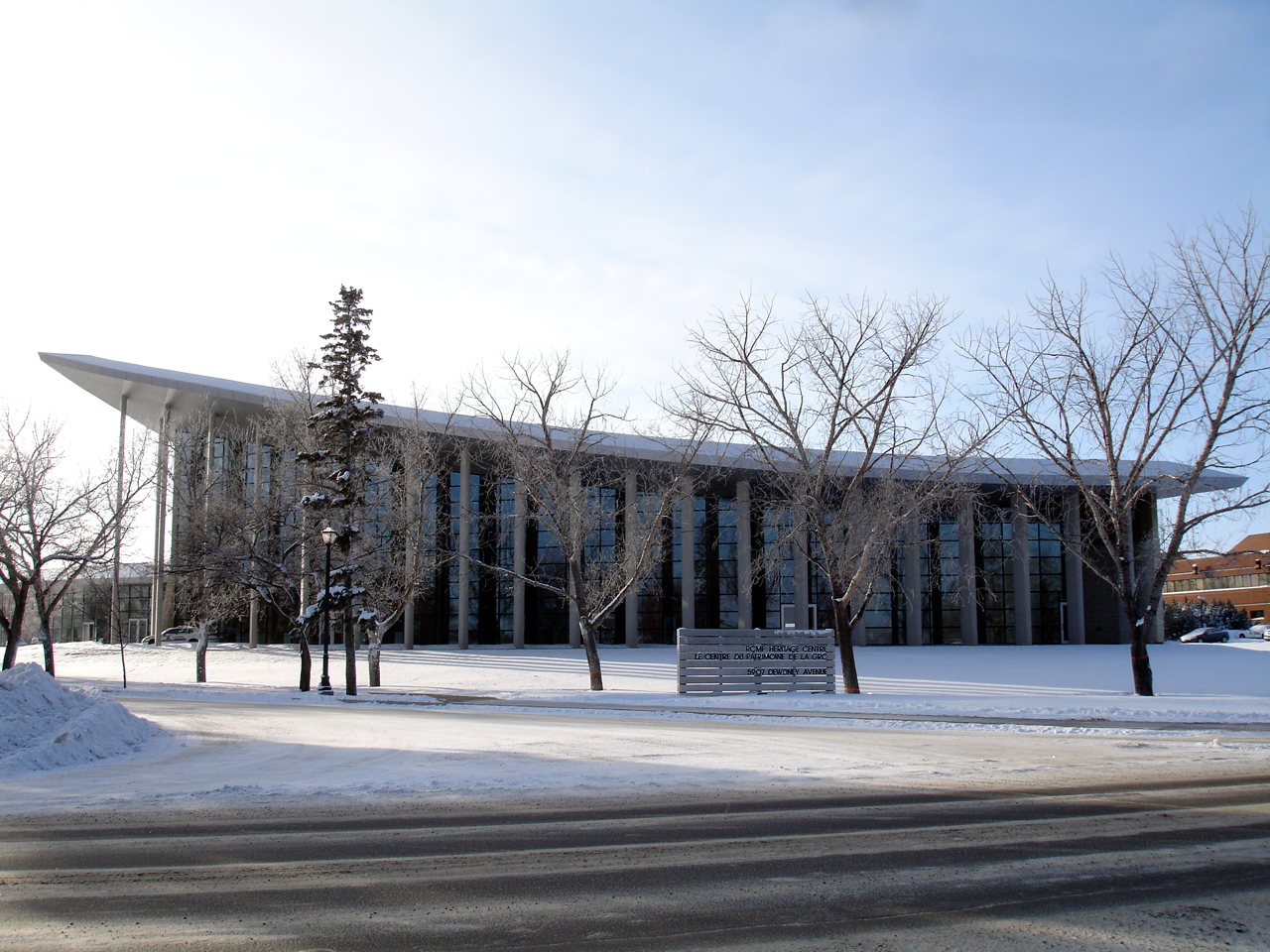
RCMP Heritage Centre in Regina, Saskatchewan designed by Canadian architect Arthur Erickson

Opened in May 2007, the RCMP Heritage Centre is a non-profit, volunteer governed, charitable organization incorporated under the Non-Profit Corporations Act of Saskatchewan.

== See also ==
- FBI Academy
- Garda Síochána College
