= Flag of Regina =

Canadian city flag

Regina
- Proportion: 5:8
- Adopted: 29 June 1992
- Design: A horizontal bicolour of yellow and navy blue with a crown in the top hoist corner

The flag of Regina is the banner representing the city of Regina, Saskatchewan, Canada. The flag is composed of a horizontal bicolour of yellow and navy blue accompanied by a crown in the top hoist corner. It was presented to the city on September 14, 1992, by the Governor General at the time. Prior to 1992, it was purple. That flag had a royal connection reflecting the city's royal roots. However, the flag was unofficial.

== History ==
The current flag was adopted at the meeting of 29 June 1992. Before that, the city had an unofficial flag in use since 1968 featuring a purple field and an off-centre bright orange circle with a white outline containing a stylized crown that was described in a June 10, 1992 column by the Leader Post Ron Petrie as "the spitting image of an overturned patio table." In an attempt to modernize the city's image, a new flag was adopted inspired by the coat of arms.

== Blazon ==
The blazon is as follows:

Azure a base Or in canton a representation of the Royal Crown Argent;
