= Regina, Saskatchewan =

Capital city of Saskatchewan, Canada

Regina
- City and provincial capital
- City of Regina
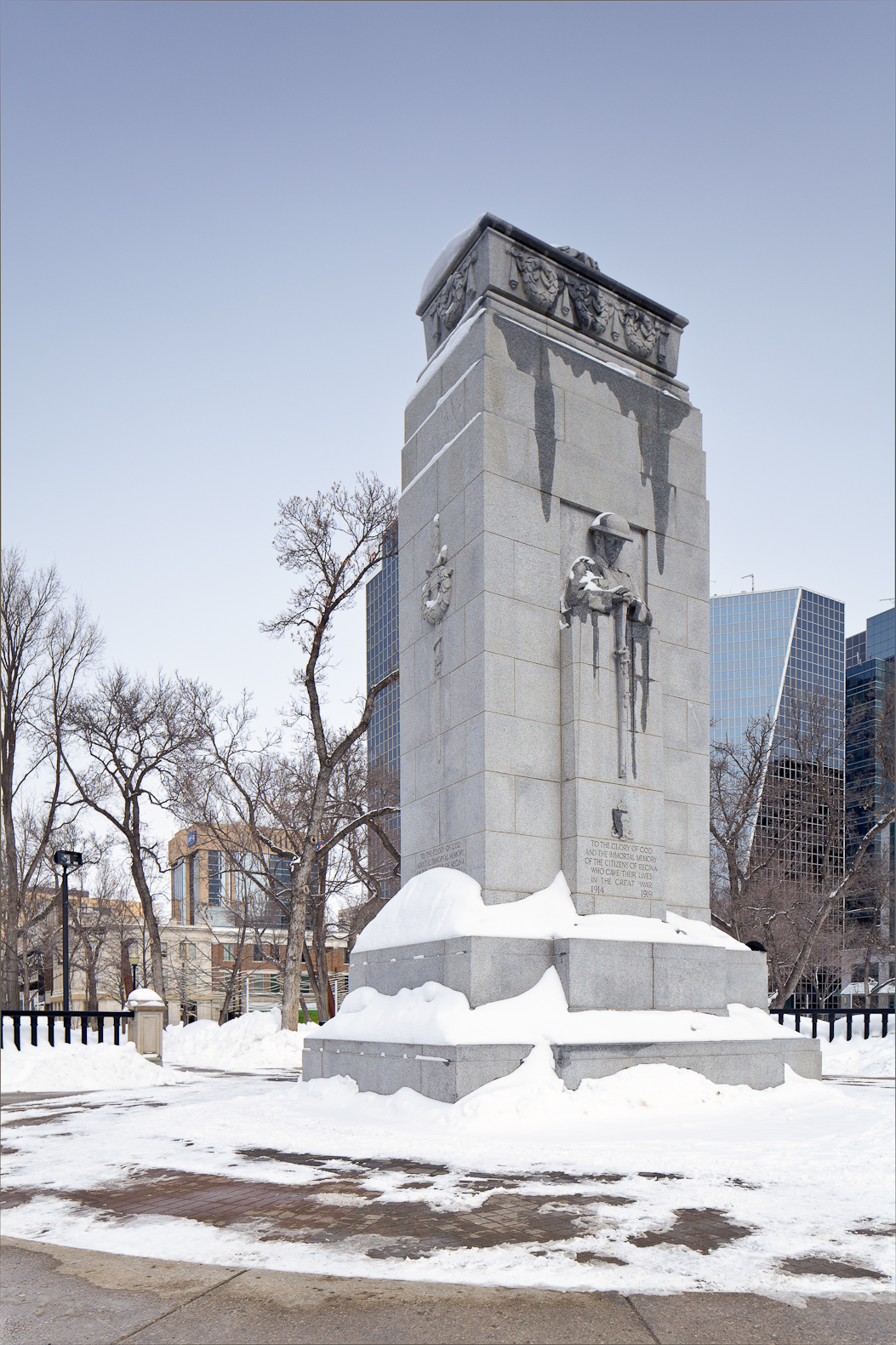
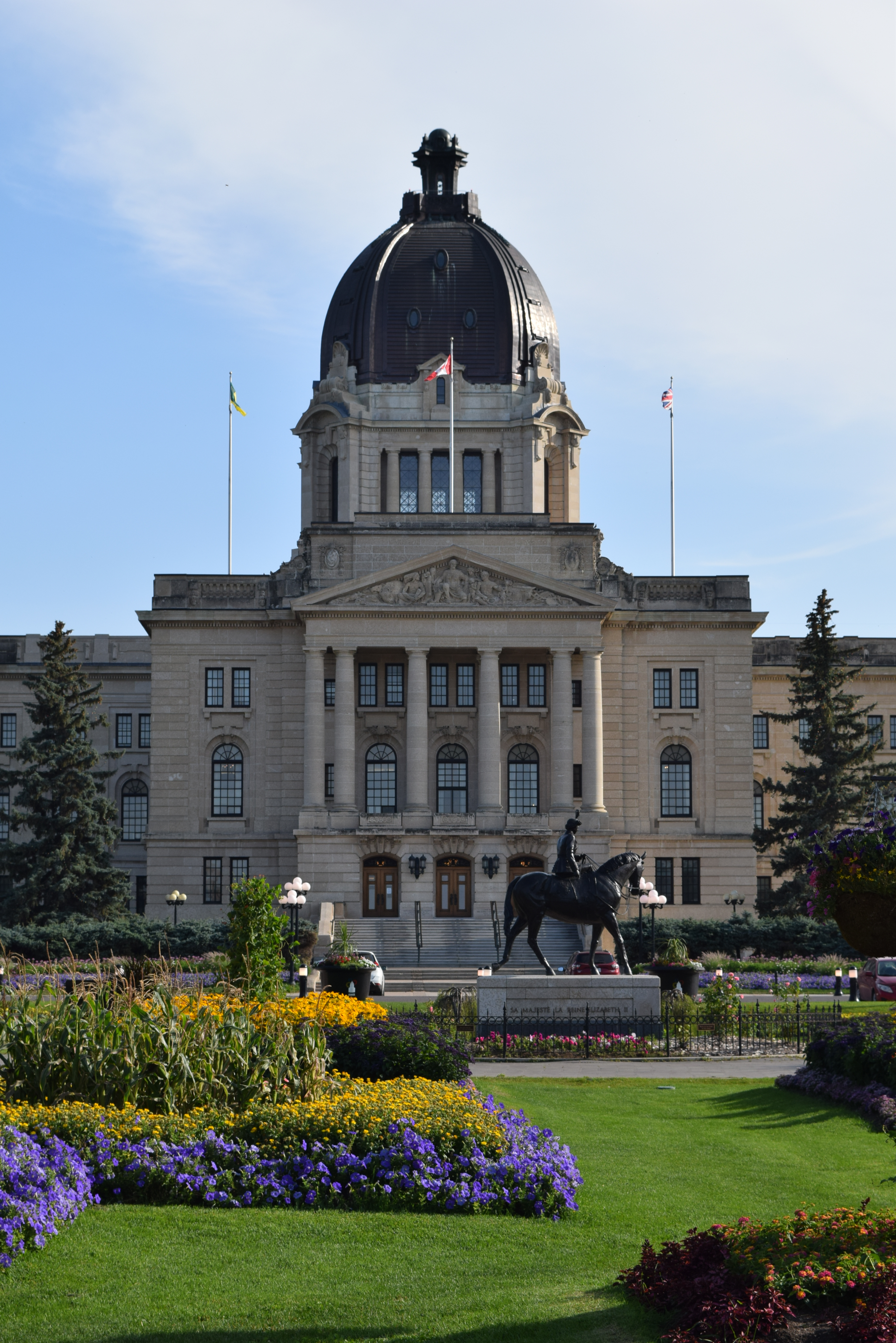
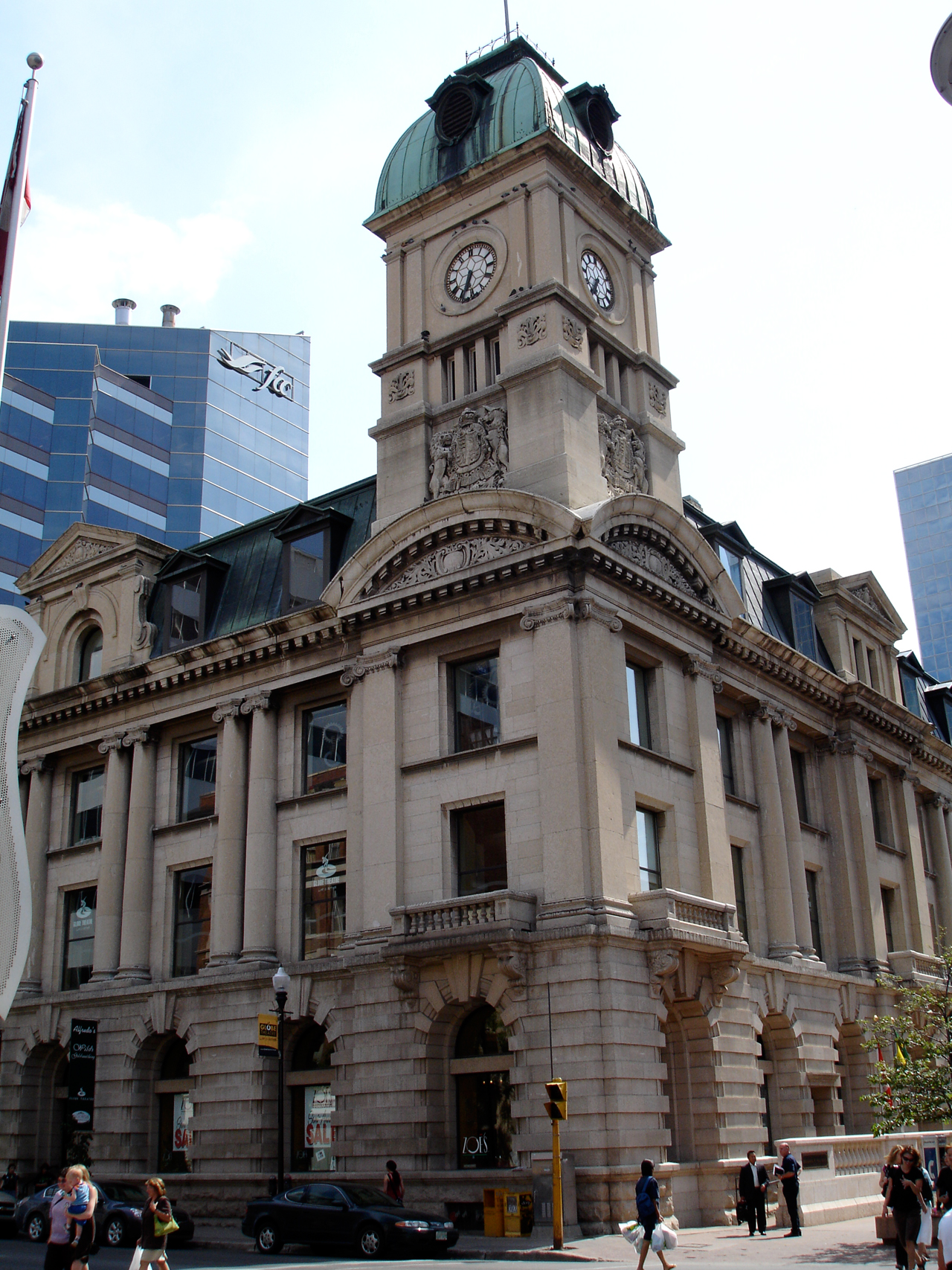
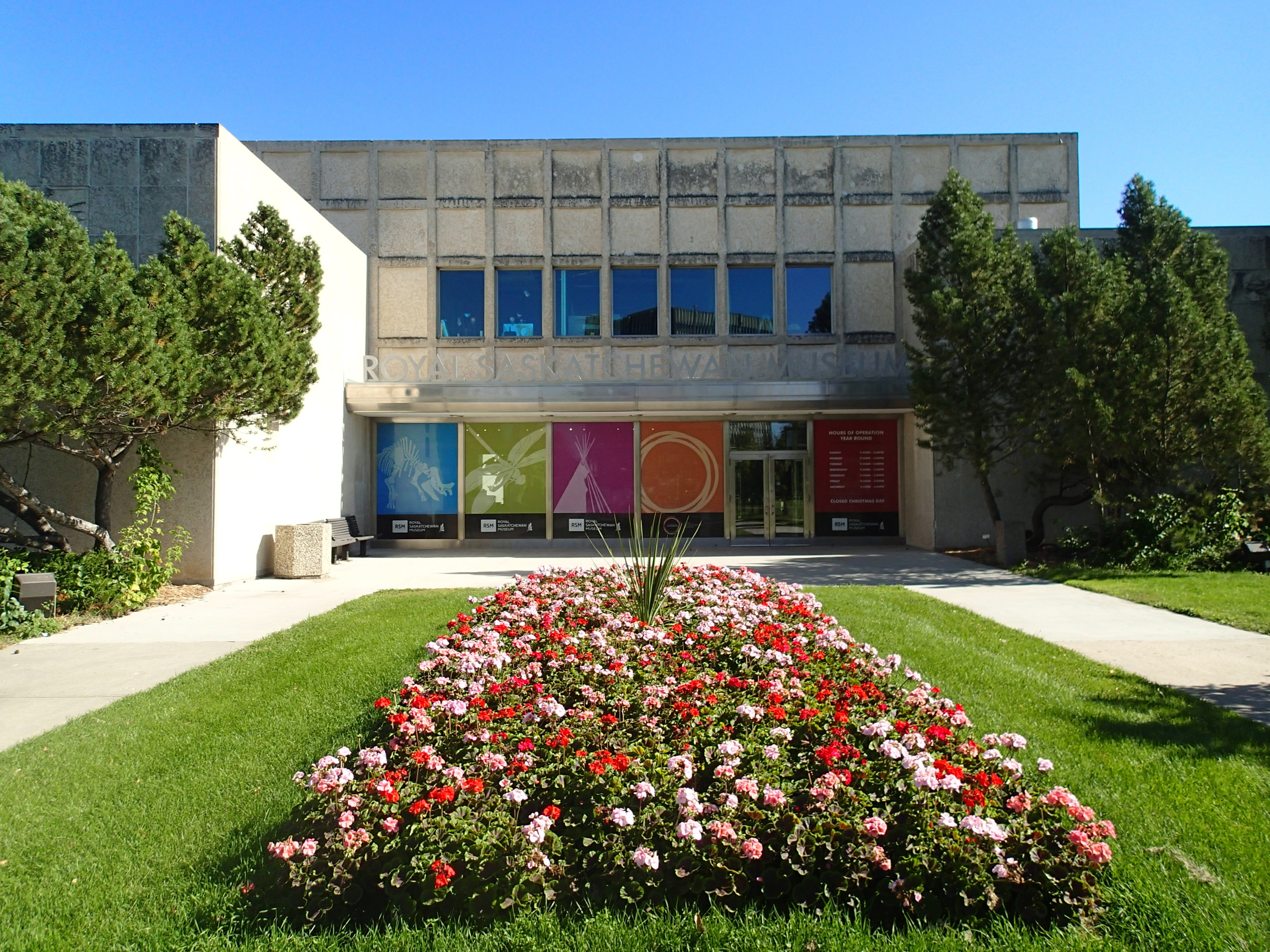
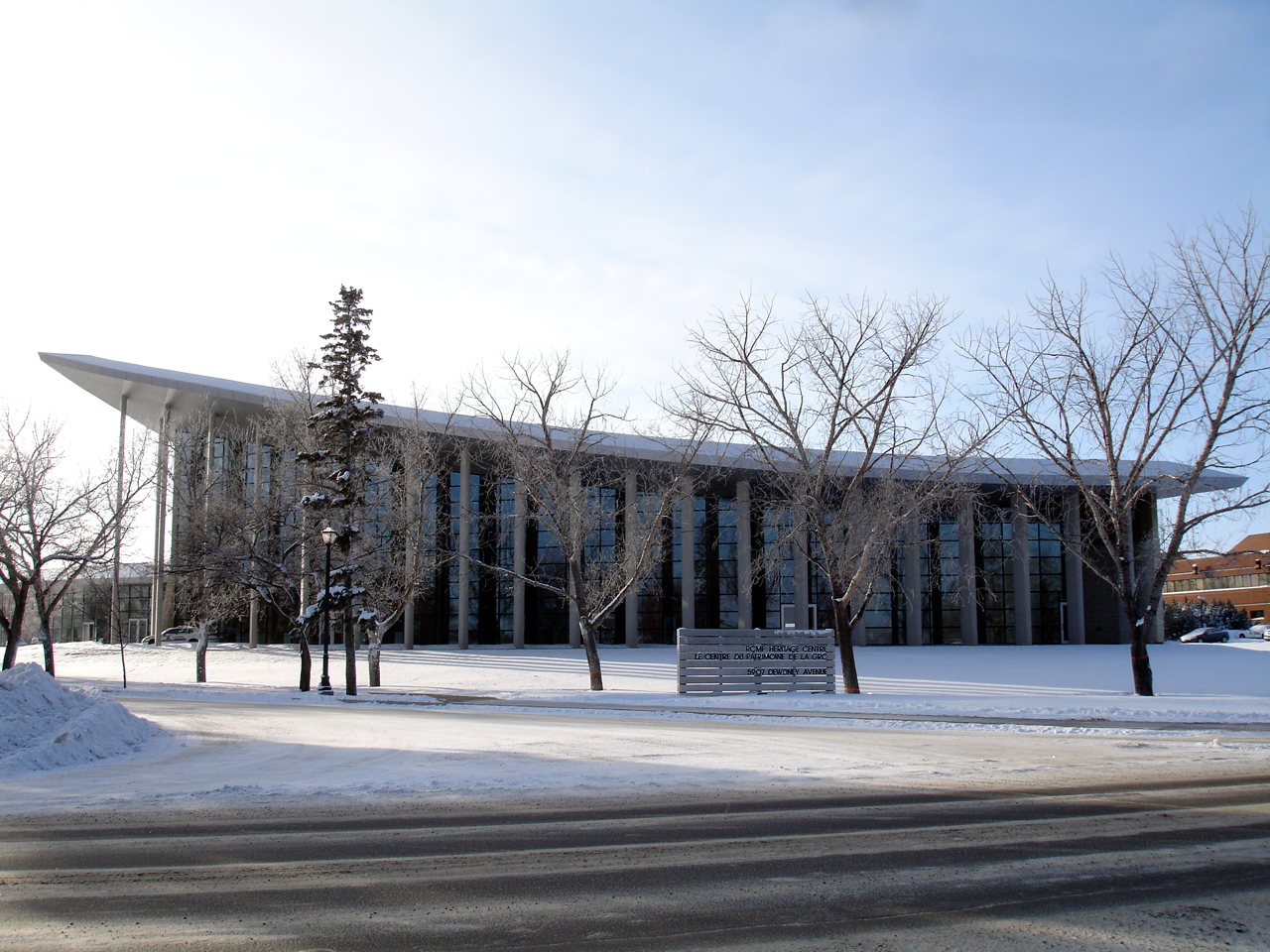
- Downtown Regina The Cenotaph at Victoria Park Saskatchewan Legislative Building Prince Edward Building Royal Saskatchewan Museum RCMP Heritage Centre From top, left to right: Downtown Regina skyline, Victoria Park, Saskatchewan Legislative Building, Prince Edward Building, Dr. John Archer Library the Royal Saskatchewan Museum.

- Flag Coat of arms Logo
- Nicknames: "The Queen City"
- Motto: Floreat Regina ("May Regina Flourish")
- Location within Saskatchewan Location within Canada
- Coordinates: 50°27′17″N 104°36′24″W
- Country: Canada
- Province: Saskatchewan
- Established: 1882
- Named for: Latin for "queen", named for Queen Victoria

Government
  - City Mayor: Chad Bachynski
  - Governing body: Regina City Council List of City Councillors: Cheryl Stadnichuk, Ward 1; Bob Hawkins, Ward 2; Andrew Stevens, Ward 3; Lori Bresciani, Ward 4; John Findura, Ward 5; Daniel LeBlanc, Ward 6; Terina Nelson, Ward 7; Shanon Zachidniak, Ward 8; Jason Mancinelli, Ward 9; Landon Mohl, Ward 10
  - MPs: List of MPs: Michael Kram (CPC); Andrew Scheer (CPC); Warren Steinley (CPC)
  - MLAs: List of MLAs: Carla Beck (NDP); Noor Burki (NDP); Jared Clarke (NDP); Meara Conway (NDP); Muhammad Fiaz (SKP); Gary Grewal (SKP); Gene Makowsky (SKP); Laura Ross (SKP); Nicole Sarauer (NDP); Christine Tell (SKP); Trent Wotherspoon (NDP); Aleana Young (NDP)

Area
  - City and provincial capital: 178.81 km^{2} (69.04 sq mi)
  - Metro: 4,323.66 km^{2} (1,669.37 sq mi)
- Elevation: 577 m (1,893 ft)

Population (2021)
  - City and provincial capital: 226,404 (ranked 24th)
  - Density: 1,266.2/km^{2} (3,279/sq mi)
  - Metro: 249,217 (ranked 18th)
  - Metro density: 57.6/km^{2} (149/sq mi)
- Demonym: Reginan

Gross Metropolitan Product
  - Regina CMA: CA$17.5 billion (2020)
- Time zone: UTC−06:00 (CST)
- Forward sortation area: S4K – S4Z
- Area codes: 306, 639, and 474
- NTS Map: 72I7 Regina
- GNBC Code: HAIMP
- Website: regina.ca

Regina (/rɪˈdʒaɪnə/ rih-JY-nə) is the capital city of the Canadian province of Saskatchewan. The city is the second-largest in the province, after Saskatoon, and is a commercial centre for southern Saskatchewan. As of the 2021 census, Regina had a city population of 226,404 and a metropolitan area population of 249,217. It is governed by Regina City Council. The city is surrounded by the Rural Municipality of Sherwood No. 159.

Regina was the seat of government of the North-West Territories, which contained the District of Assiniboia, where Regina was located, and the current provinces of Saskatchewan and Alberta. The site had been called Wascana (from Cree: ᐅᐢᑲᓇ, romanized: Oskana, lit. 'Buffalo Bones'), but was renamed to Regina (Latin for "Queen") in 1882 in honour of Queen Victoria. The name was proposed by Queen Victoria's daughter, Princess Louise, who was the wife of the Governor General of Canada, the Marquess of Lorne.

Due to its location on a treeless flat plain, Regina has few topographical features other than the small spring run-off, Wascana Creek. Early planners took advantage of such opportunity by damming the creek to create a decorative lake to the south of the central business district with a dam a block and a half west of the later elaborate 260-metre-long (850 ft) Albert Street Bridge across the new lake. Regina's importance was further secured when the federal government designated Regina as the seat of government for the new province of Saskatchewan in 1905. Wascana Centre, created around the focal point of Wascana Lake, remains one of Regina's attractions and contains the Provincial Legislative Building, both campuses of the University of Regina, the First Nations University of Canada, the Royal Saskatchewan Museum, the Regina Conservatory (in the original Regina College buildings), the Saskatchewan Science Centre, the MacKenzie Art Gallery and the Saskatchewan Centre of the Arts.

Residential neighbourhoods include precincts beyond the historic city centre which are historically or socially noteworthy neighbourhoods – namely Lakeview and The Crescents, both of which lie directly south of downtown. Immediately to the north of the central business district is the old warehouse district, increasingly the focus of shopping, nightclubs and residential development; as in other western cities of North America, the periphery contains shopping malls and big box stores.

In 1912, the Regina Cyclone destroyed much of the town; and in the 1930s, the Regina Riot brought further attention during the 1930s drought and Great Depression, which hit the Canadian Prairies particularly hard with their economic focus on dry land grain farming. The CCF (now the NDP, a major left-wing political party in Canada), formulated its foundational Regina Manifesto of 1933 in Regina. Regina became known as a centre of political activism and experimentation as its people adjusted to new, reduced economic realities by ascribing to the co-operative movement and public healthcare. This included Tommy Douglas leading the CCF to victory in 1944 and wielding power in Regina's capital buildings. In 2007 Saskatchewan's agricultural and mineral resources came into demand again, and Saskatchewan was described as entering a new period of strong economic growth.

== History ==
=== Early history (1882–1945) ===
Regina was established as the territorial seat of government in 1882 when Edgar Dewdney, the lieutenant-governor of the North-West Territories, insisted on the site over the better developed Battleford, Troy and Fort Qu'Appelle (the latter some 30 miles or 48 kilometres to the east, one on rolling plains and the other in the Qu'Appelle Valley between two lakes). These communities were considered better locations for what was anticipated to be a metropole for the Canadian plains. These locations had ample access to water and resided on treed rolling parklands. "Pile-of-Bones", as the site for Regina was then called (or, in Cree, ᐅᐢᑲᓇ ᑳᐊᓵᐢᑌᑭ Oskana kâ-asastêki), was by contrast located in arid and featureless grassland.

Lieutenant-Governor Dewdney had acquired land adjacent to the route of the future CPR line at Pile-of-Bones, which was distinguished only by collections of bison bones near a small spring run-off creek, some few kilometres downstream from its origin in the midst of what are now wheat fields. There was an "obvious conflict of interest" in Dewdney's choosing the site of Pile-of-Bones as the territorial seat of government and it was a national scandal at the time. But until 1897, when responsible government was accomplished in the Territories, the lieutenant-governor and council governed by fiat and there was little legitimate means of challenging such decisions outside the federal capital of Ottawa. There, the Territories were remote and of little concern. Princess Louise, Duchess of Argyll, wife of the then Governor General of Canada, named the new community "Regina", in honour of her mother, Queen Victoria.

Commercial considerations prevailed and the town's authentic development soon began as a collection of wooden shanties and tent shacks clustered around the site designated by the CPR for its future station, some 3.2 kilometres (2.0 mi) to the east of where Dewdney had reserved substantial landholdings for himself and where he sited the Territorial (now the Saskatchewan) Government House.

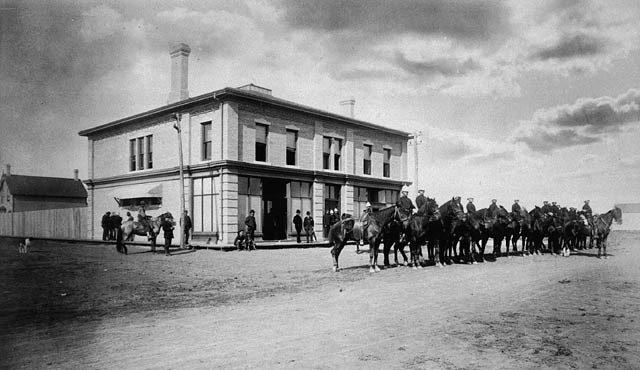
The Regina Court House during Louis Riel's trial in 1885. He was brought to Regina following the North-West Rebellion.

Regina attained national prominence in 1885 during the North-West Rebellion when troops were mostly able to be transported by train on the CPR from eastern Canada as far as Qu'Appelle Station, before marching to the battlefield in the further Northwest – Qu'Appelle having been the major debarkation and distribution centre until 1890 when the completion of the Qu’Appelle, Long Lake, and Saskatchewan Railway linked Regina with Saskatoon and Prince Albert. Subsequently, the rebellion's leader, Louis Riel, was tried and hanged in Regina – giving the infant community increased and, at the time, not unwelcome national attention in connection with a figure who was generally at the time considered an unalloyed villain in anglophone Canada. The episode, including Riel's imprisonment, trial and execution, brought the new Regina Leader (later the Leader-Post) to national prominence.

Regina was incorporated as a city on 19 June 1903, with the MLA who introduced the charter bill, James Hawkes, declaring, "Regina has the brightest future before it of any place in the North West Territories". Several years later the city was proclaimed the capital of the 1905 province of Saskatchewan on 23 May 1906, by the first provincial government, led by Premier Walter Scott; the monumental Saskatchewan Legislative Building was built between 1908 and 1912.

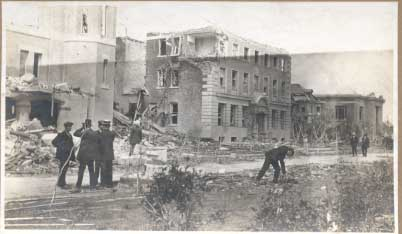
In June 1912, a tornado locally referred to as the Regina Cyclone devastated the city. The tornado remains the deadliest recorded tornado in Canadian history.

The "Regina Cyclone" was a tornado that devastated the city on 30 June 1912 and remains the deadliest tornado in Canadian history, with a total of 28 fatalities, the population of the city having been 30,213 in 1911. Green funnel clouds formed and touched down south of the city, tearing a swath through the residential area between Wascana Lake and Victoria Avenue, continuing through the downtown business district, rail yards, warehouse district, and northern residential area. The disaster attracted national attention. A young Boris Karloff was appearing in Regina as part of a theatrical group, which put on a benefit performance to assist in relief efforts. The next week, the group donated half of the proceeds from their performances in Saskatoon for Regina relief.

From 1920 to 1926, Regina used Single transferable vote (STV), a form of proportional representation, to elect its councillors. Councillors were elected in one at-large district. Each voter cast just a single vote, using a ranked transferable ballot.

Regina grew rapidly until the beginning of the Great Depression, in 1929, though only to a small fraction of the originally anticipated population explosion as population centre of the new province. By this time, Saskatchewan was considered the third province of Canada in both population and economic indicators. Thereafter, Saskatchewan never recovered its early promise and Regina's growth slowed and at times reversed.

In 1933, Regina hosted the first national convention Co-operative Commonwealth Federation (predecessor of the NDP). At the convention, the CCF adopted a programme known as the Regina Manifesto, which set out the new party's goals. In 1935, Regina gained notoriety for the Regina Riot, an incident of the On-to-Ottawa Trek. (See The Depression, the CCF and the Regina Riot.) Beginning in the 1930s, Regina became known as a centre of considerable political activism and experimentation as its people sought to adjust to new, reduced economic realities, including the co-operative movement and medicare.

=== Modern history (1945–present) ===
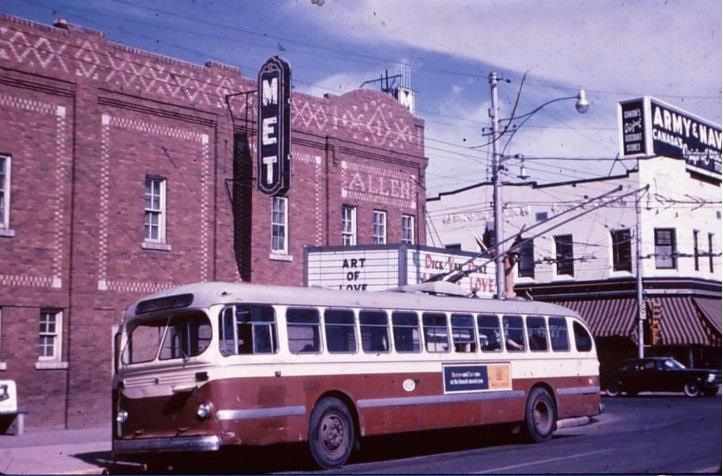
A trolleybus on Broad Street in 1965. The movie theatre and department store were later demolished. Regina saw a number of buildings demolished from 1945 to the 1970s.

The disappearance of the Simpson's, Eaton's and Army & Navy retail department stores in or near the central business district and Simpsons-Sears to the north on Broad Street, left only the Hudson's Bay Company as a large department store in Regina-centre. This, with the proliferation of shopping malls beginning in the 1960s and "big box stores" in the 1990s on the periphery, together with a corresponding drift of entertainment venues (and all but one downtown cinema) to the city outskirts, had depleted the city centre. The former Hudson's Bay Company department store (previously the site of the Regina Theatre though long vacant after that burned to the ground) has been converted into offices; Globe Theatre, located in the old Post Office building at 11th Avenue and Scarth Street, Casino Regina and its show lounge in the former CPR train station, the Cornwall Centre and downtown restaurants now draw people downtown again.

Many buildings of significance and value were lost during the period from 1945 through approximately 1970: Knox United Church was demolished in 1951; the Romanesque Revival city hall in 1964 (the failed shopping mall which replaced it is now office space for the Government of Canada) and the 1894 Supreme Court of the North-West Territories building at Hamilton Street and Victoria Avenue in 1965.

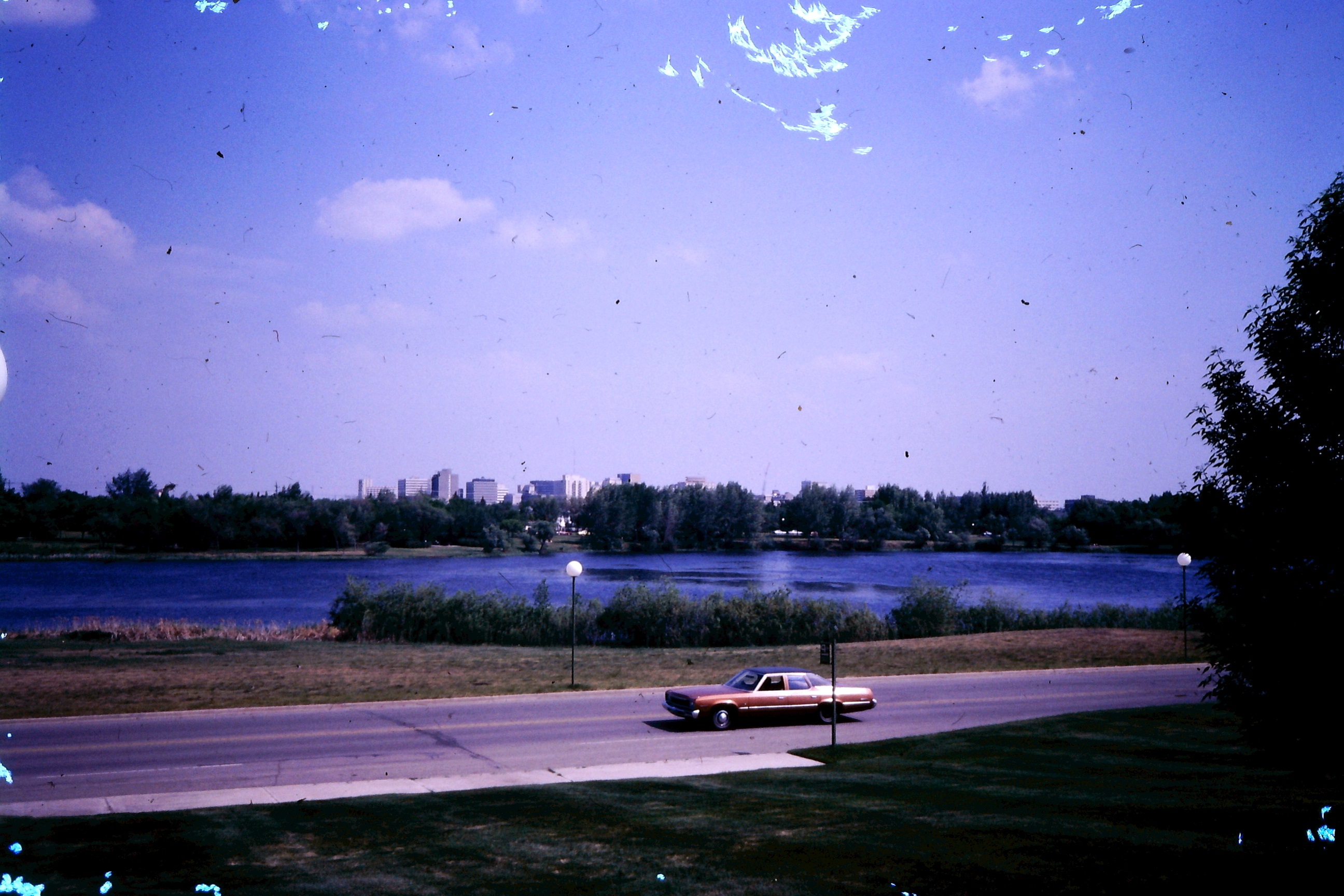
Wascana Centre in 1970, eight years after it was established

In 1962 Wascana Centre Authority was established to govern the sprawling 50-year-old, 930 ha (2,300-acre) urban park and legislative grounds. A 100-year plan was developed by World Trade Centre Architect Minoru Yamasaki and landscape architect Thomas Church, as part of developing a new University of Saskatchewan campus in the southeast end of the park. The master plan has been subsequently revised every five to seven years since, most recently in 2016. Wascana Centre has made Regina as enjoyable and fulfilling for residents as it had long been the "metropole" for farmers and residents of small neighbouring towns. Despite the setting, improbable though it always was compared with other more likely sites for the capitol, the efforts' results were favourable.

The long-imperilled Government House was saved in 1981 after decades of neglect and returned to viceregal use, the former Anglican diocesan property at Broad Street and College Avenue is being redeveloped with strict covenants to maintain the integrity of the diocesan buildings and St Chad's School and the former Sacred Heart Academy building immediately adjacent to the Roman Catholic Cathedral has been converted into townhouses.

Recently older buildings have been put to new uses, including the old Normal School on the Regina College campus of the University of Regina (now the Canada Saskatchewan Production Studios) and the old Post Office on the Scarth Street Mall. The Warehouse District, immediately adjacent to the central business district to the north of the CPR line, has become a desirable commercial and residential precinct as historic warehouses have been converted to retail, nightclubs and residential use.

== Geography ==
Regina is situated on a broad, flat, treeless plain. There is an abundance of parks and greenspaces: all of its trees — some 300,000 — shrubs and other plants were hand-planted. As in other prairie cities, American elms were planted in front yards in residential neighbourhoods and on boulevards along major traffic arteries and are the dominant species in the urban forest.

In recent years the pattern of primary and high school grounds being acreages of prairie sports grounds has been re-thought and such grounds have been landscaped with artificial hills and parks. Newer residential subdivisions in the northwest and southeast have, instead of spring runoff storm sewers, decorative landscaped lagoons.

The streetscape is now endangered by Dutch elm disease, which has spread through North America from the eastern seaboard and has now reached the Canadian prairies; for the time being it is controlled by pest management programs and species not susceptible to the disease are being planted; the disease has the potential to wipe out Regina's elm population.

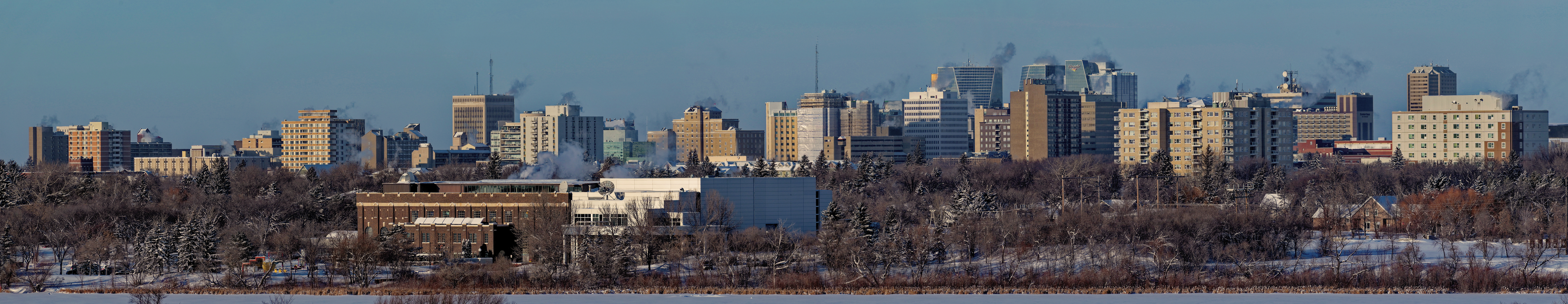
Regina downtown skyline (December 2021)

=== Climate ===
Regina experiences a warm summer humid continental climate (Köppen: Dfb bordering on Dwb), with more than 70% of average annual precipitation in the warmest six months, and is in the NRC Plant Hardiness Zone 3b. Regina has warm summers and cold, dry winters, prone to extremes at all times of the year. Average annual precipitation is 389.7 millimetres (15.34 in) and is heaviest from May through August, with June being the wettest month with an average of 75 millimetres (2.95 in) of precipitation. The average daily temperature for the year is 3.1 °C (37.6 °F). The lowest temperature ever recorded was −50.0 °C (−58 °F) on 1 January 1885, while the highest recorded temperature was 43.9 °C (111 °F) on 5 July 1937.

Climate data for Regina International Airport, 1991–2020 normals, extremes 1883–present
Month	Jan	Feb	Mar	Apr	May	Jun	Jul	Aug	Sep	Oct	Nov	Dec	Year
Record high °C (°F)	10.4 (50.7)	15.6 (60.1)	24.4 (75.9)	32.8 (91.0)	37.2 (99.0)	40.6 (105.1)	43.9 (111.0)	41.3 (106.3)	37.2 (99.0)	32.0 (89.6)	23.6 (74.5)	15.0 (59.0)	43.9 (111.0)
Mean maximum °C (°F)	3.6 (38.5)	3.6 (38.5)	12.2 (54.0)	23.7 (74.7)	29.3 (84.7)	31.7 (89.1)	33.1 (91.6)	34.2 (93.6)	31.2 (88.2)	24.1 (75.4)	13.1 (55.6)	4.3 (39.7)	35.1 (95.2)
Mean daily maximum °C (°F)	−9.3 (15.3)	−7.3 (18.9)	−0.2 (31.6)	10.6 (51.1)	18.5 (65.3)	22.5 (72.5)	25.6 (78.1)	25.4 (77.7)	19.8 (67.6)	10.6 (51.1)	0.4 (32.7)	−7.0 (19.4)	9.1 (48.4)
Daily mean °C (°F)	−14.7 (5.5)	−12.7 (9.1)	−5.5 (22.1)	3.9 (39.0)	11.0 (51.8)	15.9 (60.6)	18.6 (65.5)	17.9 (64.2)	12.4 (54.3)	4.2 (39.6)	−5.0 (23.0)	−12.1 (10.2)	2.8 (37.0)
Mean daily minimum °C (°F)	−20.0 (−4.0)	−18.1 (−0.6)	−10.8 (12.6)	−2.8 (27.0)	3.4 (38.1)	9.3 (48.7)	11.6 (52.9)	10.3 (50.5)	4.9 (40.8)	−2.4 (27.7)	−10.3 (13.5)	−17.1 (1.2)	−3.5 (25.7)
Mean minimum °C (°F)	−35.4 (−31.7)	−31.7 (−25.1)	−25.9 (−14.6)	−12.4 (9.7)	−5.5 (22.1)	2.6 (36.7)	5.3 (41.5)	3.2 (37.8)	−3.8 (25.2)	−12.2 (10.0)	−22.9 (−9.2)	−31.5 (−24.7)	−37.3 (−35.1)
Record low °C (°F)	−50.0 (−58.0)	−47.8 (−54.0)	−40.6 (−41.1)	−28.9 (−20.0)	−13.3 (8.1)	−5.6 (21.9)	−2.2 (28.0)	−5.0 (23.0)	−16.1 (3.0)	−26.1 (−15.0)	−37.2 (−35.0)	−48.3 (−54.9)	−50.0 (−58.0)
Average precipitation mm (inches)	12.8 (0.50)	8.6 (0.34)	15.4 (0.61)	27.1 (1.07)	46.5 (1.83)	84.6 (3.33)	60.0 (2.36)	50.1 (1.97)	31.6 (1.24)	25.0 (0.98)	14.7 (0.58)	13.7 (0.54)	390.1 (15.36)
Average rainfall mm (inches)	0.6 (0.02)	0.8 (0.03)	5.3 (0.21)	21.5 (0.85)	46.0 (1.81)	81.7 (3.22)	60.9 (2.40)	50.2 (1.98)	28.7 (1.13)	19.7 (0.78)	3.4 (0.13)	0.5 (0.02)	319.3 (12.57)
Average snowfall cm (inches)	20.1 (7.9)	11.4 (4.5)	18.8 (7.4)	8.9 (3.5)	3.9 (1.5)	0.1 (0.0)	0.0 (0.0)	0.0 (0.0)	0.1 (0.0)	5.9 (2.3)	14.2 (5.6)	21.4 (8.4)	104.6 (41.2)
Average precipitation days (≥ 0.2 mm)	11.3	8.8	9.2	9.5	10.3	14.2	11.3	9.9	8.7	8.8	8.7	11.3	121.9
Average rainy days (≥ 0.2 mm)	0.82	0.75	2.4	7.3	10.4	14.5	11.2	9.6	8.5	6.8	1.6	1.1	75.0
Average snowy days (≥ 0.2 cm)	12.1	9.3	9.0	3.7	1.1	0.06	0.0	0.0	0.12	2.7	8.1	12.1	58.0
Average relative humidity (%)	76.4	76.6	70.1	47.1	42.1	51.0	51.0	46.7	45.5	54.3	69.6	76.7	58.9
Average dew point °C (°F)	−17.0 (1.4)	−14.9 (5.2)	−8.4 (16.9)	−2.9 (26.8)	2.1 (35.8)	9.0 (48.2)	12.5 (54.5)	10.7 (51.3)	5.1 (41.2)	−1.1 (30.0)	−7.9 (17.8)	−14.3 (6.3)	−2.3 (27.9)
Mean monthly sunshine hours	96.1	133.5	154.5	236.6	262.4	277.7	325.4	287.4	198.1	163.3	97.9	85.4	2,318.2
Percentage possible sunshine	36.3	47.2	42.0	57.3	54.8	56.6	65.8	63.9	52.1	48.9	36.0	34.0	49.6
Average ultraviolet index	1	1	2	4	6	7	7	6	4	2	1	0	3
Source 1: Environment Canada and Weather Atlas
Source 2: weatherstats.ca (for dewpoint and monthly&yearly average absolute maximum&minimum temperature)

== Cityscape ==
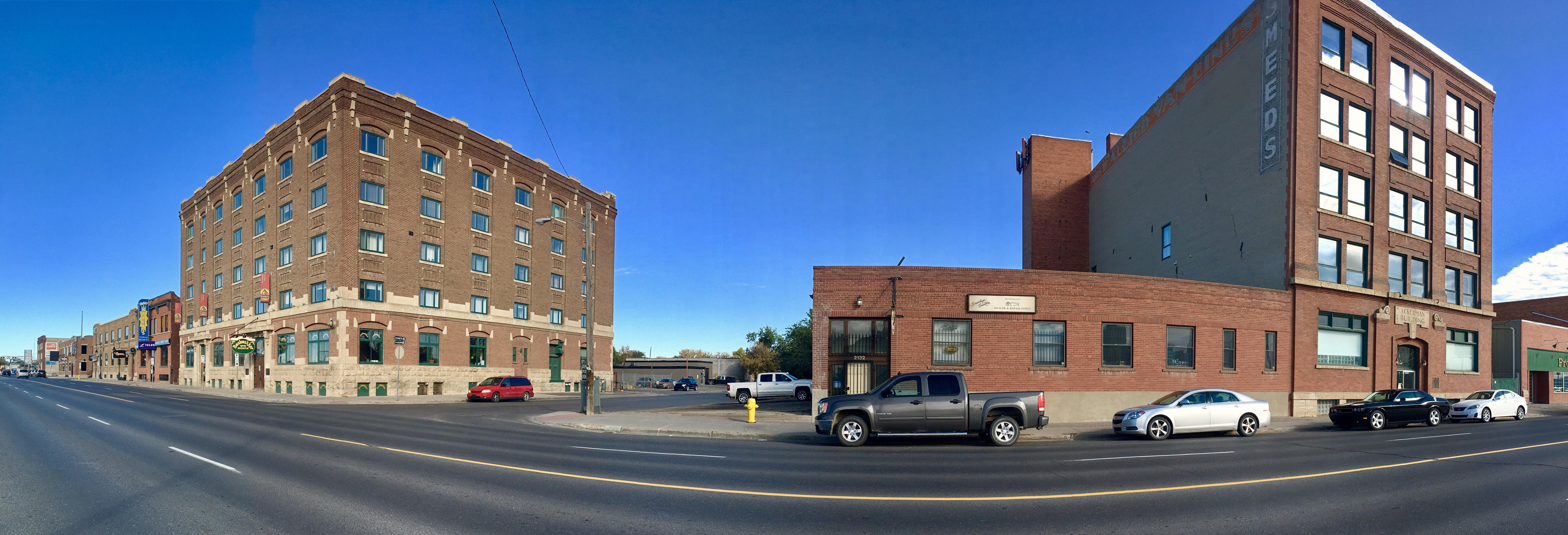
Formerly the reception zone for freight, the Warehouse District is a neighbourhood that has been the subject of redevelopment in the early 21st century.

Some neighbourhoods of note include:

1. the remaining residential portion of the original town between the CPR tracks and Wascana Lake
2. the downtown business district, deemed "Market Square";
3. the Cathedral Area;
4. the historic and affluent Crescents area, immediately to the north of Wascana Creek west of the Albert Street bridge and dam which creates Wascana Lake;
5. Germantown, originally a poor and ill-serviced area of continental Europeans;
6. Lakeview, adjacent to the provincial Legislative Building and office buildings, a neighbourhood of some imposing mansions dating from before the First World War through the post-War '20s boom; and
7. the Warehouse District, formerly the reception zone for freight, being redeveloped as desirable residential accommodation, restaurants, nightclubs and shopping precincts.

=== Bedroom communities ===
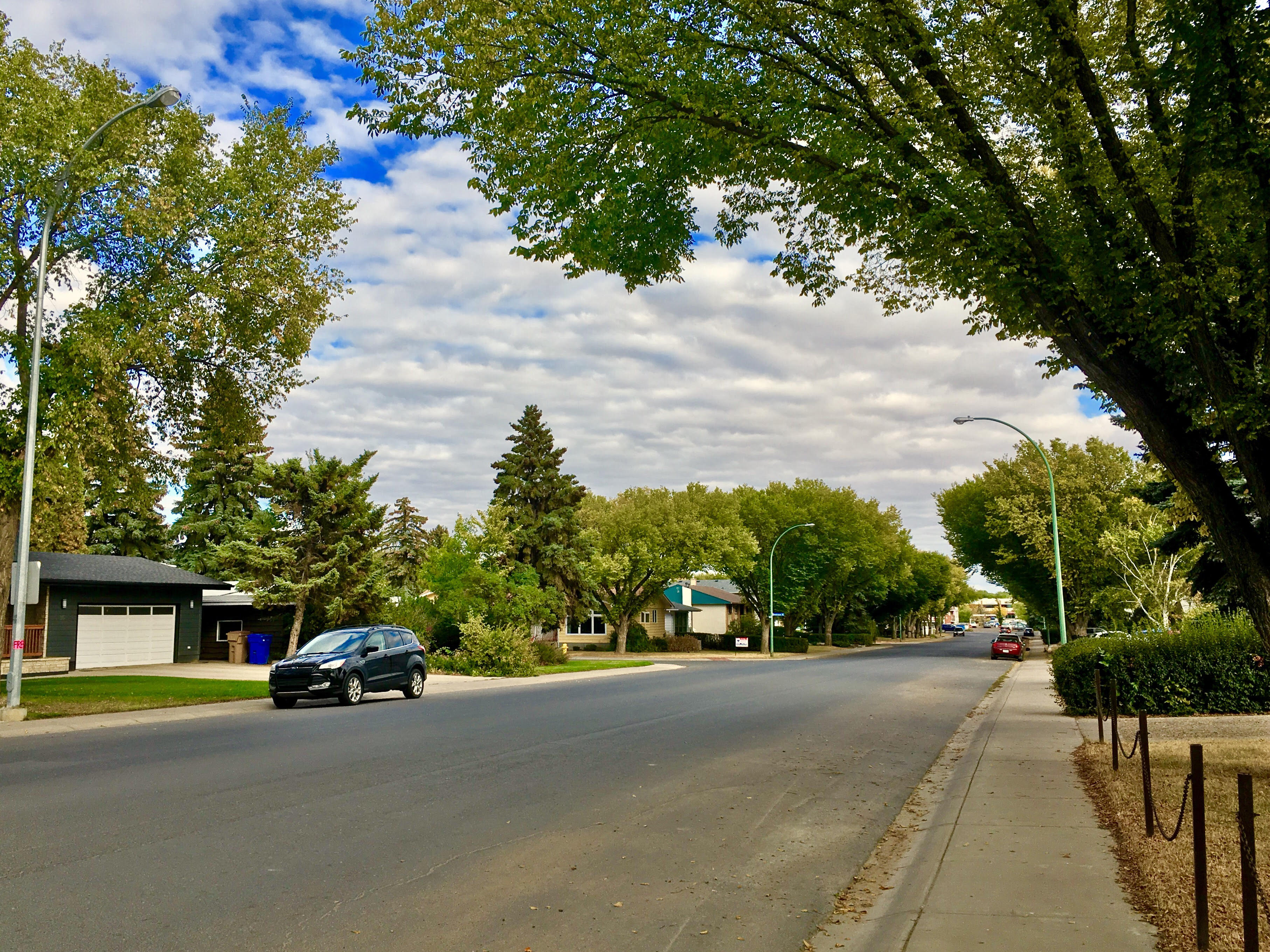
Streetscape of a typical residential neighbourhood in Regina

From its first founding, particularly once motorcars were common, Reginans have retired to the nearby Qu'Appelle Valley on weekends, for summer and winter holidays and indeed as a place to live permanently and commute from. Since the 1940s, many of the towns near Regina have steadily lost population as western Canada's agrarian economy reorganised itself from small family farm landholdings of a quarter-section (160 acres or 65 ha, the original standard land grant to homesteaders) to the multi-section (a "section" being 640 acres or 260 ha) landholdings that are increasingly necessary for economic viability.

Some of these towns have enjoyed something of a renaissance as a result of the excellent roads that for many decades seemed likely to doom them; they, and to some extent the nearby city of Moose Jaw, are now undergoing a mild resurgence as commuter satellites for Regina. Qu'Appelle, at one time intended to be the metropole for the original District of Assiniboia in the North-West Territories (as they then were), saw during the 1940s, 1950s and 1960s Regina cottagers pass through en route to the Qu'Appelle Valley; Highway 10, which bypassed Qu'Appelle, running directly from Balgonie to Fort Qu'Appelle off Highway Number 1, quickly ended this. Qu'Appelle has recently seen more interest taken in it as a place to live. Fort Qu'Appelle and its neighbouring resort villages on the Fishing Lakes remain a summer vacation venue of choice; Indian Head is far enough from Regina to have an autonomous identity but close enough that its charm and vitality attract commuters – it "has a range of professional services and tradespeople, financial institutions, and a number of retail establishments." It was the scene of outdoor filming sequences in the CBC television series "Little Mosque on the Prairie." White City and Emerald Park are quasi-suburbs of Regina, as have become Balgonie, Pense, Grand Coulee, Pilot Butte and Lumsden in the Qu'Appelle Valley, some 16 km (10 mi) to the north of Regina. Regina Beach — situated on Last Mountain Lake (known locally as Long Lake) and a 30-minute drive from Regina – has been a summer favourite of Reginans from its first establishment and since the 1970s has also become a commuter satellite; Rouleau (also known as the town of Dog River in the CTV television sitcom Corner Gas) is 45 km (28 mi) southwest of Regina and in the summer months used to "bustle with film crews."

== Culture ==
Regina has a substantial cultural life in music, theatre and dance, supported by the fine arts constituency at the University of Regina, which has faculties of music, theatre and arts. At various times this has attracted notable artistic talent: the Regina Five were artists at Regina College (the university's predecessor) who gained national fame in the 1950s. The long-established MacKenzie Art Gallery once occupied cramped quarters adjacent to Darke Hall on the University of Regina College Avenue Campus; since relocated to a large building at the southwest corner of the provincial government site, at Albert Street near 23rd Avenue. Donald M. Kendrick, Bob Boyer and Joe Fafard, now with significant international reputations, have been other artists from or once in Regina.

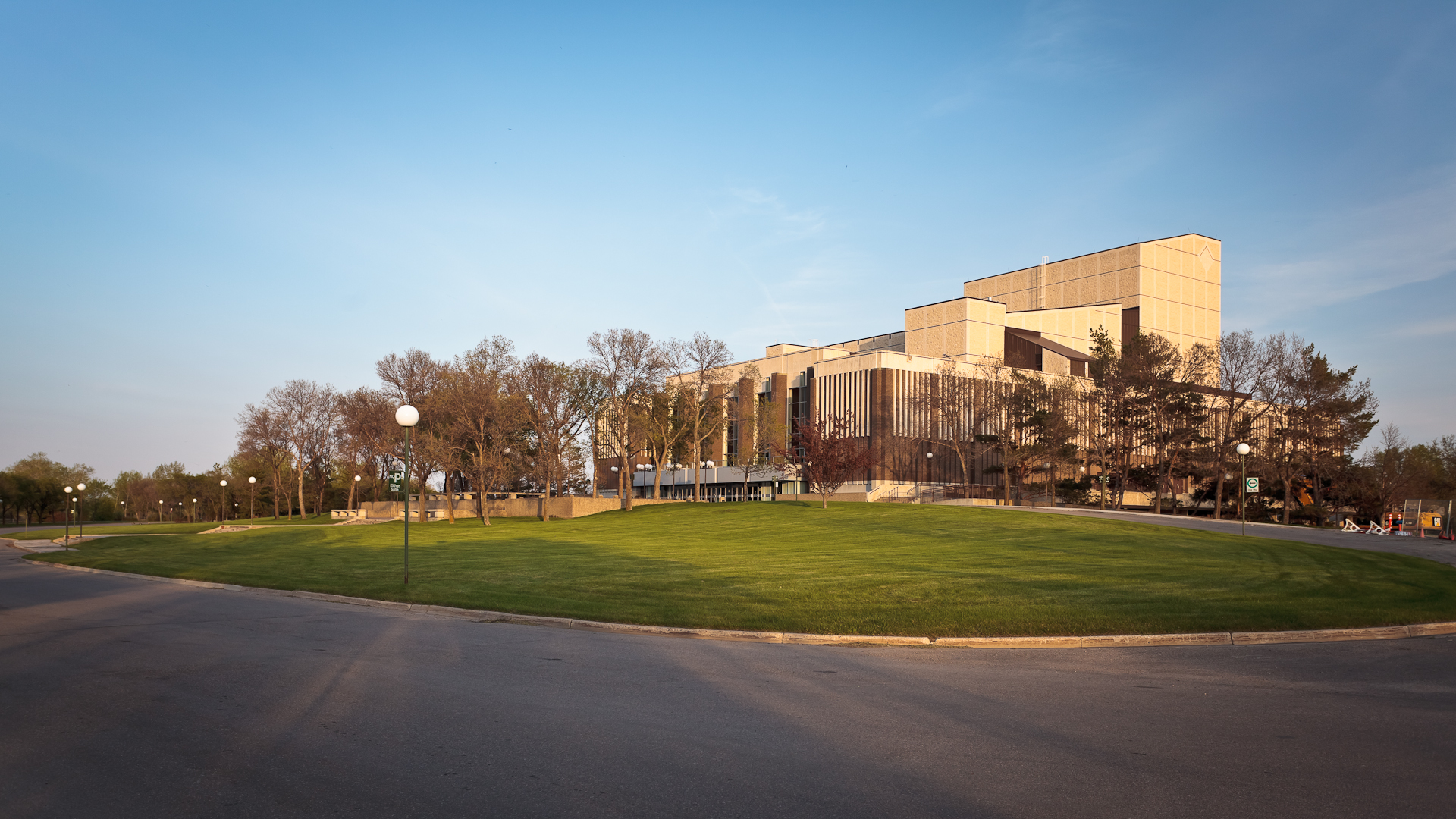
Conexus Arts Centre is a theatre complex and home to the Regina Symphony Orchestra, the oldest continuously performing orchestra in Canada.

Annual festivals in and near Regina through the year include the Regina International Film Festival; Cathedral Village Arts Festival; the Spring Celebration Powwow held by the First Nations University of Canada; the Craven Country Jamboree; the Regina Folk Festival; Queen City Pride; the Queer City Cinema film festival; the Regina Dragon Boat Festival; and Mosaic, mounted by the Regina Multicultural Council, which earned Heritage Canada's designation of 2004 "Cultural Capital of Canada" (in the over 125,000 population category). The annual Kiwanis Music Festival affords rising musical talents the opportunity to achieve nationwide recognition. The city's summer agricultural exhibition was originally established in 1884 as the Assiniboia Agricultural Association, then from the mid-1960s and up until 2009 as Buffalo Days then from that time until today, the Queen City Ex.

The Regina Symphony Orchestra, Canada's oldest continuously performing orchestra, performs in the Saskatchewan Centre of the Arts (now the Conexus Arts Centre). Concerts and recitals are performed both by local and visiting musicians in the Centre of the Arts and assorted other auditoriums including the University of Regina. The Regina Conservatory of Music operates in the former girls' residence wing of the Regina College building.

The Regina Little Theatre began in 1926, and performed in Regina College before building its own theatre in 1981. Regina lacked a large concert and live theatre venue for many years after the loss to fire of the Regina Theatre in 1938 and the demolition of the 1906 City Hall in 1964 at a time when preservation of heritage architecture was not yet a fashionable issue. But until the demolition of downtown cinemas which doubled as live theatres the lack was not urgent, and Darke Hall on the Regina College campus of the university provided a small concert and stage venue.

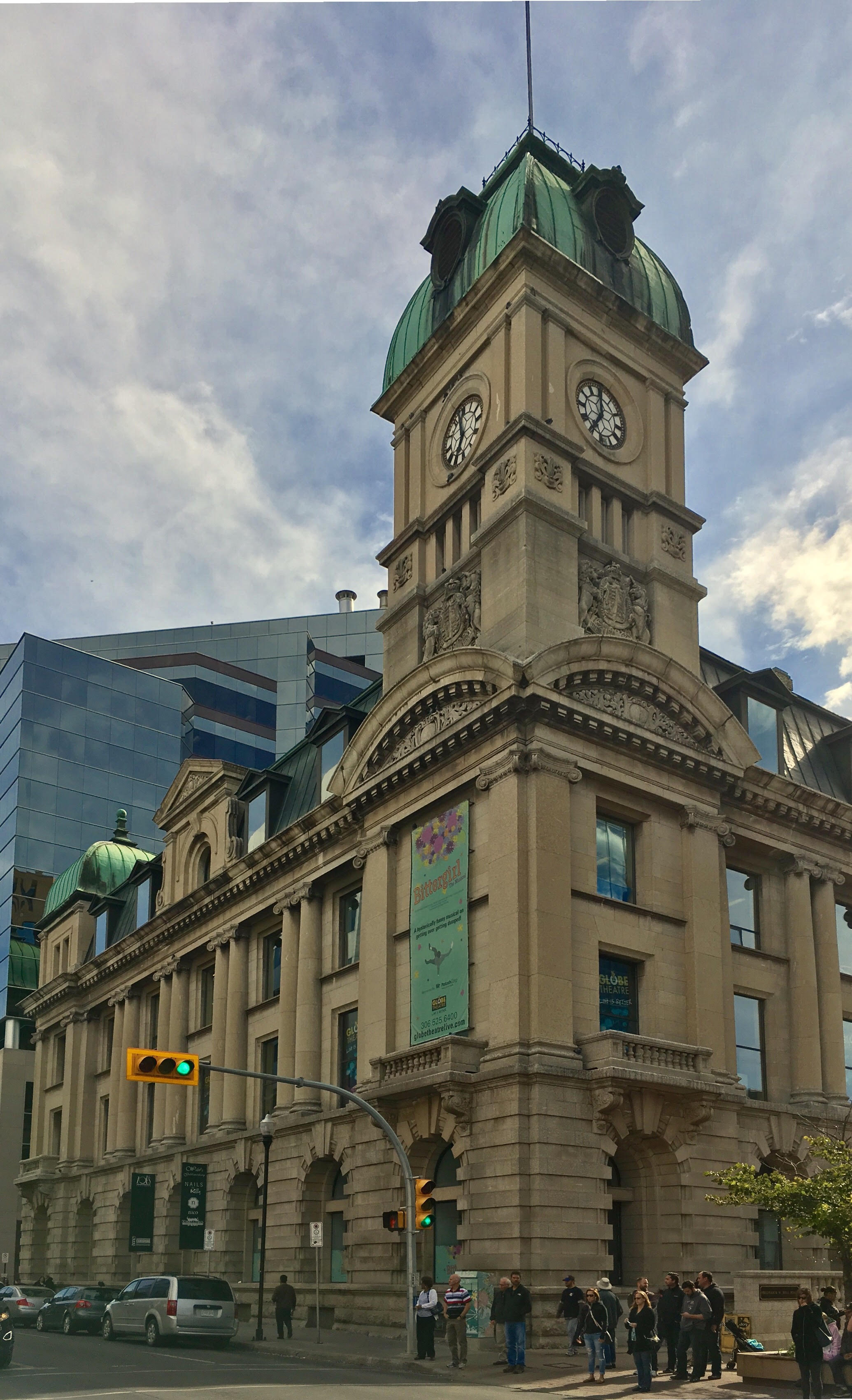
The Prince Edward Building is home to Globe Theatre, a professional theatre company.

This was remedied in 1970 with the construction of the Saskatchewan Centre of the Arts (now the Conexus Arts Centre) as a Canadian Centennial project, a theatre and concert hall complex overlooking Wascana Lake which is one of the most acoustically perfect concert venues in North America; it is home to the Regina Symphony Orchestra (Canada's oldest continuously performing orchestra), Opera Saskatchewan and New Dance Horizons, a contemporary dance company. The Royal Saskatchewan Museum (the present 1955 structure a Saskatchewan Golden Jubilee project) dates from 1906. The old Post Office at Scarth Street and 11th Avenue, temporarily used as a city hall after the demolition of the 1906 City Hall, is now home to the Globe Theatre, founded in 1966 as "Saskatchewan's first professional theatre since 1927." Holy Rosary Roman Catholic Cathedral and Knox-Metropolitan United Church have particularly impressive Casavant Frères pipe organs, maintain substantial musical establishments and are frequently the venues for choral concerts and organ recitals.

The Regina Public Library is a citywide library system with nine branches. Its facilities include the RPL Film theatre which plays non-mainstream cinema, the Dunlop Art Gallery, special literacy services and a prairie history collection. The MacKenzie Art Gallery in Wascana Centre and the Dunlop Art Gallery have permanent collections and sponsor travelling exhibitions. The Saskatchewan Archives and the Saskatchewan Genealogical Library also offer information for those interested in the people of Saskatchewan.

=== Parks and attractions ===
Regina has a substantial proportion of its overall area dedicated as parks and green spaces, with biking paths, cross-country skiing venues, and other recreational facilities throughout the city. Wascana Lake, the venue for summer boating activities, is regularly cleared of snow in winter for skating, and there are toboggan runs both in Wascana Centre and downstream on the banks of Wascana Creek. Victoria Park is in the central business district and numerous green spaces throughout the residential subdivisions and subdivisions in the north and west of the city contain large ornamental ponds to add interest to residential precincts such as Rochdale, Lakewood, Lakeridge, Spruce Meadows, and Windsor Park. Older school playing fields throughout the city have also been converted into landscaped parks.

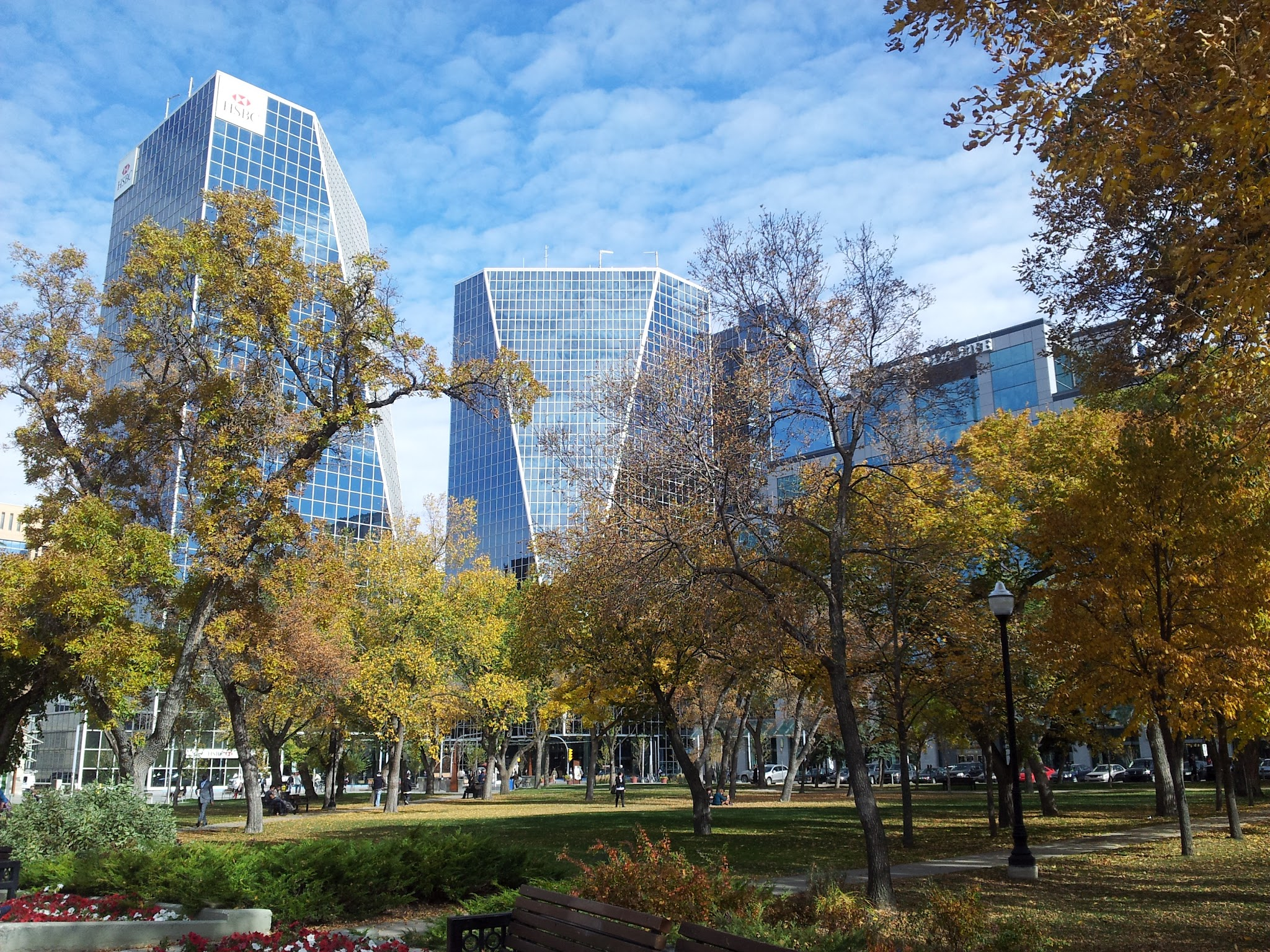
Victoria Park is a public park located in the centre of Regina's central business district.

The city operates five municipal golf courses, including two in King's Park northeast of the city. Kings Park Recreation facility is also home to ball diamonds, picnic grounds, and stock car racing. Within half an hour's drive are the summer cottage and camping country and winter ski resorts in the Qu'Appelle Valley with Last Mountain and Buffalo Pound Lakes and the four Fishing Lakes of Pasqua, Echo, Mission and Katepwa; slightly farther east are Round and Crooked Lakes, also in the Qu'Appelle Valley, and to the southeast the Kenosee Lake cottage country.

Wascana Centre is a 9.3 km^{2} (3.6 sq mi) park built around Wascana Lake and designed in 1961 by Minoru Yamasaki — the Seattle-born architect best known as the designer of the original World Trade Center in New York – in tandem with his starkly modernist design for the new Regina Campus of the University of Saskatchewan. Wascana Lake was created as a "stock watering hole" — for the CPR's rolling stock, that is – in 1883 when a dam and bridge were constructed 1½ blocks to the west of the present Albert Street Bridge. A new dam and bridge were built in 1908, and Wascana Lake was used as a domestic water source, to cool the city's power plant and, in due course, for the new provincial legislative building.

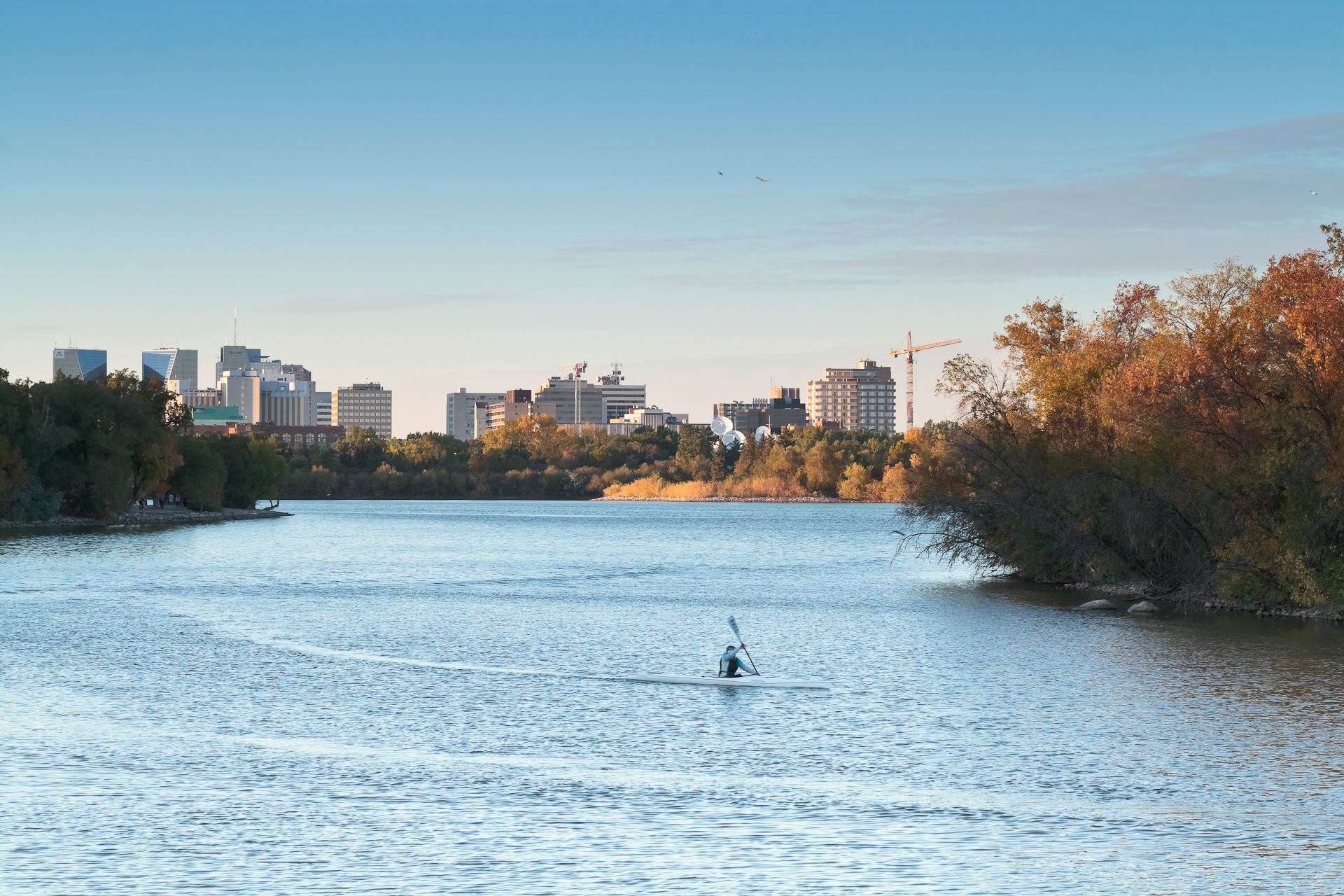
Wascana Centre is a 9.3 km^{2} (3.6 sq mi) provincially operated park built around Wascana Lake.

By the 1920s, with Boggy Creek as a source of domestic water and wells into the aquifer under Regina, Wascana Lake had ceased to have a utilitarian purpose and had become a primarily recreational facility, with bathing and boating its principal uses. It was drained in the 1930s as part of a government relief project; 2,100 men widened and dredged the lake bed and created two islands using only hand tools and horse-drawn wagons.

During the fall and winter of 2003–2004, Wascana Lake was again drained and dredged to deepen it while adding a new island, a promenade area beside Albert Street Bridge, water fountains, and a waterfall to help aerate the lake.

Downstream from Wascana Lake, Wascana Creek continues to provide a lush parkland on its increasingly intensively developed perimeter; in the northwest quadrant of the city Wascana Creek has a second weir with a smaller reservoir in A.E. Wilson Park.

==== Visitor attractions ====
Regina is a travel destination for residents of southeastern Saskatchewan and the immediately adjacent regions of the neighbouring US states of North Dakota and Montana, and an intermediate stopping point for travellers on the Trans-Canada Highway. Tourism is promoted by Tourism Regina. Attractions for visitors in Regina include:

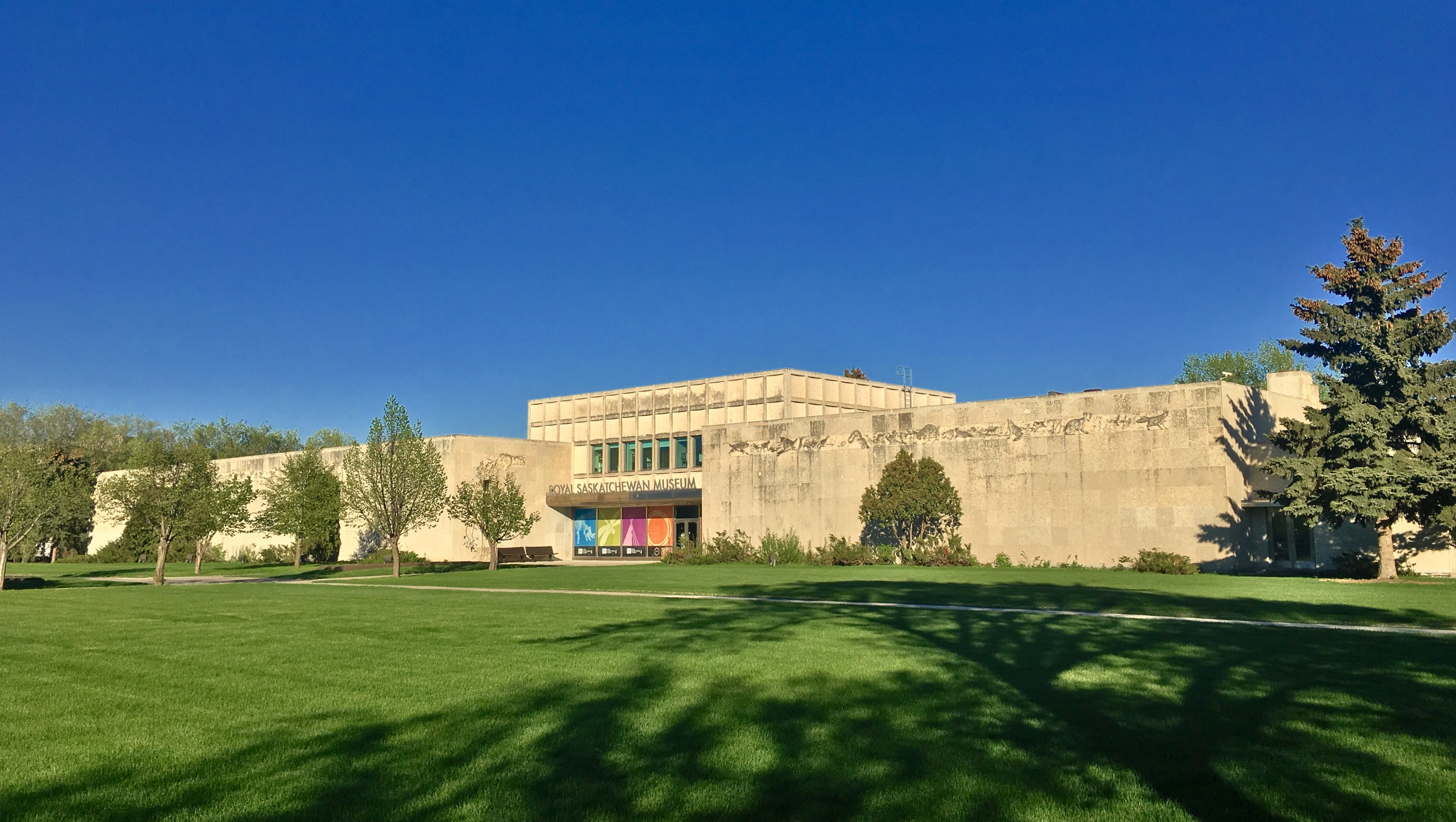
The Royal Saskatchewan Museum is a provincial museum and attraction located in Regina.

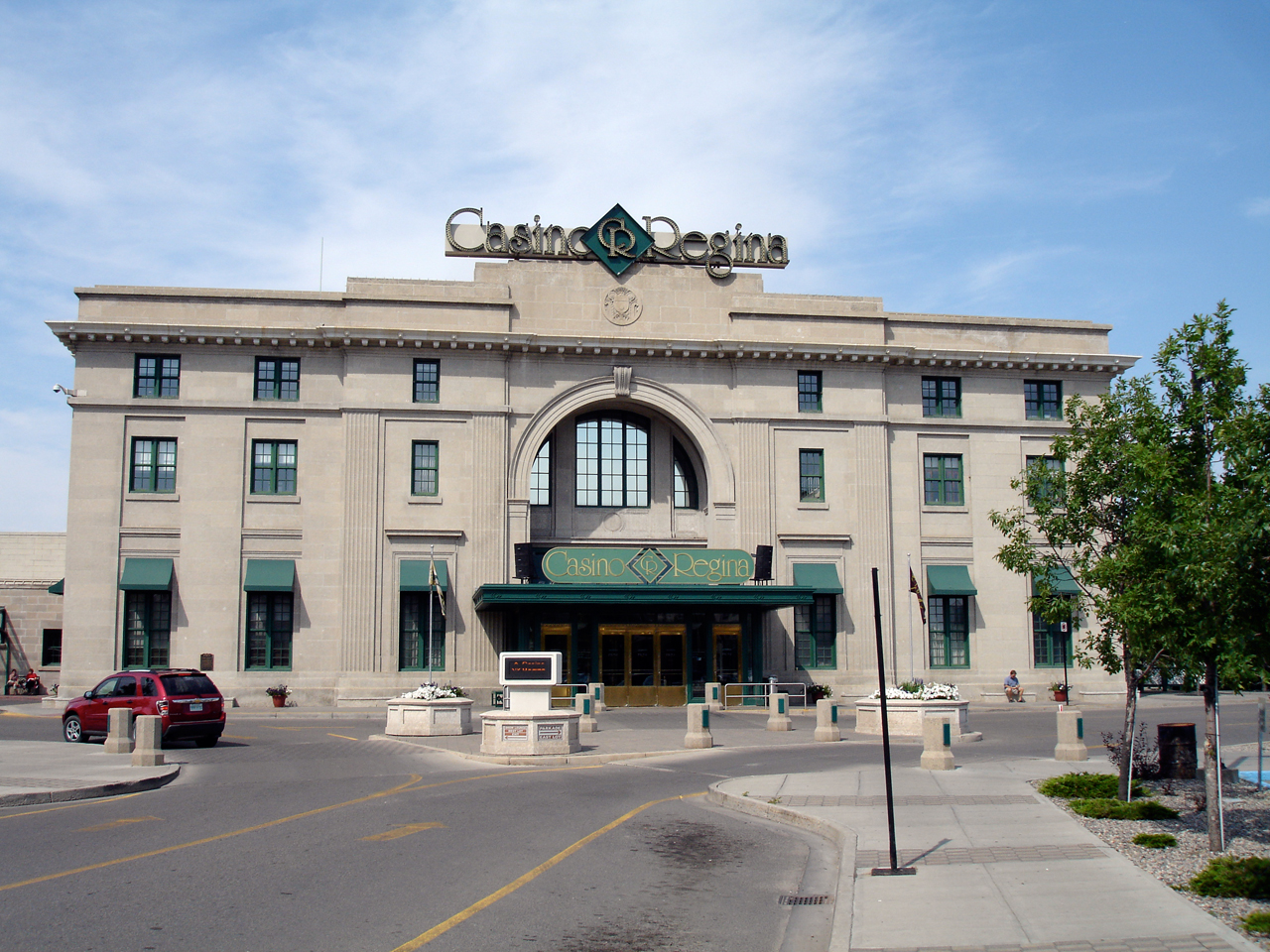
Located within the former Canadian Pacific Railway station, Casino Regina is a casino operated by Sask Gaming.

- Wascana Centre, a 9.3 km^{2} (3.6 sq mi) park around Wascana Lake bringing together lands containing government, recreational, cultural, educational and environmental buildings and facilities.
- Victoria Park in downtown Regina offers the Regina Folk Festival and other outdoor festivities including the nearby Farmers Market in the summertime.
- the Royal Saskatchewan Museum (a museum of natural history);
- the Saskatchewan Science Centre, housed in the 1914 Powerhouse on east Wascana Lake;
- the Norman Mackenzie Art Gallery and numerous smaller galleries and museums;
- the Roman Catholic cathedral on 13th Avenue in the West End, but also perhaps to a somewhat lesser extent the Anglican cathedral in downtown Regina and the Romanian Orthodox cathedral on Victoria Avenue in the East End;
- the Hotel Saskatchewan first opened by the CPR has accommodated royalty on numerous occasions and still maintains the ambiance of a bygone time
- Knox-Metropolitan United Church on Victoria Park in downtown Regina: the surviving downtown congregation of the United Church (Metropolitan Methodist and the now demolished or closed Knox, Carmichael and St Andrew's United Churches, previously Presbyterian, were its antecedents or now-defunct daughter congregations) with the largest pipe organ in Regina;
- the Royal Canadian Mounted Police (RCMP) national training centre and the museum;
- Government House, where regular tours are available, conducted by guides in "period" costume and the Lieutenant-Governor holds an annual levée on New Year's Day;
- Casino Regina, in the old Union Station;
- the Globe Theatre in the Old Post Office building on the Scarth Street Mall;
- events held at Mosaic Stadium sports stadium and the Saskatchewan Centre of the Arts;
- REAL District, formerly Evraz Place (formerly Ipsco Place, previously Regina Exhibition Park), the venue for the annual Queen City Ex (formerly Buffalo Days Exhibition) summer agricultural fair every August; and
- the Canadian Western Agribition, a winter agricultural show and marketplace every November.

The former large-scale Children's Day Parade and Travellers' Day Parade during Fair Week in the summer, which were substantially supported by the Masons and Shriners, has become the fair parade as such service clubs have lost vitality; the Regina Exhibition's travelling midway divides its time among other western Canadian and US cities. A Santa Claus parade is now mounted during the lead-up to Christmas.

=== Sports ===
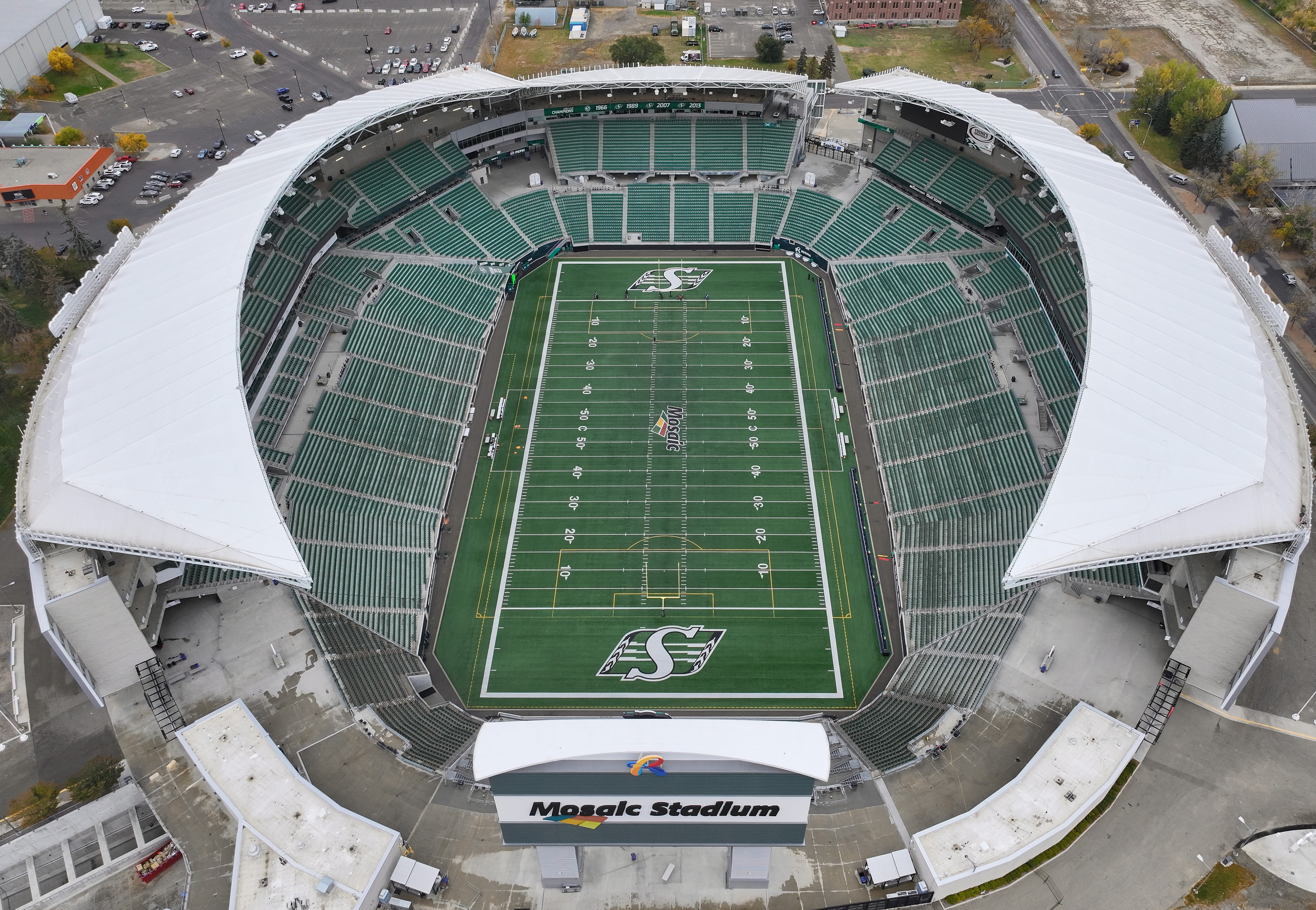
Located at Evraz Place, Mosaic Stadium is an open-air stadium that is the home arena for the CFL's Saskatchewan Roughriders.

The Saskatchewan Roughriders of the Canadian Football League play their home games at Mosaic Stadium in Regina. Formed in 1910 as the Regina Rugby Club and renamed the Regina Roughriders in 1924 and the Saskatchewan Roughriders in 1946, the "Riders" are a community-owned team with a loyal fan base; out-of-town season ticket holders often travel 300–400 km (190–250 mi) or more to attend home games. The team has won the Grey Cup on five occasions, in 1966, 1989, 2007, 2013, and 2025. Regina is also home to a successful women's football team, the Regina Riot of the Western Women's Canadian Football League. The Riot have won three league championships, in 2015, 2017, and 2018.

Other sports teams in Regina include the four-time Memorial Cup champion Regina Pats of the Western Hockey League, the Regina Thunder of the Canadian Junior Football League, the Prairie Fire of the Rugby Canada Super League, the Regina Red Sox of the Western Canadian Baseball League, and the University of Regina's Regina Cougars/Regina Rams of U Sports. Regina is also where all Water Polo players from Saskatchewan centralize, Regina's team being Water Polo Armada.

Regina's curling teams have distinguished the city for many decades. Richardson Crescent commemorates the Richardson curling team of the 1950s. In recent years Olympic Gold medal winner Sandra Schmirler and her rink occasioned vast civic pride; the Sandra Schmirler Leisure Centre in east Regina commemorates her. Regina held the 1973, 1983, and 2011 World Men's Curling Championship. The city has two curling clubs: The Caledonian and the Highland.

North-east of the city lies Kings Park Speedway, a ⅓-mile paved oval used for stock car racing since the late 1960s. Regina hosted the Western Canada Summer Games in 1975, and again in 1987, as well as being the host city for the 2005 Canada Summer Games. Regina also held the 2014 North American Indigenous Games.

Major sports teams
Club	Sport	League	Venue	Established	Championships
Saskatchewan Roughriders	Canadian football	CFL	Mosaic Stadium	1910	5
Regina Pats	Ice hockey	WHL	Brandt Centre	1917	2

== Demographics ==
Historical populations
Year	Pop.	±%
1901	2,249	—
1906	6,169	+174.3%
1911	30,213	+389.8%
1916	26,127	−13.5%
1921	34,432	+31.8%
1926	37,329	+8.4%
1931	53,209	+42.5%
1936	53,354	+0.3%
1941	57,389	+7.6%
1946	60,246	+5.0%
1951	71,319	+18.4%
1956	89,755	+25.9%
1961	112,141	+24.9%
1966	131,127	+16.9%
1971	139,469	+6.4%
1976	149,593	+7.3%
1981	162,613	+8.7%
1986	175,064	+7.7%
1991	179,178	+2.3%
1996	180,404	+0.7%
2001	178,225	−1.2%
2006	179,246	+0.6%
2011	193,100	+7.7%
2016	215,106	+11.4%
2021	226,404	+5.3%
Sources: Government of Canada

In the 2021 Census of Population conducted by Statistics Canada, Regina had a population of 226,404 living in 92,129 of its 99,134 total private dwellings, a change of 5.3% from its 2016 population of 215,106. With a land area of 178.81 km^{2} (69.04 sq mi), it had a population density of 1,266.2/km^{2} (3,279.4/sq mi) in 2021.

At the census metropolitan area (CMA) level in the 2021 census, the Regina CMA had a population of 249,217 living in 100,211 of its 108,120 total private dwellings, a change of 5.3% from its 2016 population of 236,695. With a land area of 4,323.66 km^{2} (1,669.37 sq mi), it had a population density of 57.6/km^{2} (149.3/sq mi) in 2021.

The 2021 census reported that immigrants (individuals born outside Canada) comprise 45,210 persons or 20.3% of the total population of Regina. Of the total immigrant population, the top countries of origin were Philippines (9,840 persons or 21.8%), India (7,385 persons or 16.3%), China (2,905 persons or 6.4%), Pakistan (2,640 persons or 5.8%), Nigeria (2,235 persons or 4.9%), Vietnam (1,410 persons or 3.1%), United Kingdom (1,380 persons or 3.1%), Bangladesh (1,240 persons or 2.7%), United States of America (1,155 persons or 2.6%), and Ukraine (885 persons or 2.0%).

=== Ethnicity ===
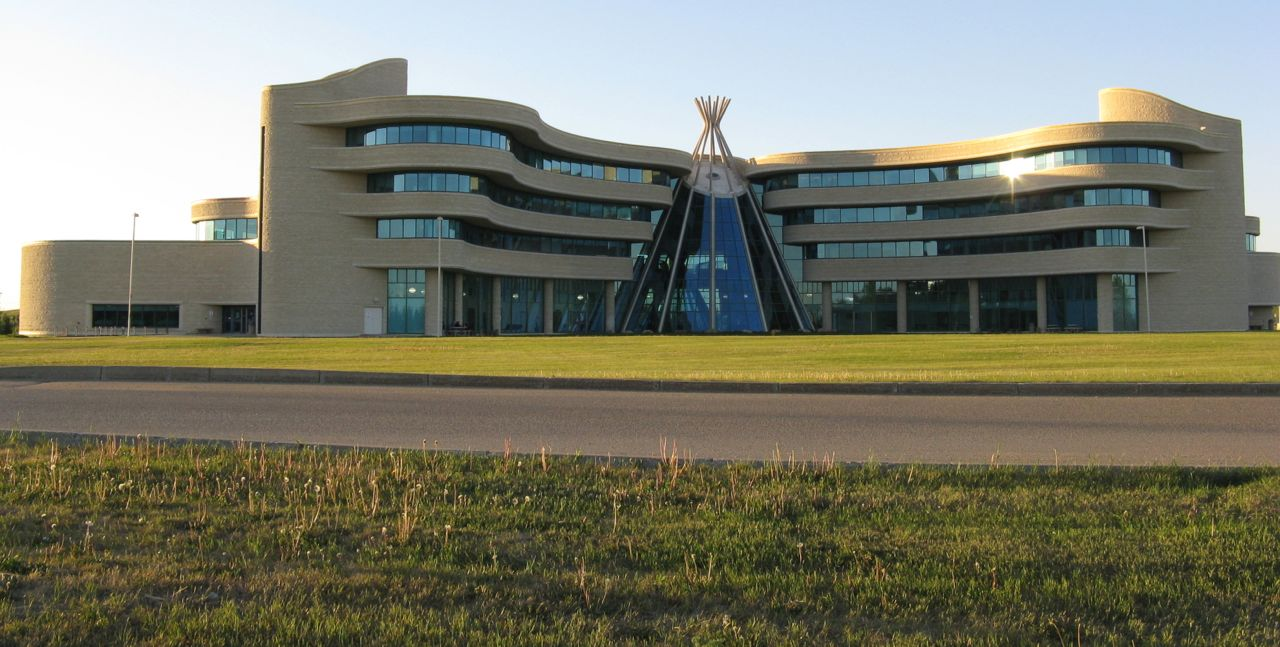
First Nations University of Canada is a post-secondary institution that provides First Nations-centred academic programs. In the 2021 census, 10.4 percent of all residents in Regina were Indigenous.

In absolute numbers of Aboriginal population, Regina ranked seventh among CMAs in Canada with an "Aboriginal-identity population of 15,685 (8.3% of the total city population), of which 9,200 were First Nations, 5,990 Métis, and 495 other Aboriginal."

Panethnic groups in the City of Regina (2001−2021)
Panethnic group	2021		2016		2011		2006		2001	
Panethnic group	Pop.	%	Pop.	%	Pop.	%	Pop.	%	Pop.	%
European (Note: Statistic includes all persons that did not make up part of a visible minority or an indigenous identity.)	142,440	63.85%	150,110	70.88%	149,225	78.65%	147,955	83.63%	150,515	85.71%
Indigenous	23,290	10.44%	20,925	9.88%	18,750	9.88%	16,535	9.35%	15,295	8.71%
South Asian	19,200	8.61%	12,330	5.82%	4,885	2.57%	1,945	1.1%	1,665	0.95%
Southeast Asian (Note: Statistic includes total responses of "Filipino" and "Southeast Asian" under visible minority section on census.)	15,525	6.96%	11,060	5.22%	6,635	3.5%	2,445	1.38%	2,175	1.24%
African	9,820	4.4%	6,330	2.99%	3,065	1.62%	2,125	1.2%	1,555	0.89%
East Asian (Note: Statistic includes total responses of "Chinese", "Korean", and "Japanese" under visible minority section on census.)	6,760	3.03%	6,430	3.04%	4,185	2.21%	3,825	2.16%	2,750	1.57%
Middle Eastern (Note: Statistic includes total responses of "West Asian" and "Arab" under visible minority section on census.)	2,920	1.31%	2,275	1.07%	1,060	0.56%	700	0.4%	475	0.27%
Latin American	1,410	0.63%	1,180	0.56%	1,270	0.67%	955	0.54%	770	0.44%
Other/Multiracial (Note: Statistic includes total responses of "Visible minority, n.i.e." and "Multiple visible minorities" under visible minority section on census.)	1,700	0.76%	1,140	0.54%	670	0.35%	425	0.24%	400	0.23%
Total responses	223,070	98.53%	211,780	98.45%	189,740	98.26%	176,910	98.7%	175,605	98.53%
Total population	226,404	100%	215,106	100%	193,100	100%	179,246	100%	178,225	100%
Note: Totals greater than 100% due to multiple origin responses

=== Religion ===
According to the 2021 census, religious groups in Regina included:

- Christianity (117,905 persons or 52.9%)
- Irreligion (79,020 persons or 35.4%)
- Islam (10,360 persons or 4.6%)
- Hinduism (6,565 persons or 2.9%)
- Sikhism (4,305 persons or 1.9%)
- Buddhism (1,790 persons or 0.8%)
- Indigenous Spirituality (1,210 persons or 0.5%)
- Judaism (365 persons or 0.2%)
- Other (1,555 persons or 0.7%)

According to the 2011 Census, 67.9% of the population identify as Christian, with Catholics (30.4%) making up the largest denomination, followed by United Church (11.3%), Lutheran (7.2%), and other denominations. Others identify as Muslim (1.9%), Buddhist (0.9%), Hindu (0.8%), Sikh (0.5%), with Traditional (Aboriginal) Spirituality (0.5%), and with other religions. 27.1% of the population report no religious affiliation.

== Economy ==
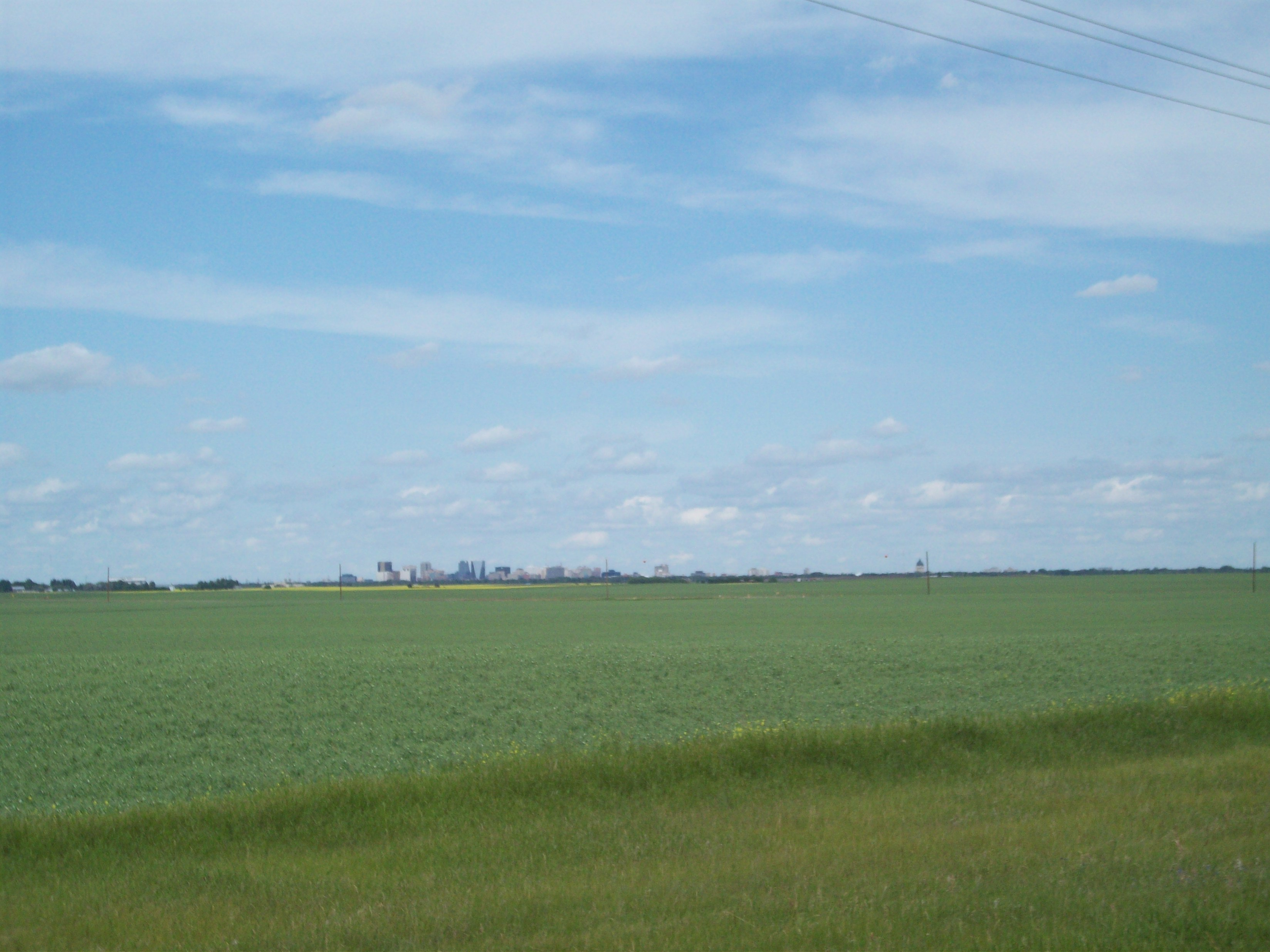
View of Regina from a distance on Saskatchewan Highway 1. The city is situated on a broad, flat, and largely waterless and treeless plain.

Regina, as the capital of Saskatchewan, is the headquarters of a number of Saskatchewan Government organizations, including the Saskatchewan Legislative Building, provincial government ministries, and agencies, boards, and commissions. Also, Crown Investments Corporation and a number of the Crown Corporations it holds, including SaskEnergy, Sask Gaming, SGI, SaskPower, and SaskTel, are based in Regina. The Innovation Place Research Park immediately adjacent to the University of Regina campus hosts several science and technology companies which conduct research activities in conjunction with University departments.

Oil and natural gas, potash, kaolin, sodium sulphite and bentonite contribute a great part of Regina and area's economy. The completion of the train link between eastern Canada and the then-District of Assiniboia in 1885, the development of the high-yielding and early-maturing Marquis strain of wheat and the opening of new grain markets in the United Kingdom established the first impetus for economic development and substantial population settlement. The farm and agricultural component is still a significant part of the economy – the Saskatchewan Wheat Pool (now Viterra Inc.,), "the world's largest grain-handling co-operative" has its headquarters in Regina — but it is no longer the major driver; provincially it has slipped to eighth overall, well behind the natural resources sectors.

Modern transport has obviated the development of a significant manufacturing sector and local petroleum refining facilities: the General Motors assembly plant north on Winnipeg Street, built in 1927 – when Saskatchewan's agricultural economy was booming and briefly made it the third province of Canada after Ontario and Quebec in both population (at just under one million people, roughly the same population as today) and GDP – ceased production during the depression of the 1930s. It was resumed by the federal crown during World War II and housed Regina Wartime Industries Ltd., where 1,000 people were engaged in armaments manufacture. It was not returned to private automotive manufacture after the war and became derelict.

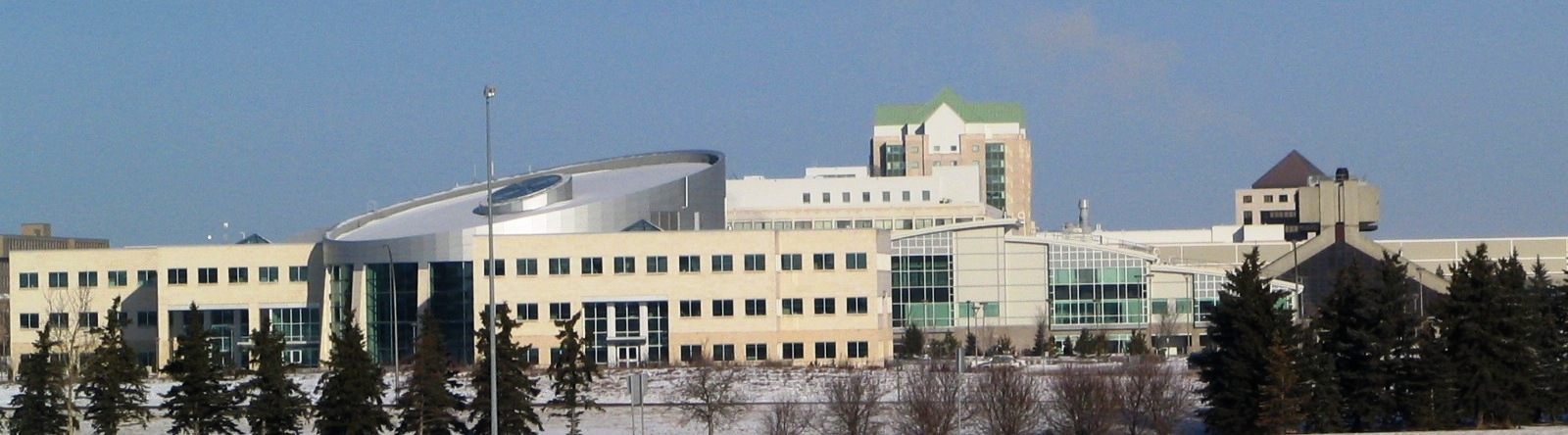
Regina is home to one of Saskatchewan's Innovation Place Research Parks, a network of science parks that is funded primarily by the provincial government.

EVRAZ is a leading world producer of steel plate and pipe. Its Regina operations were founded as Prairie Pipe Manufacturing Company Ltd. on 13 July 1956, a steel pipe plant designed to build small-diameter pipe to serve the Saskatchewan market. The government-owned Saskatchewan Power Corporation, in the process of expanding Saskatchewan's commercial and residential delivery of natural gas, agreed to purchase its tubular requirements from Prairie Pipe. To supply Prairie Pipe with its own steel supply, a new enterprise named Interprovincial Steel Corporation was founded in 1957, and built a small steel mill on property adjacent to Prairie Pipe. In 1959, Prairie Pipe purchased all the assets of Interprovincial Steel Corporation because the latter ran into financial difficulties. As a result of this merger, the company became known as Interprovincial Steel and Pipe Corporation, or IPSCO Inc. for short. As of July 2007, it was a wholly owned subsidiary of the Swedish steel company SSAB. On 12 June 2008, Evraz completed its acquisition of IPSCO Inc. from SSAB for approximately US$2.9 billion.

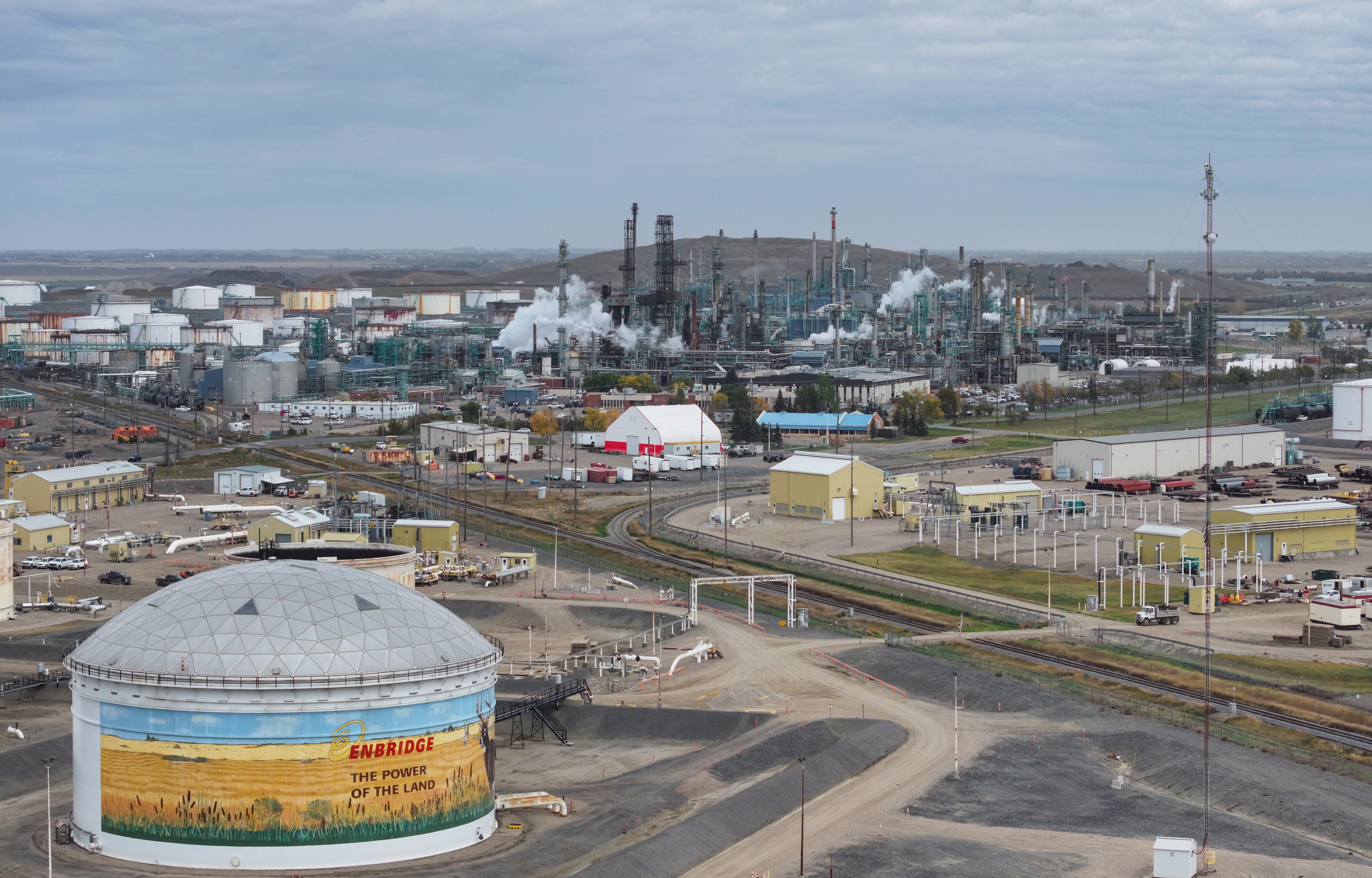
A Enbridge pipeline delivers crude oil to the Co-op Refinery Complex

Regina has had the presence of oil refineries in the city. The Co-op Refinery Complex maintains an 103,000 bbl/d (16,400 m^{3}/d) refinery and, together with the Province, an upgrading operation for heavy crude oil. Imperial Oil (the Canadian subsidiary of Standard Oil, now ExxonMobil), maintained a refinery on Winnipeg Street in Regina for many years. This refinery shut down in 1975.

In the 1990s, a couple of organizations relocated their headquarters to Regina. Farm Credit Canada, a Federal Government Crown Corporation, relocated its headquarters to Regina from Ottawa in 1992. Crown Life, a significant Canadian and international insurance company, transferred its national head office from Toronto to Regina in 1993 but was acquired by Canada Life in 1998 and the corporate head office returned to Toronto, though with assurances that the company would retain a strong presence in Regina.

On 19 May 2009 it was announced that Viterra (formerly Saskatchewan Wheat Pool, becoming Viterra after acquisition of Agricore United), the largest grain handler in Canada, would acquire ABB Grain of Adelaide, South Australia in September 2009. The Head Office would be relocated to Regina, with the worldwide malting headquarters remaining in Adelaide. The two companies together are responsible for 37 percent of the world's exports of wheat, canola and barley.

The Mosaic Company has an office in Regina. This office serves as the headquarters for the company's Potash Business Unit.

== Education ==
=== Primary and secondary schooling ===
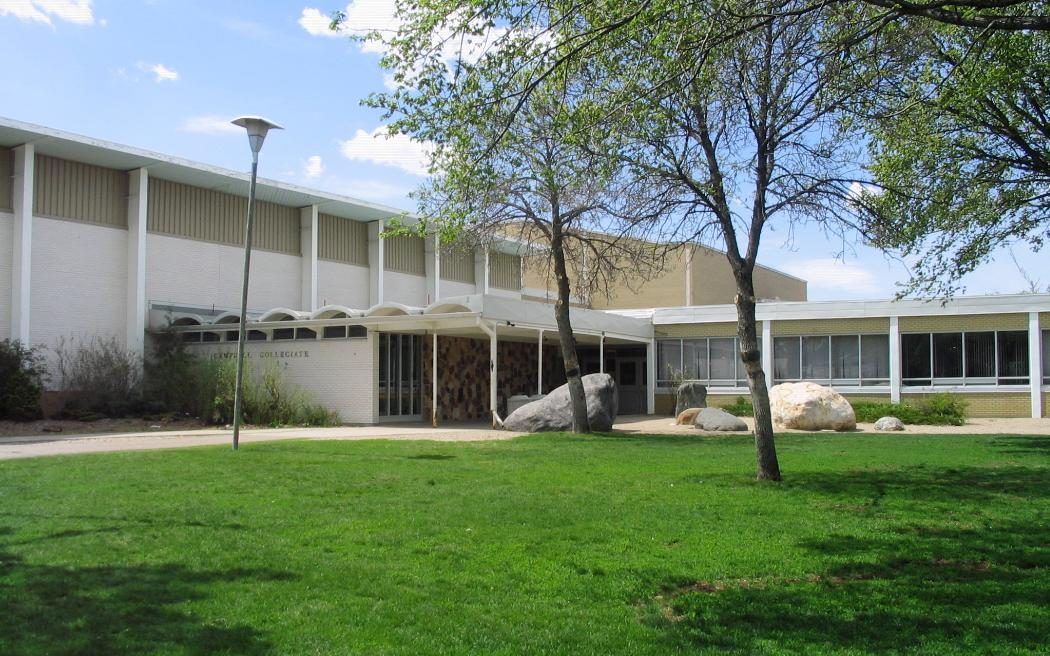
Campbell Collegiate is one of eight secondary schools operated by the secular English-language Regina Board of Education.

The Regina Public School Board currently operates 45 elementary schools and 9 high schools with approximately 21,000 students enrolled throughout the city. The publicly funded Regina Catholic Schools Separate School Board operates 25 elementary schools and 4 high schools, and has a current enrollment of approximately 10,000 students. Public and separate schools are amply equipped with state-of-the-art science labs, gymnasia, drama and arts facilities: already by the 1960s, Regina high schools had television studios, swimming pools, ice rinks and drama facilities. Francophone public schools are operated by the Conseil des écoles fransaskoises.

A small number of parents choose to opt out of the public and separate school systems for home-schooling under the guidance of the Regina Public School Board. Luther College (affiliated with the Evangelical Lutheran Church in Canada) is a historical, independent high school; the Regina Huda School offers Islamic education; Harvest City Christian Academy is a private school (occupying the former Sister McGuigan High School site); and the Regina Christian School (in the former Campion College premises) operates as an Associate school of the Regina Public School Division. Historically there were eminent private schools long since closed: Regina College, now the University of Regina but originally a private high school of the Methodist Church of Canada (since 1925 the United Church); the Anglican St Chad's School; the Roman Catholic Campion College, Sacred Heart Academy and Marian High School.

=== University of Regina ===
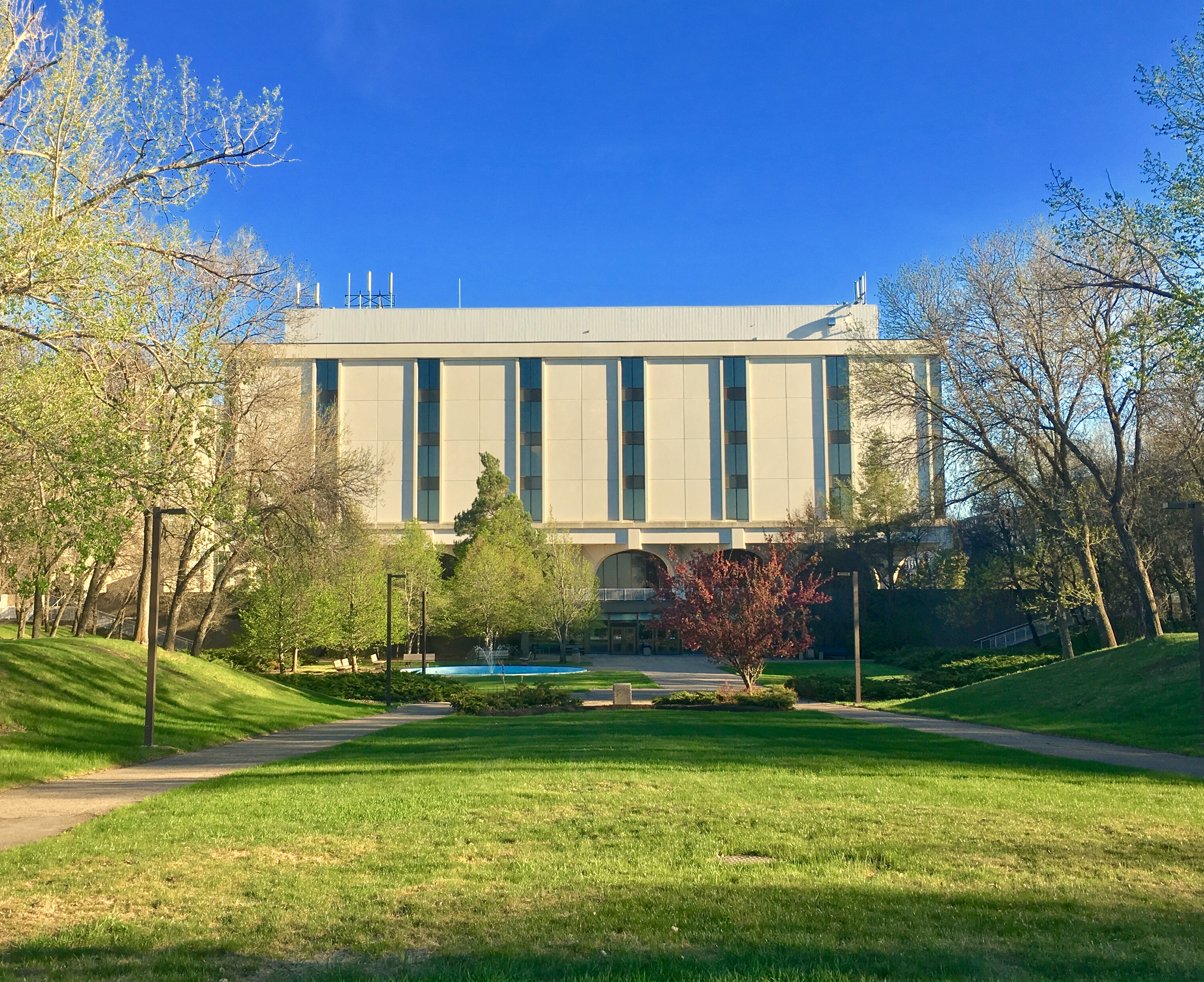
John Archer Library at the University of Regina. Established in 1911, the institution is the oldest university located in the city.

In the years prior to the establishment of the University of Saskatchewan, there was continued debate as to which Saskatchewan city would be awarded the provincial university: ultimately Saskatoon won out over Regina and in immediate reaction the Methodist Church of Canada established Regina College in 1911. Regina College was initially a denominational high school and junior college affiliated with the University of Saskatchewan – the later-established Campion and Luther Colleges, operated by the Roman Catholic Jesuit Order and Lutheran Church respectively, operated on the same basis. The Church of England concurrently established St Chad's College, an Anglican theological training facility, and the Qu'Appelle Diocesan School on the Anglican diocesan property immediately to the east of Regina College on College Avenue. All were quasi-tertiary institutions.

Ultimately, the financially hard-pressed United Church of Canada (the successor to the Methodist Church), which in any case had ideological difficulties with the concept of fee-paying private schooling given its longstanding espousal of universal free education from the time of its early father Egerton Ryerson, could no longer maintain Regina College during the Great Depression of the 1930s, and Regina College was disaffiliated from the Church and surrendered to the University of Saskatchewan; it became the Regina Campus of the University of Saskatchewan in 1961. After a protracted contretemps over the siting of several faculties in Saskatoon which had been promised to the Regina campus, Regina Campus sought and obtained a separate charter as the University of Regina in 1974.

Campion College and Luther College now have federated college status in the University of Regina, as does the First Nations University of Canada; The United Church's Regina College has entirely consolidated with the University of Saskatchewan and identified with St Andrew's College there: despite the considerable historical involvement by the Methodist, Presbyterian and Anglican churches in antecedent institutions of the University of Regina. The Regina Research Park is located immediately adjacent to the main campus and many of its initiatives in information technology, petroleum and environmental sciences are conducted in conjunction with university departments. A member in the research park is Canada's Petroleum Technology Research facility, a world leader in oil recovery and geological storage of CO_{2}.

=== Saskatchewan Polytechnic ===
The Regina campus of this province-wide polytechnic institute is adjacent to the University of Regina. It occupies the former Plains Health Centre, previously a third hospital in Regina which in the course of rationalizing health services in Saskatchewan was in due course closed. It offers certificates, diplomas, and applied degrees in trade, skilled labour, and professional fields.

=== RCMP Academy, Depot Division ===
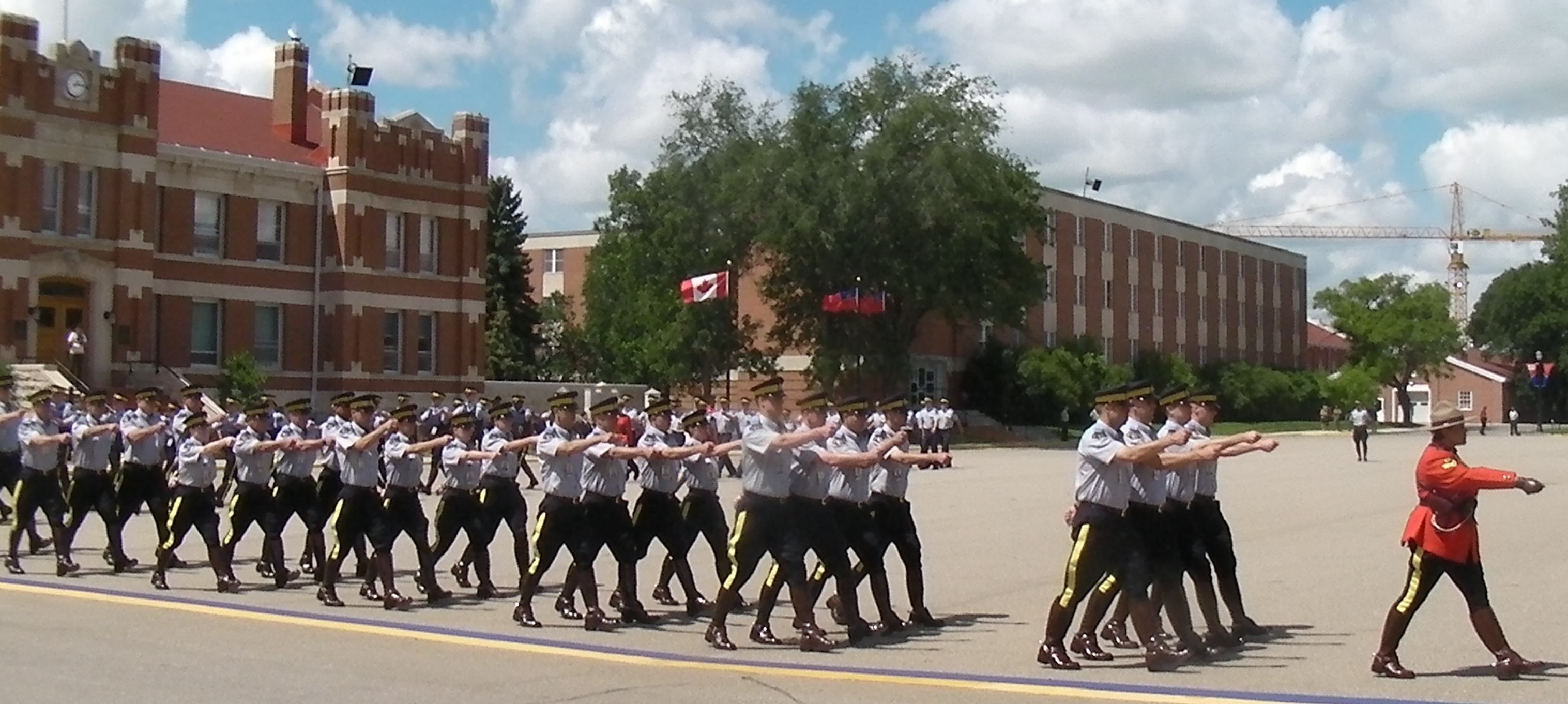
RCMP cadets at the RCMP Academy's Depot Division. The Depot has been providing RCMP training since its establishment in 1885.

The Royal Canadian Mounted Police Academy, "Depot" Division, is on the western perimeter of the city. As capital of the North-West Territories, Regina was the headquarters of the Royal North-West Mounted Police (the RCMP's predecessor) before "the Force" became a national body with its headquarters in Ottawa in 1920. The city takes great pride in this national institution which is a major visitor attraction and a continuing link with Regina's past as the headquarters of the Force, together with longstanding substantial enrollment by trainees from across Canada, obtaining entertainment and recreation citywide. It offers sunset ceremonies and parade in the summertime. The national RCMP music and "Depot" Division chapel (the oldest building still standing in the city) are major visitor attractions in Regina. The first phase of a RCMP Heritage Centre successor to the longstanding museum opened in May 2007.

== Infrastructure ==
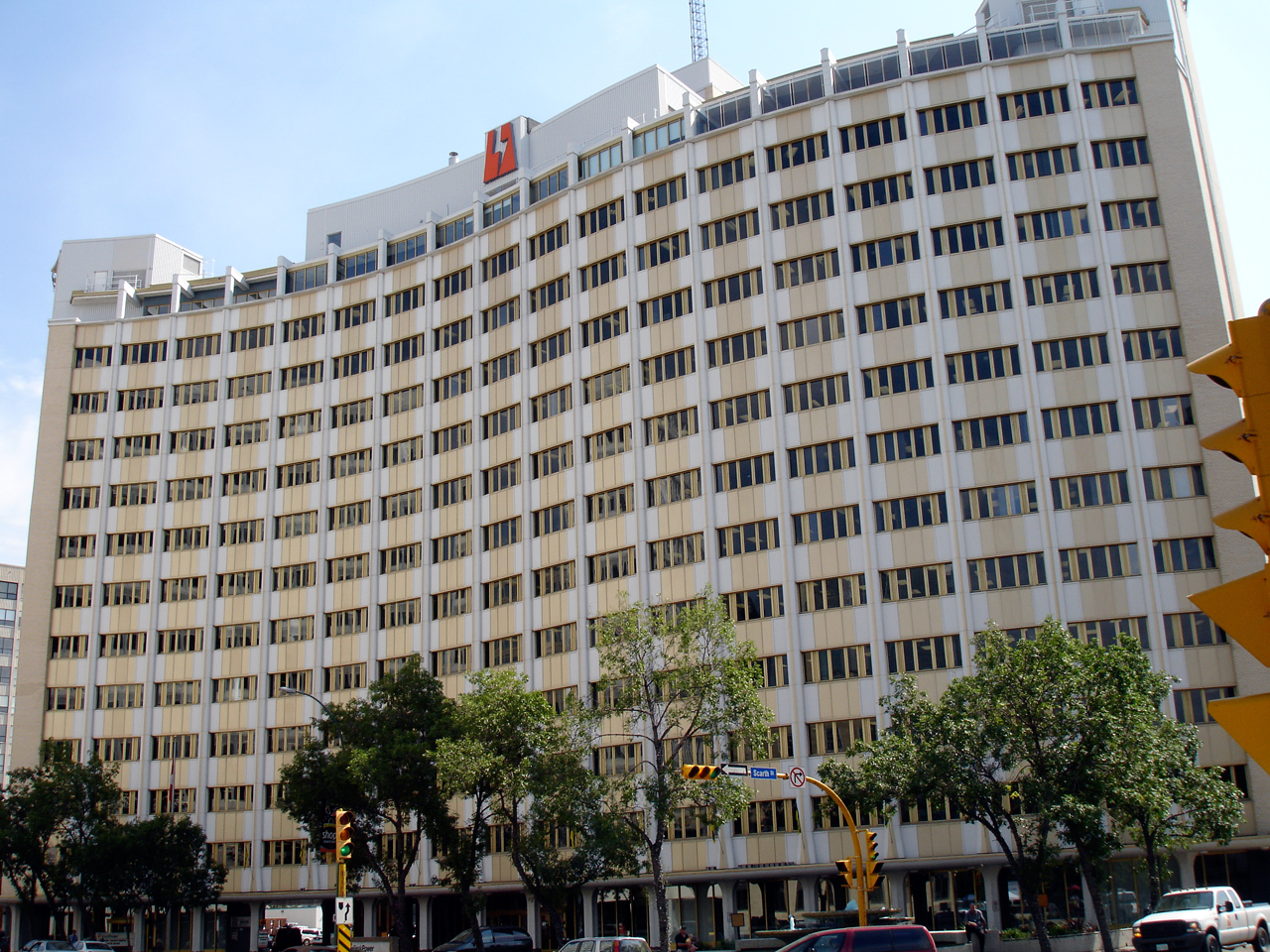
Headquarters for SaskPower. The provincial Crown corporation provides power for Regina, as well as maintains the provincial power grid.

Domestic water was originally obtained from Wascana Lake and later the Boggy Creek reservoir north of the city and supplemented by wells, however by the 1940s this was proving inadequate to meet the city's water supply needs. Today, drinking water is supplied from Buffalo Pound Lake in the Qu'Appelle Valley, an artificial reservoir on the Qu'Appelle River, since 1967 with water diverted into it from Lake Diefenbaker behind the Gardiner Dam on the South Saskatchewan River. Electricity is provided by SaskPower, a provincial Crown corporation which maintains a province-wide grid with power generated from coal-fired base load, natural gas-fired, hydroelectric and wind power facilities.

Medical services are provided through three city hospitals, Regina General, Pasqua (formerly Grey Nuns), and Wascana Rehabilitation Centre and by private medical practitioners, who, like hospitals, remit their bills to the public universal medical insurer, the Saskatchewan Medicare system.

=== Policing ===
==== Crime ====
Despite having fallen in recent years, Regina's crime rate remains among the highest in Canada. Regina's overall police-reported crime rate was second highest in the country in 2012. Also, the relative severity of crimes in Regina is quite high and the city continues to top the national Crime Severity Index. Regina's crime rate declined 10% from 2011 to 2012. Regina also has one of the highest rates of intravenous drug use in Canada.

Crime in Regina, SK by Neighbourhood (2013)
Neighbourhood	Population (2011)	Robberies	Rate	Homicides	Rate	Sexual Assaults	Rate	Burglaries (break and enter)	Rate
North Central	10150	77	758.6	3	29.6	21	206.9	255	2512.3
Centre Square/Market Square	3880	24	618.6	1	25.8	6	154.6	32	824.7
Eastview/Warehouse	1885	5	265.3	2	106.1	4	212.2	122	6472.1
Core Group (Heritage Park, Downtown)	6145	16	260.4	1	16.3	12	195.3	63	1025.2
Cathedral	6505	15	230.6	1	15.4	7	107.6	62	953.1
Al Ritchie	7810	9	115.2	0	0	8	102.4	77	985.9
Gladmer Park/Wascana Park	1870	2	107	0	0	3	160.4	10	534.8
Hillsdale	5725	6	104.8	0	0	0	0	21	366.8
North East	7340	7	95.4	1	13.6	3	40.9	61	831.1
Albert Park	12530	8	63.8	0	0	4	31.9	57	454.9
Dieppe	1630	1	61.3	0	0	0	0	18	1104.3
Uplands	5325	3	56.3	0	0	3	56.3	20	375.6
Lakeview	7720	4	51.8	0	0	3	38.9	101	1308.3
Twin Lakes	5850	3	51.3	0	0	0	0	31	529.9
Dewdney East	17195	8	46.5	0	0	12	69.8	56	325.7
Coronation Park	6855	3	43.8	1	14.6	7	102.1	45	656.5
Regent Park	2805	1	35.7	0	0	3	107	21	748.7
Rosemont/Mount Royal	8600	3	34.9	0	0	2	23.3	68	790.7
Normanview West	2940	1	34	0	0	0	0	17	578.2
Walsh Acres	11750	2	17	0	0	0	0	34	289.4
Whitmore Park	6450	1	15.5	0		0	0	10	155
Prairie View	7015	1	14.3	0	0	0	0	55	784
Arcola East: Gardiner Park, University Park	24000	2	8.3	0	0	4	16.7	73	304.2
Sherwood Estates	6450	0	0	0	0	1	15.5	16	248.1
Normanview	4135	0	0	0	0	0	0	8	193.5
Argyle Park	3795	0	0	0	0	0	0	21	553.4
Boothill	2615	0	0	0	0	1	38.2	20	764.8
McNab	915	0	0	0	0	0	0	7	765
Lakeridge	6200	0	0	0	0	0	0	0	0

== Transportation ==
=== Public transportation ===
The city's public transit agency, Regina Transit, operates a fleet of 110 buses, on 17 routes, and 4 express routes. The service runs 7 days a week with access to the city centre from most areas of the city. Regina formerly had an extensive streetcar (tramway) network but now has no streetcars, trains or subways. A massive fire at the streetcar barns, on 23 January 1949, destroyed much of the rolling stock of streetcars and trolley buses and helped to propel Regina's diesel bus revolution in 1951, although until well into the 1970s the streetcar rails remained in the centre of many major streets, ready to be returned to use should city transit policy change. Because of the 1949 fire, original Regina streetcar rolling stock was rare, though through later years a few disused streetcars remained in evidence – a streetcar with takeaway food, for example, on the site of the Regina Theatre at 12th Avenue and Hamilton Street, until the Hudson's Bay Company acquired the site and built its 60s-through-90s department store there.

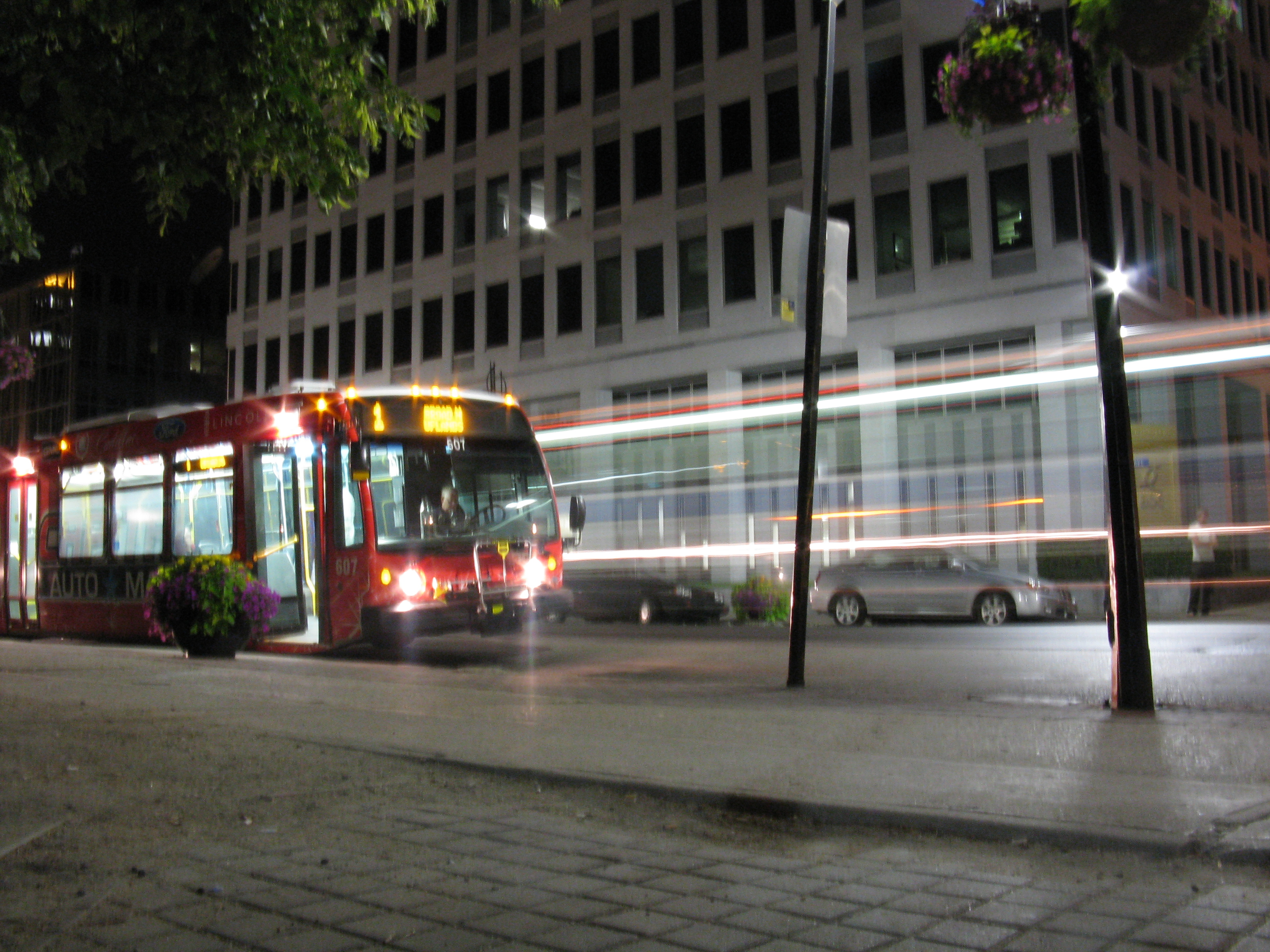
Operating a fleet of buses, Regina Transit is a public transportation agency operated by the city.

Major roads in the city include Ring Road, a high speed connection between Regina's east and northwest that loops around the city's east side. The west side of the loop is formed by a south–north route, Lewvan Drive, which becomes Pasqua Street in the city's north end. This route connects the Trans-Canada highway and Highway 11. Also, the Regina Bypass encircles the city farther out.

=== Inter-city transportation ===
By road, Regina can be reached by several highways including the Trans-Canada Highway from the west and east sides and four provincial highways (6, 11, 33, 46) from other directions.

By air, Regina International Airport serves Regina and area. As of January 2023, non-stop scheduled flights go to and from Calgary, Edmonton, Toronto, Vancouver, and Winnipeg. There are seasonal flights to and from Montreal (summer), Las Vegas, Orlando, Phoenix, and destinations in Mexico and the Caribbean (winter). The airport is situated on the west side of the city and is the oldest established commercial airport in Canada. The current, continually expanded, 1960 terminal replaces the original 1940 Art Deco terminal; it has recently undergone further major upgrades and expansions to allow it to handle increases in traffic for the next several years. Private aircraft is facilitated at the Regina Flying Club and Western Air hangars near the Regina International Airport.

By bus, Rider Express, whose Regina office and stop are located at 1517 11th Avenue, provides direct inter-city bus service from Regina to centres along the Trans-Canada Highway and Highway 11. The Saskatchewan Transportation Company (STC), a Saskatchewan Crown Corporation, provided bus service in the province until it was shut down in 2017. Greyhound Canada discontinued service in Saskatchewan and Western Canada in 2018. The five decades-old bus depot on Hamilton Street immediately south of the Hotel Saskatchewan was replaced in 2008 by one at 1717 Saskatchewan Drive (corner of Saskatchewan Drive and Broad Street). This building has been converted into the new Regina Police Service headquarters as of 2019.

By rail, inter-city passenger train service has not operated in Regina since 1990. In the past, passenger trains constituted the principal mode of transportation among Western Canadian cities. The last Via Rail train left Regina on January 16, 1990. Regina's Union Station in the city's downtown became Casino Regina.

== Media ==
The daily newspaper for the city is The Leader-Post, first published in 1883 and currently owned by Postmedia Network. The Regina Sun was published on weekends by The Leader-Post and distributed free of charge until 2015.

Prairie Dog was established in 1993 and is a free alternative newspaper and blog produced by a Saskatchewan worker co-operative. L'eau vive is a weekly newspaper publishing in French and serving all of Saskatchewan's francophone community.

The thirteen radio stations broadcasting from the city include CHBD-FM 92.7, CKRM 620, CJME News/Talk 980, FM 90.3 CJLR-FM-4 MBC Radio First Nations community radio Missinipi Broadcasting Corporation, FM 91.3 CJTR-FM 91.3 CJTR community radio, FM 97.7 CBKF-FM Première Chaîne news/talk (CBC, French), and FM 102.5 CBKR-FM CBC Radio One news/talk (CBC).

There are four private and public television channels broadcasting from Regina: CKCK-TV (CTV), CBKT (CBC), CFRE-TV (Global), and CBKFT (SRC). Educational channel City Saskatchewan (formerly the Saskatchewan Communications Network) and a community channel owned by Regina's cable provider Access Communications are also available on cable.

== Friendship and sister city relations ==
The City of Regina maintains trade development programs, cultural, and educational partnerships in a twinning agreement with Bucharest, Romania and Jinan, Shandong, China, and a friendship agreement with Fujioka, Gunma, Japan.

City	Country	Date
Bucharest	Romania	2011
Jinan	China	1987
Fujioka	Japan	2019

== See also ==
- HMCS Regina
- List of mayors of Regina, Saskatchewan
- Royal eponyms in Canada

== Bibliography ==
- "Germantown" 11th Avenue East. Regina's Heritage Tours, City of Regina, 1994.
- Argan, William (2000). Cornerstones 2: An Artist's History of the City of Regina. Regina: Centax Books.
- Argan, William (1995). Cornerstones: An Artist's History of the City of Regina. Regina: Centax Books.
- Barnhart, Gordon (2002). Building for the Future: A Photo Journal of Saskatchewan's Legislative Building. Canadian Plains Research Center. ISBN 0-88977-145-6.
- Brennan, J. William (1989). Regina, an illustrated history. Toronto: James Lorimer & Co.
- Brennan, William J., ed. (1978). Regina Before Yesterday: A Visual History 1882 to 1945. City of Regina.
- 'Castles of the North: Canada's Grand Hotels. Toronto: Lynx Images Inc. 2001.
- Chapel Royal Canadian Mounted Police (1990). Training Academy (brochure). Regina, Saskatchewan.
- Drake, Earl G. (1955). Regina, the Queen City. Toronto: McClelland & Stewart.
- Hughes, Bob (2004). The Big Dig: the Miracle of Wascana Centre. Regina: Centax Books.
- Neal, May (1953). Regina, Queen City of the Plains: 50 Years of Progress. Regina: Western Printers.
- Regina Court House Official Opening (brochure). 1961.
- Regina Leader-Post
- Riddell, W. A. (1962). The Origin and Development of Wascana Centre. Regina.
- The Morning Leader
