= Coat of arms of Regina, Saskatchewan =

Coat of Arms of Regina
- Armiger: Regina, Saskatchewan
- Adopted: September 5, 1992
- Crest: On a mural crown Azure masoned Or the central three merlons supporting a representation of the Royal Crown proper
- Shield: Azure a garb Or on a chief Bleu-Céleste a buffalo statant Or
- Supporters: On a grassy mound proper dexter a North-West Mounted Policeman circa 1882 sinister a Royal Canadian Mounted Policewoman circa 1992 both in uniform proper
- Motto: FLOREAT REGINA

The coat of arms of Regina, Saskatchewan is the full armorial achievement as used by the municipal government as an official symbol.

== Blazon ==
Arms: Azure a garb Or on a chief Bleu-Céleste a buffalo statant Or;

Crest: On a mural crown Azure masoned Or the central three merlons supporting a representation of the Royal Crown proper;

Supporters: On a grassy mound proper dexter a North-West Mounted Policeman circa 1882 sinister a Royal Canadian Mounted Policewoman circa 1992 both in uniform proper;
