= Saskatchewan Science Centre =

Museum in Saskatchewan, Canada

Coordinates: 50.4331°N 104.5942°W

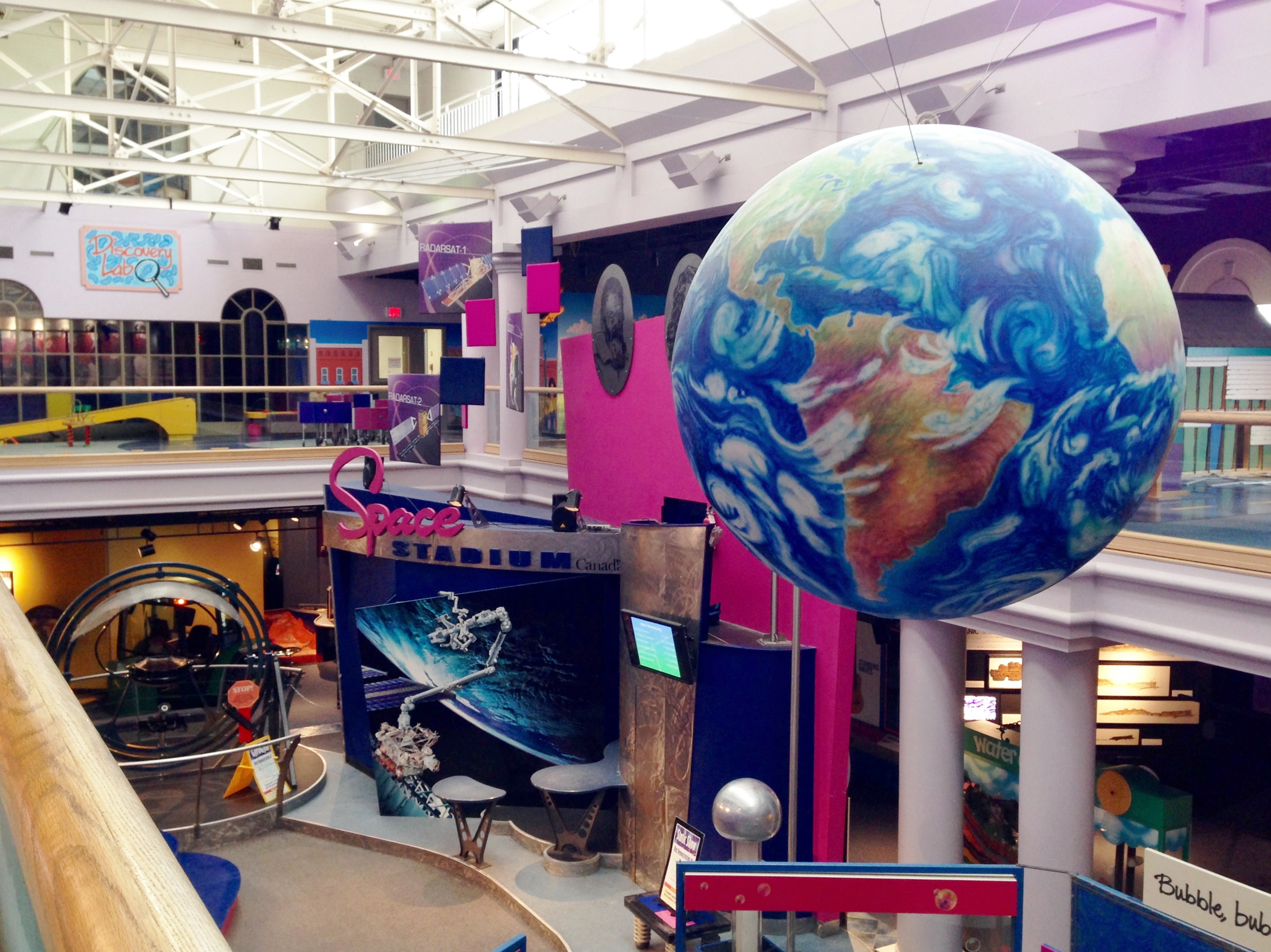
- Established: 1989
- Location: Regina, Saskatchewan
- Type: Science museum
- Website: http://www.sasksciencecentre.com/

The Saskatchewan Science Centre is an interactive science museum in Regina, Saskatchewan. It is owned and operated as a not-for-profit charitable organization. Located in a former power plant in the Wascana Centre, the Saskatchewan Science Centre was officially opened in April 1989 as the Powerhouse of Discovery. In 1991, the Science Centre was expanded with the Kramer IMAX Theater.

== Principal activities and programming ==
The exhibit floor contains permanent displays, travelling exhibits, interactive demonstrations, and stage shows.

Educational and entertainment programs are delivered to students and communities all across Saskatchewan, including remote through the Science Outreach program.

Special events at the centre include Adult Science Nights, the Ignite! Festival, the After Dark Film Series, and Fantasy Food, and attendance at public events such as Canada Day celebrations.

== Permanent exhibits ==
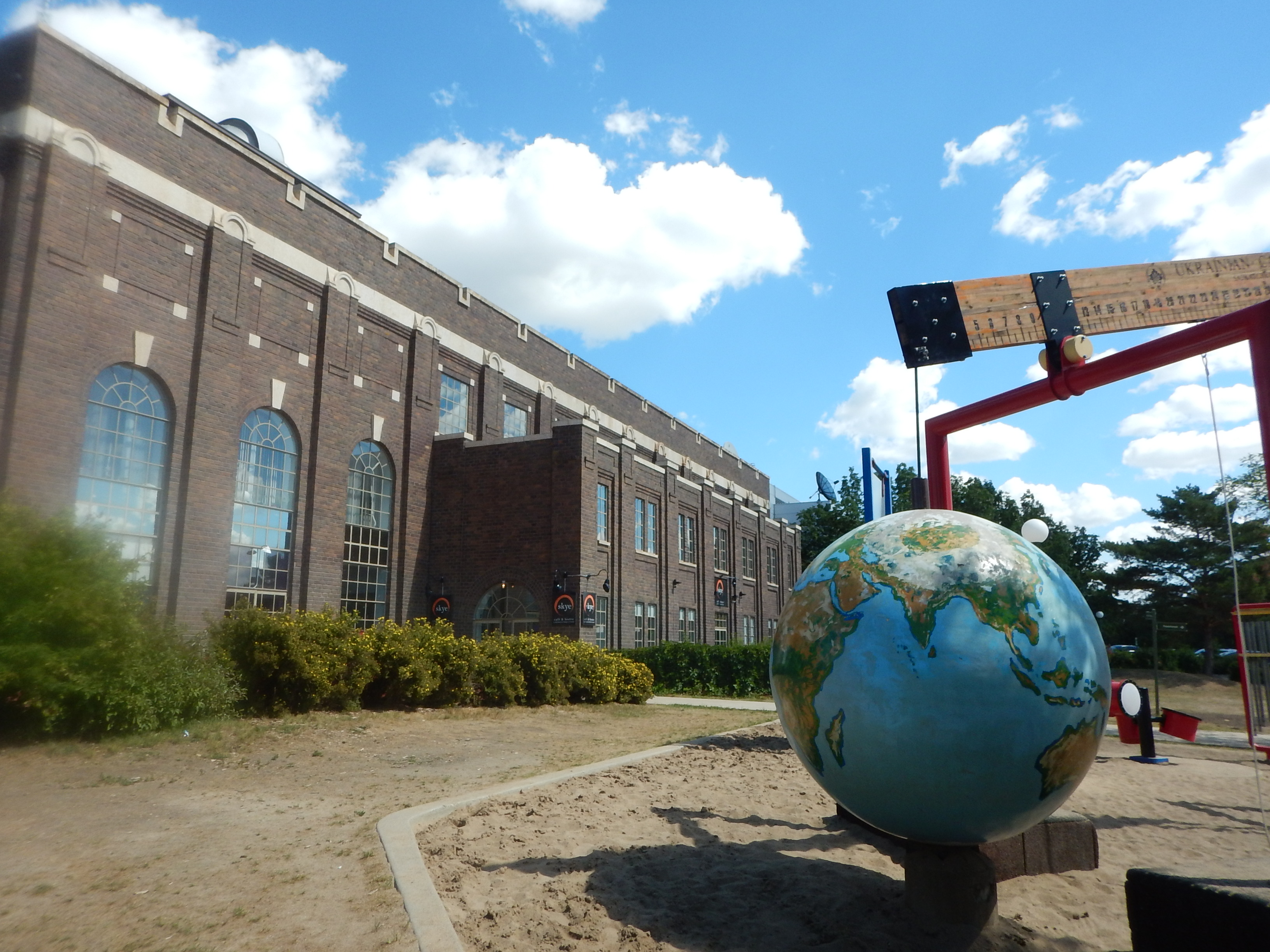
The Ukrainian Science Park

The Saskatchewan Science Centre's permanent exhibits are its backbone. They are complemented by travelling and temporary exhibits and occasional special programs run by the centre. The Science Centre features various permanent displays highlighting different topics.

Critters!
The exhibit includes many live animals, such as a bearded dragon, sugar glider, great horned owl, snakes, and salamanders.

Ukrainian Science Park
Outside the Science Centre, there is a free-access children's playground with structures demonstrating physics, such as pulleys and tunnels.

WILD! Saskatchewan
An interactive exhibit about the environment and environmental conservation;

Space Stadium Canada
The exhibit highlights and explores Canadian contributions to Space exploration. Features the gyro gym, a spinning device similar to one that NASA developed for astronaut training.

Richardson Ag-Grow-Land
The exhibit focuses on Saskatchewan's contributions to the agriculture industry and the technologies and logistics common to modern industrial farming.

Science of Hockey
This is an exhibit exploring hockey through a scientific lens. It features a game with a brainwave-controlled ball and several physical tests where participants can compete.

== Kramer IMAX Theatre ==
The Kramer IMAX Theatre is the only IMAX theatre in Regina, opening in 1991. It completed its conversion to IMAX 3D in October 2010.

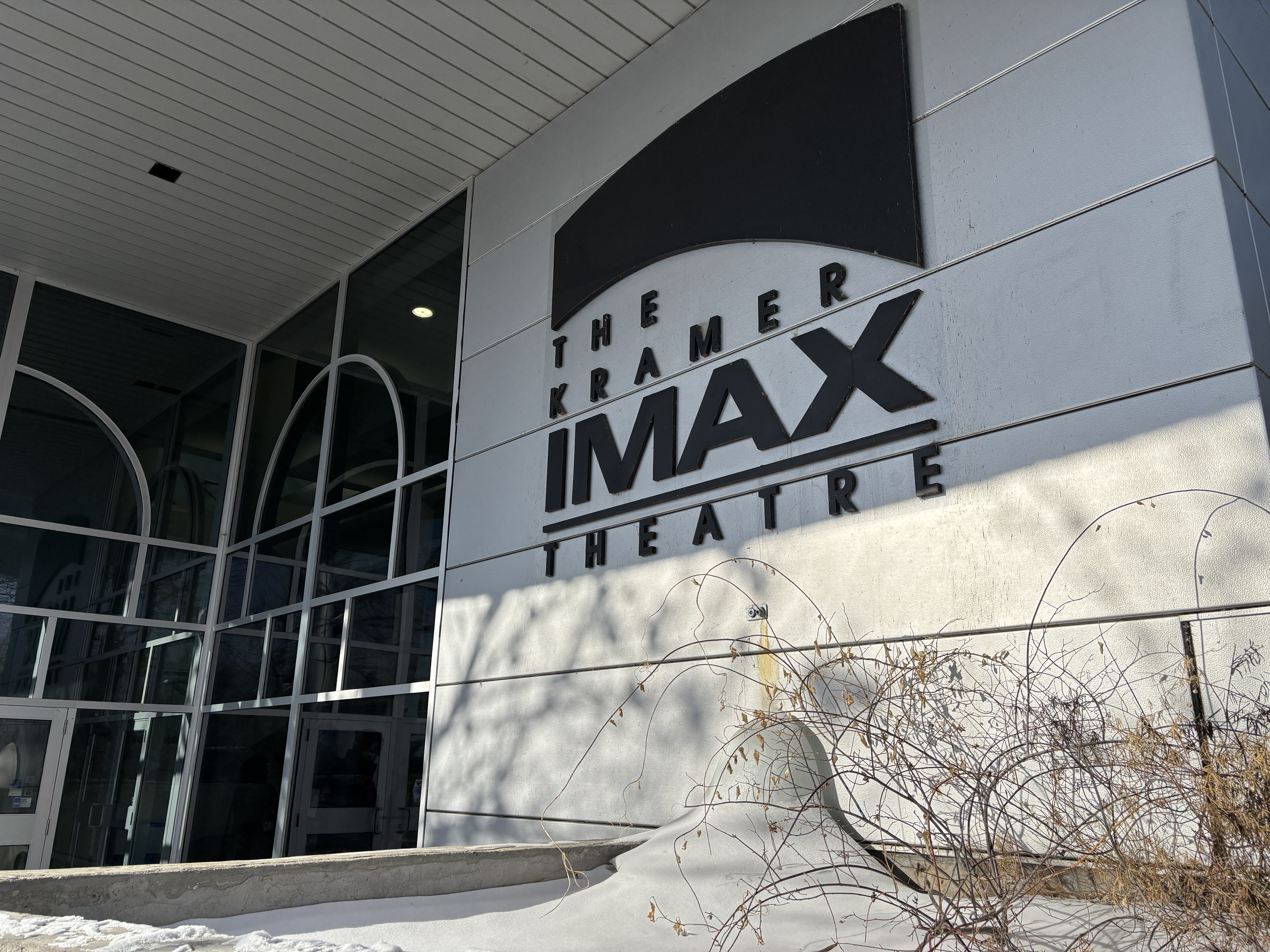

In 2023, the theatre underwent further renovations to install an updated digital laser projector, replacing one of the two traditional 70 millimetre film projectors inside. It allowed the theatre to show a wider range of movies alongside its regular educational offerings.

Other changes included the addition of a new screen and upgrades to the sound system to a 12-channel Dolby Atmos.

Among other benefits, the theatre keeping one of its film projectors operational made it one of only two theatres in Canada capable of screening Interstellar on 70 mm for its 10th anniversary in December 2024.

== Affiliations ==
The Science Centre is affiliated with the Saskatchewan Museums Association and the Canadian Association of Science Centres.

== Gallery ==
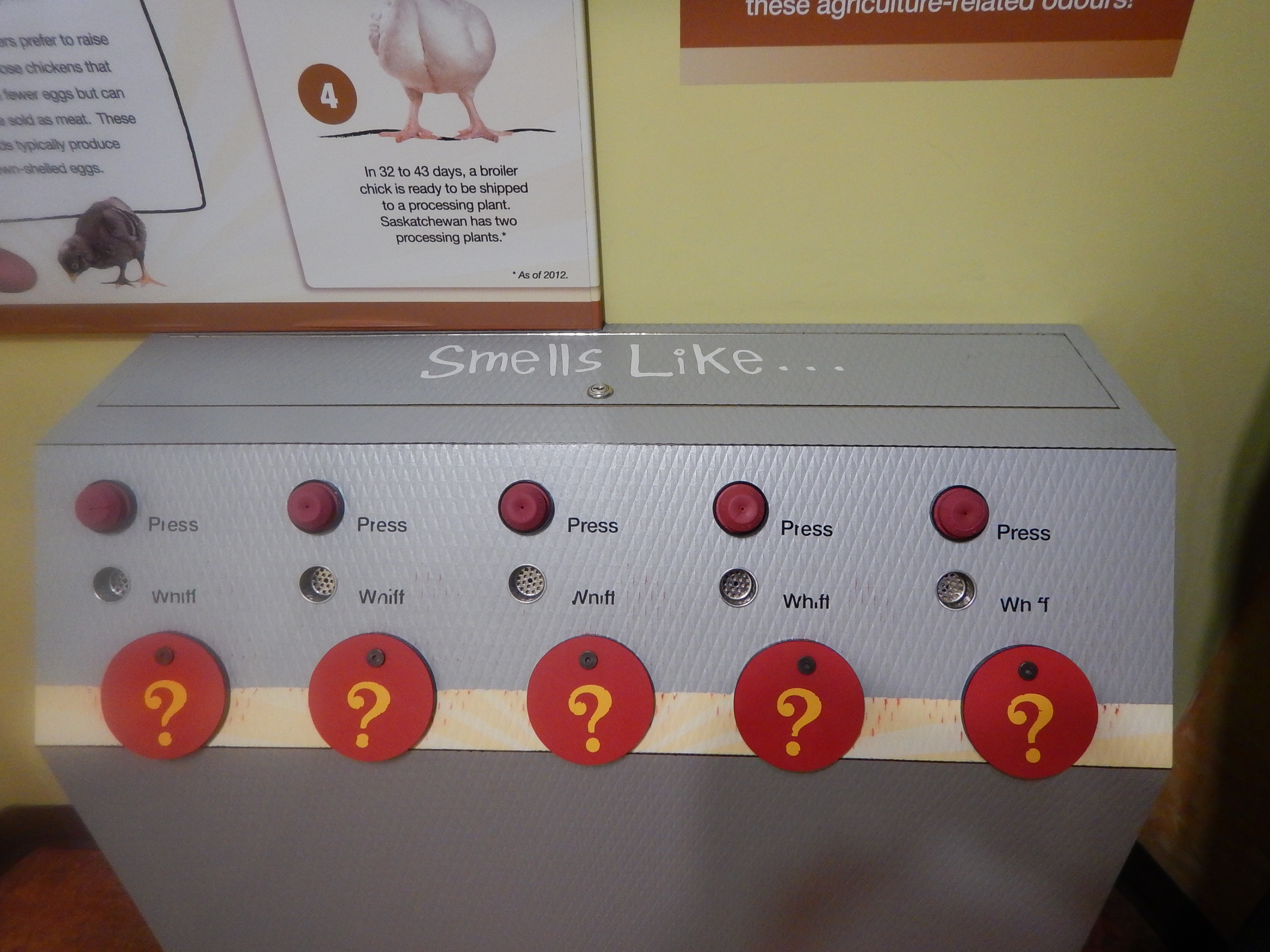
"smells like" buttons

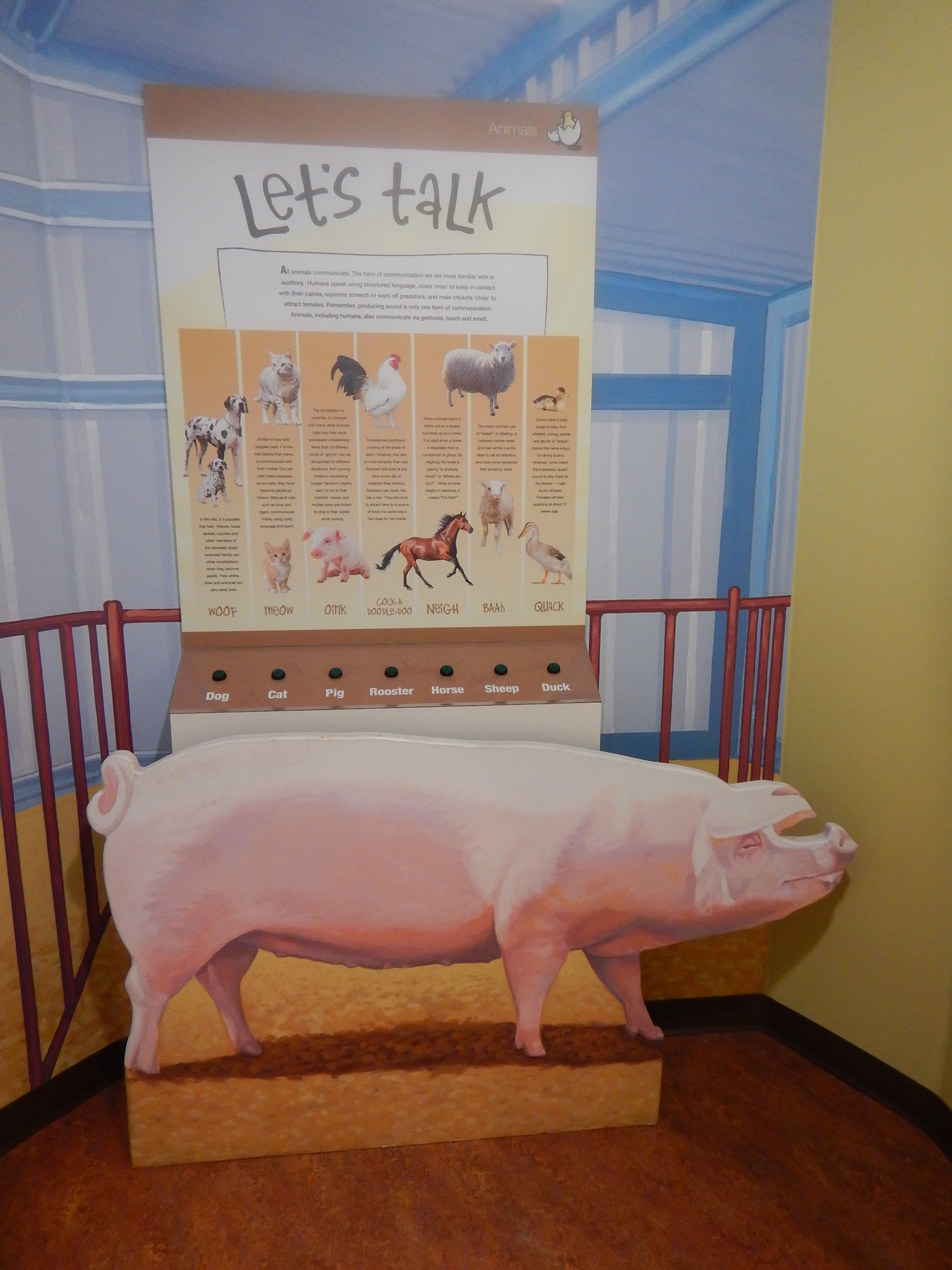
"sounds like" buttons

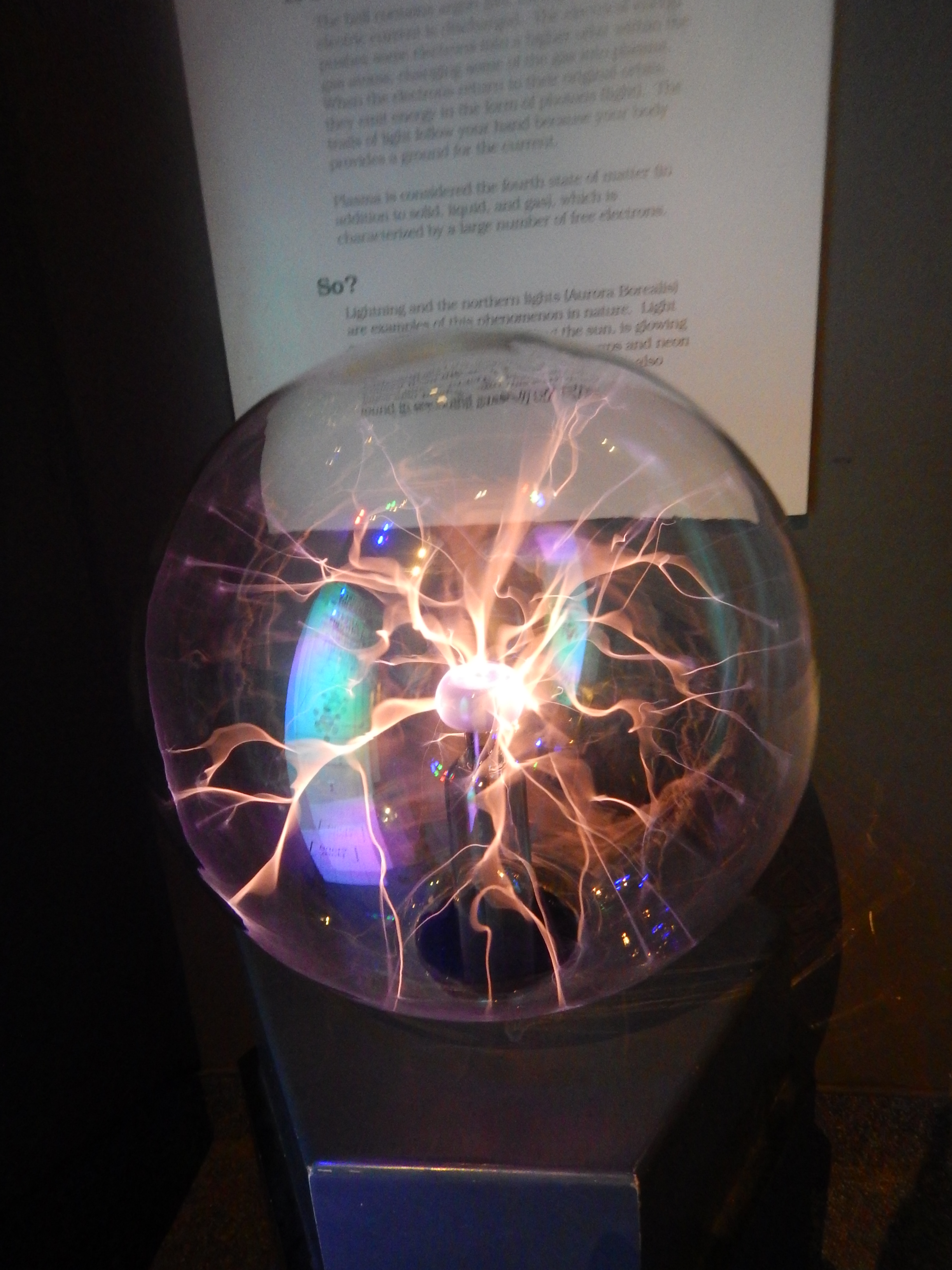
Lightning and northern lights (Aurora Borealis)

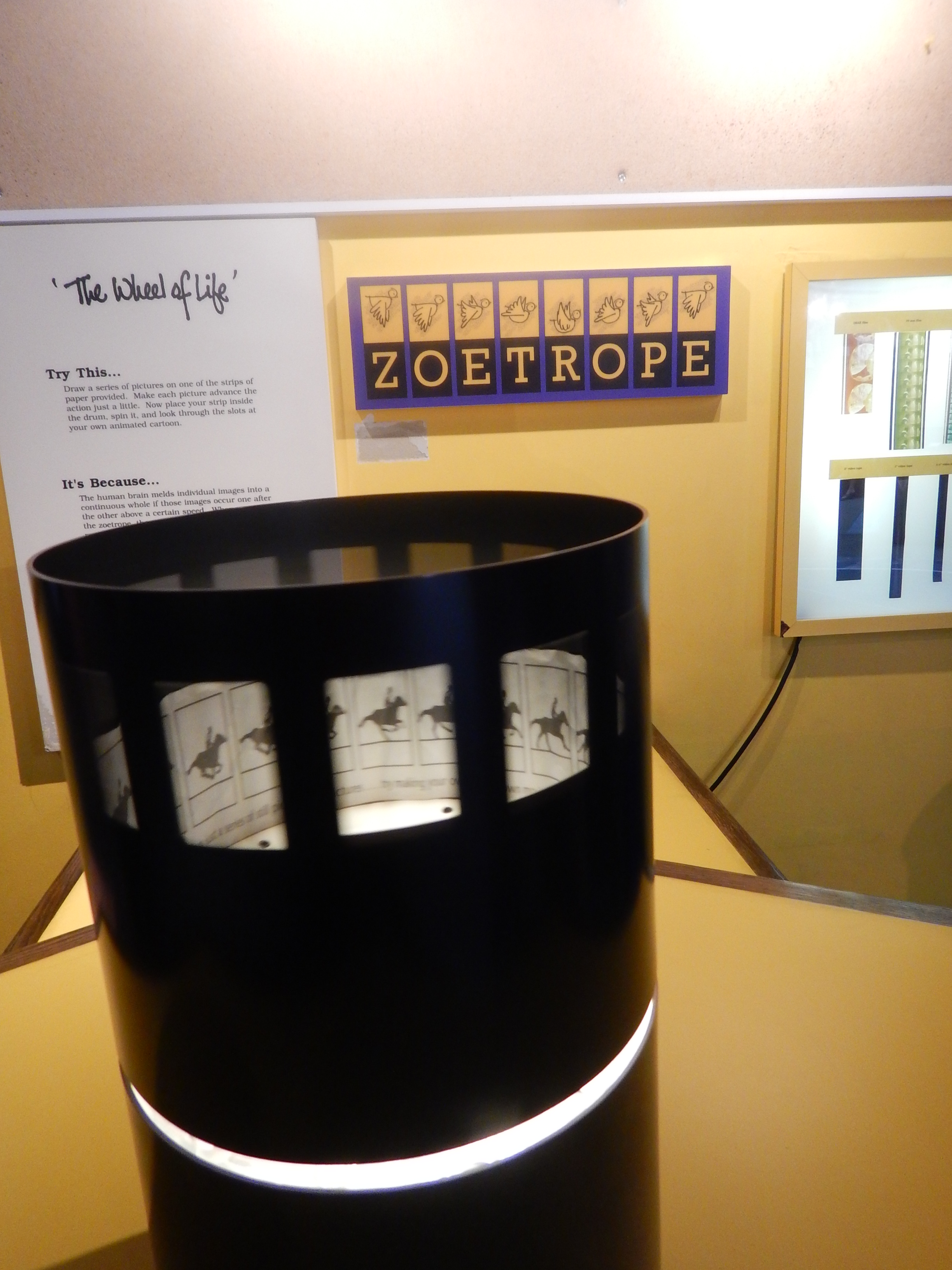
the wheel of life

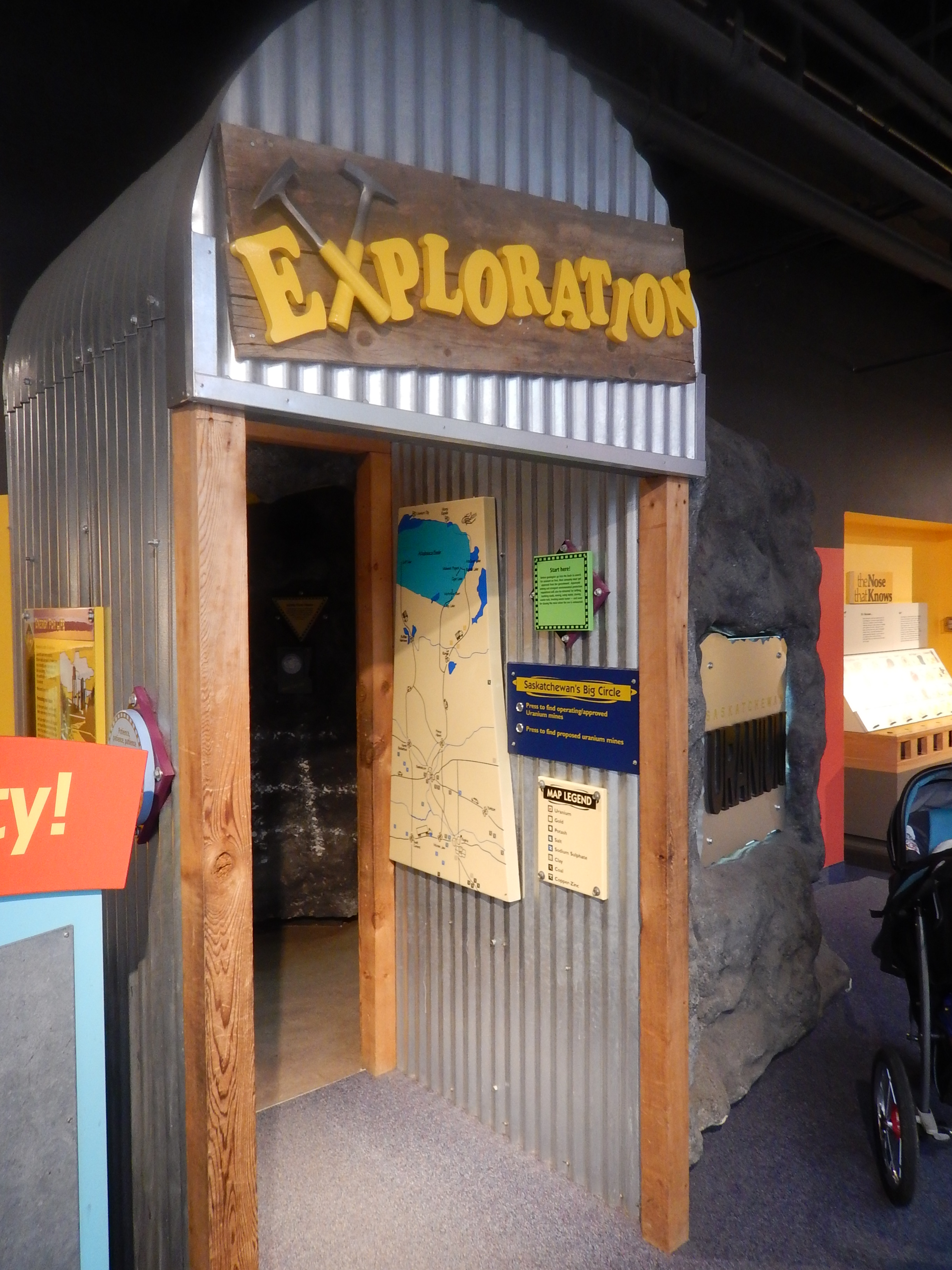
Uranium mines exhibit

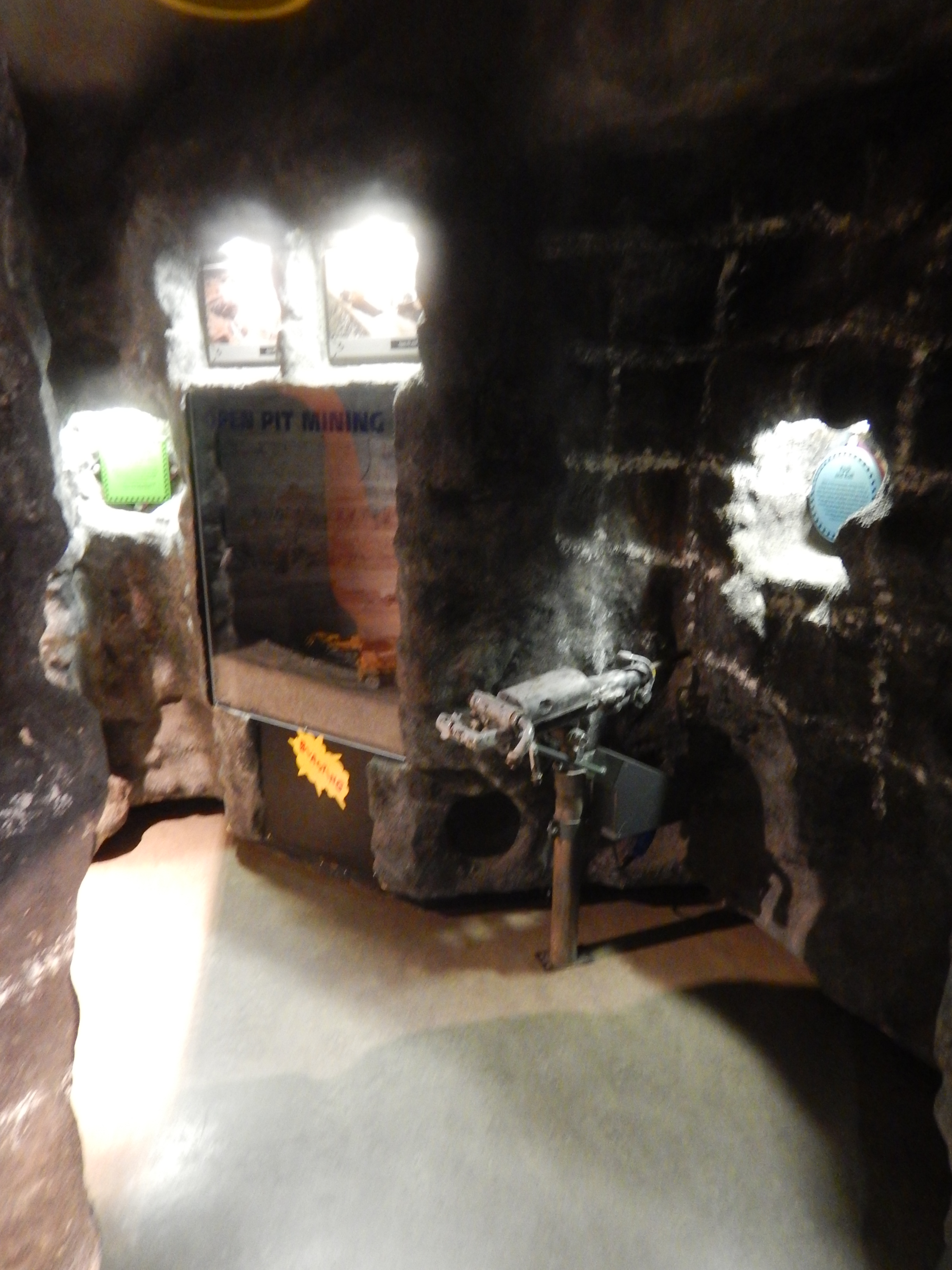
open pit mining

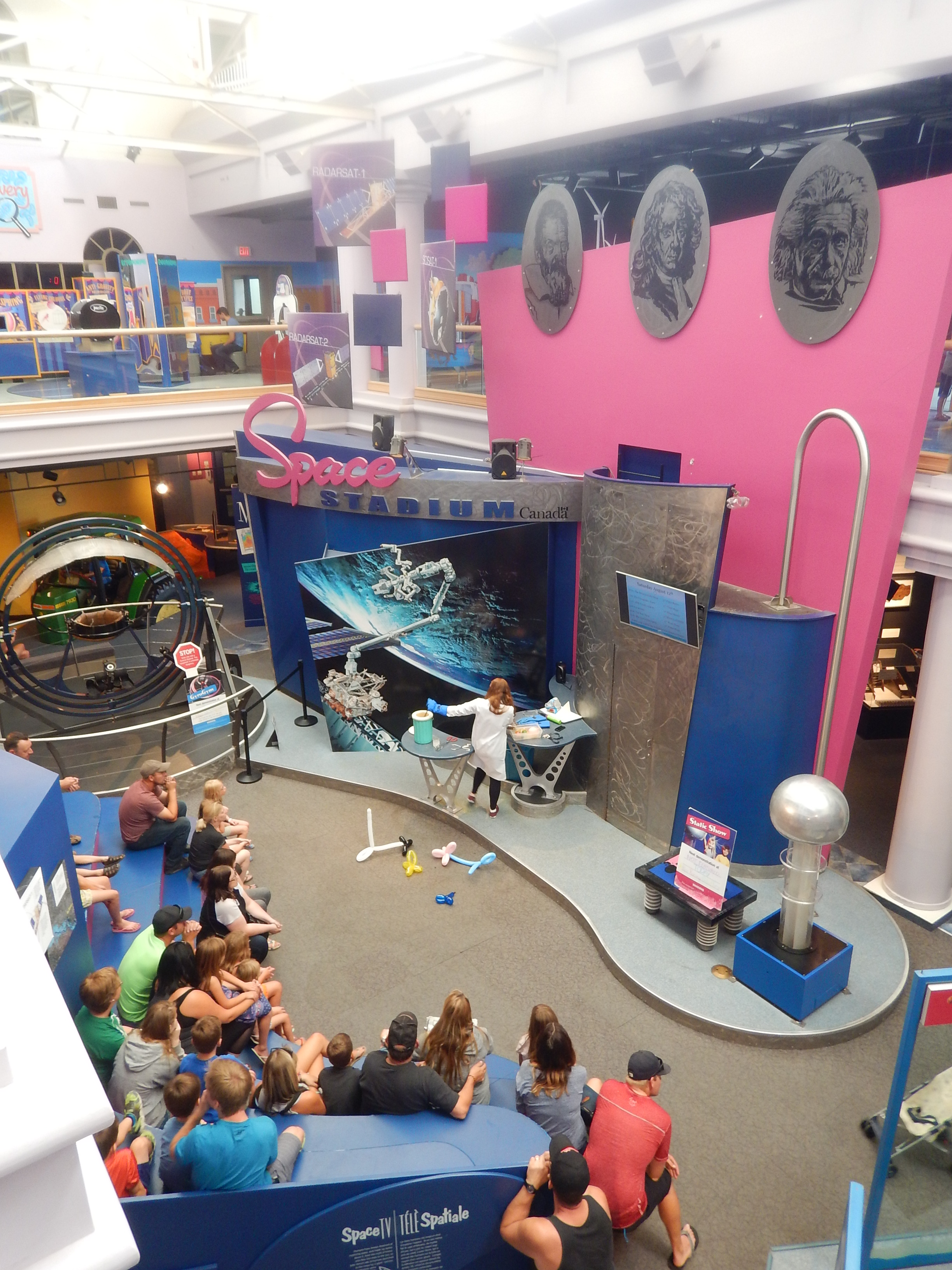
space stadium

=== Fossil exhibit ===
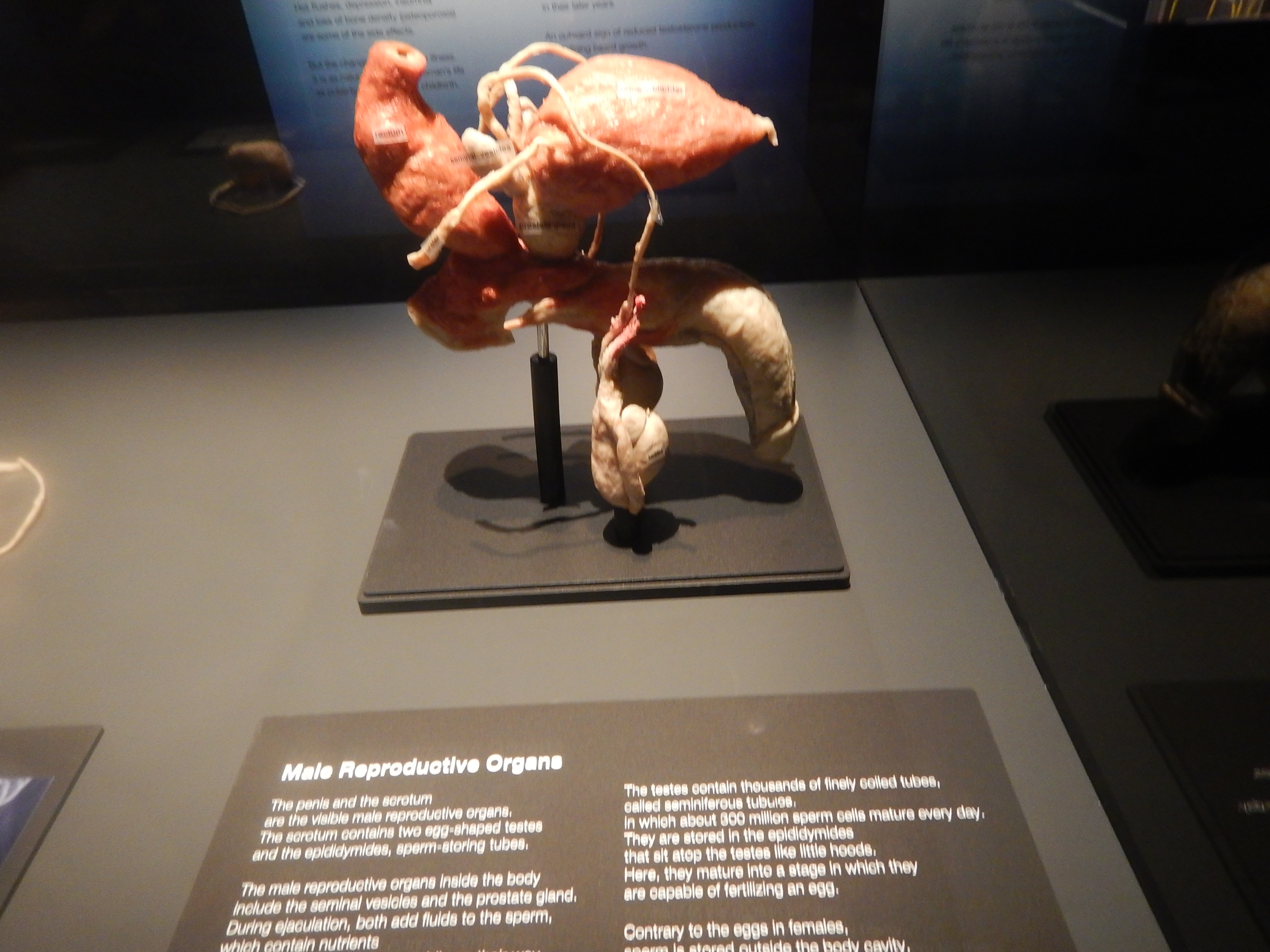
display of the Male reproductive organs

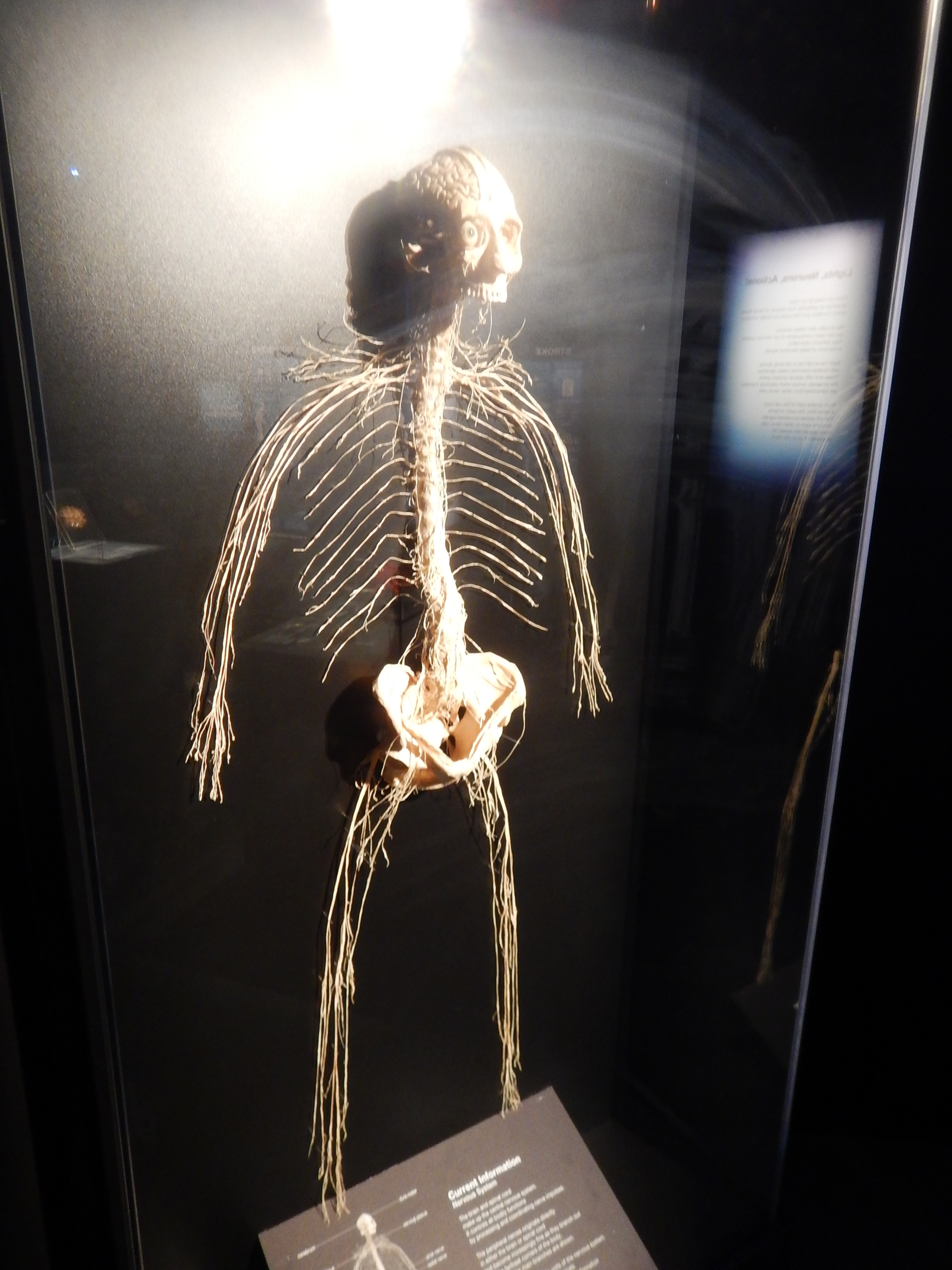
display of the nervous system

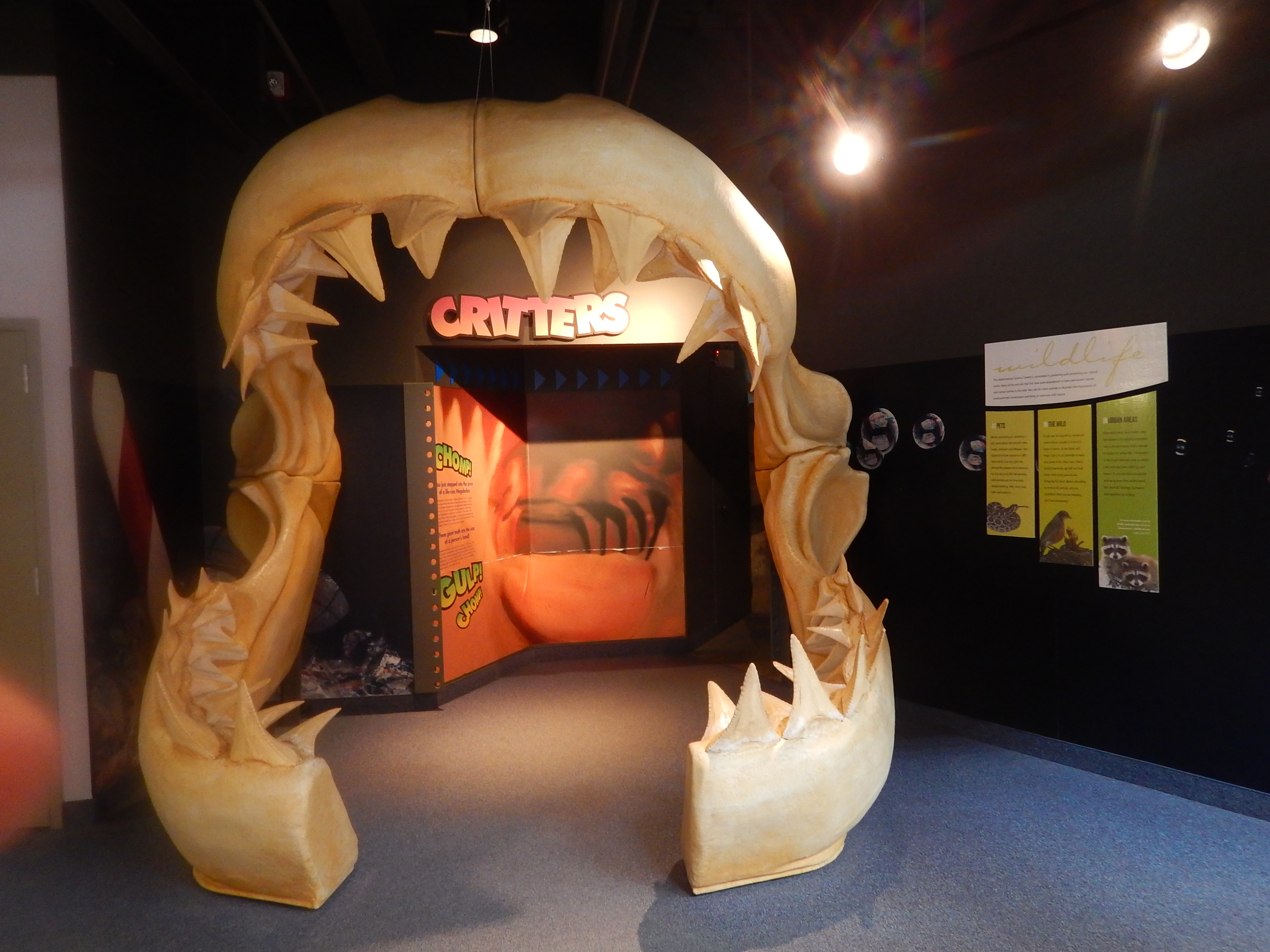
displayed of the jaw of a megalodon

=== Mammal exhibit ===
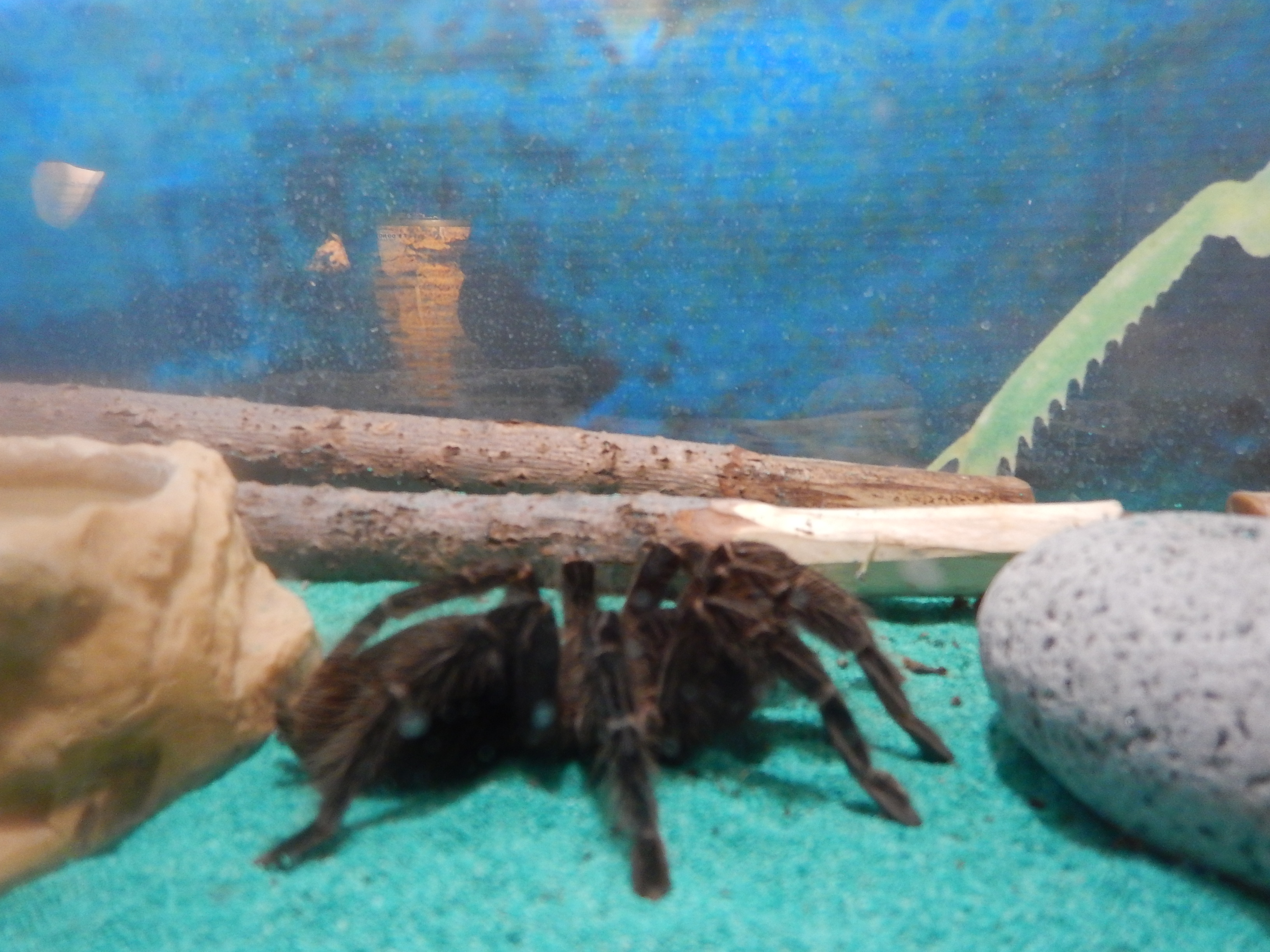
Display of the Tarantula

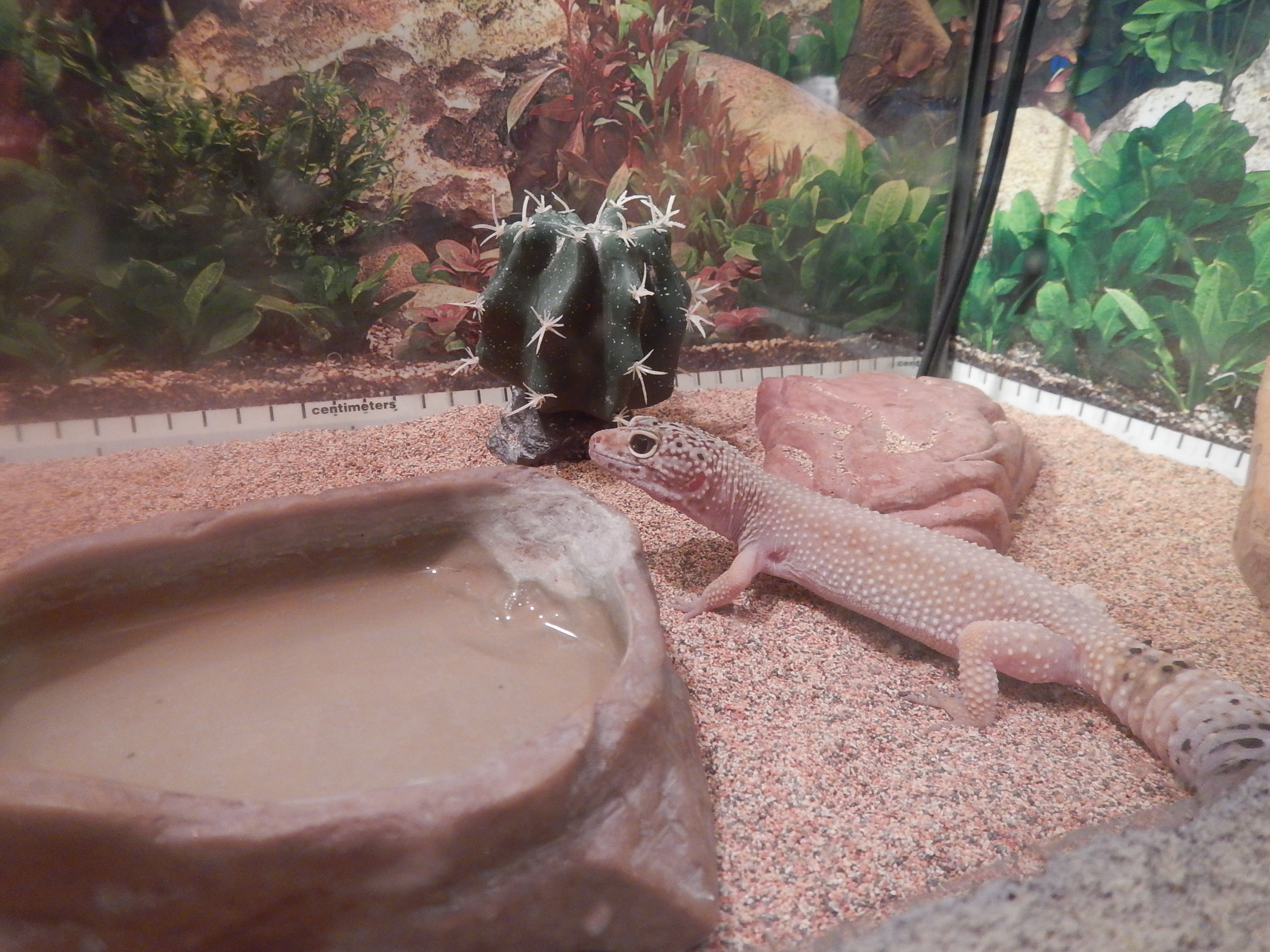
display of a Leopard gecko

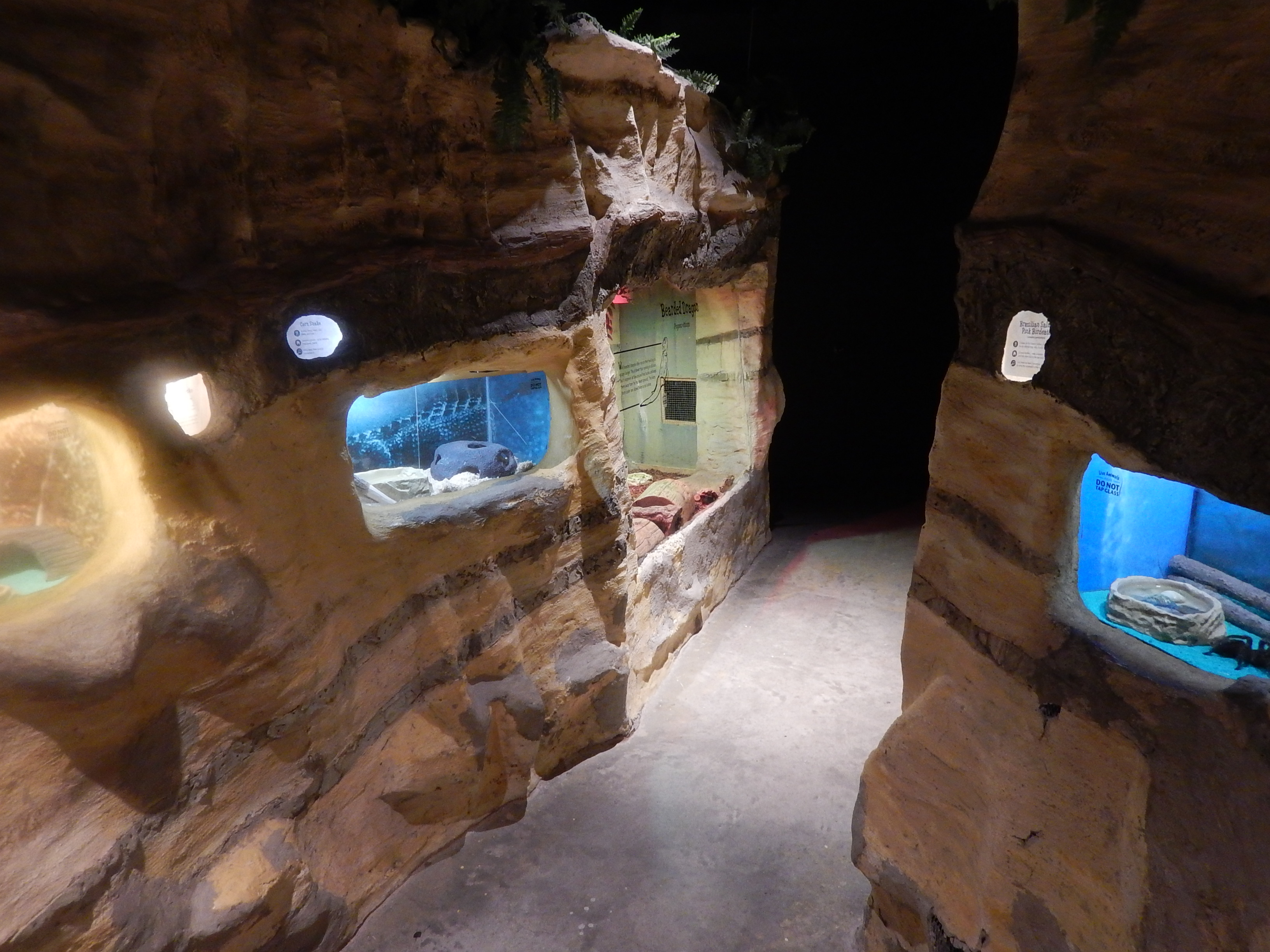
mammal sanctuary

=== Train exhibit ===
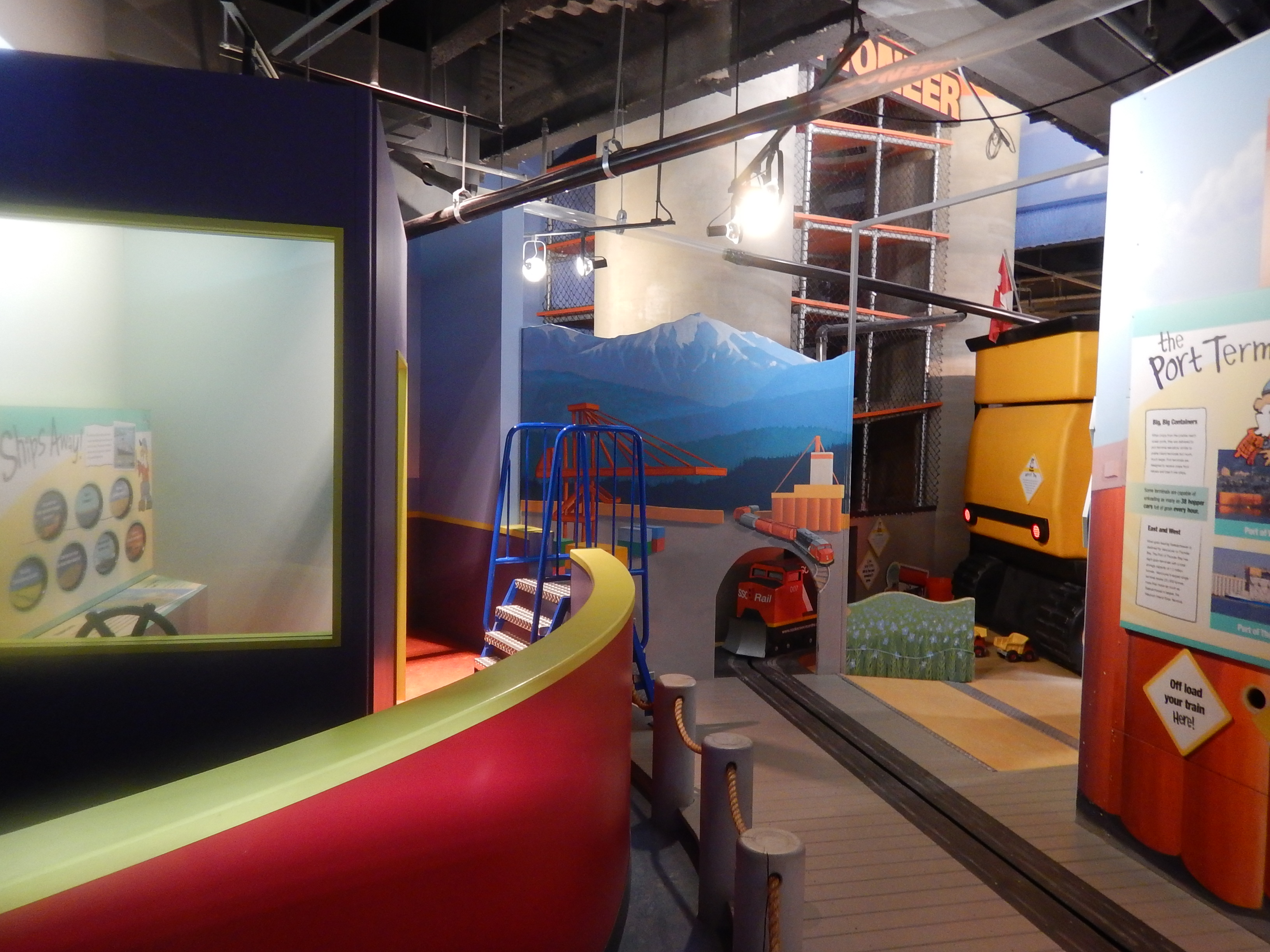
SSC railways

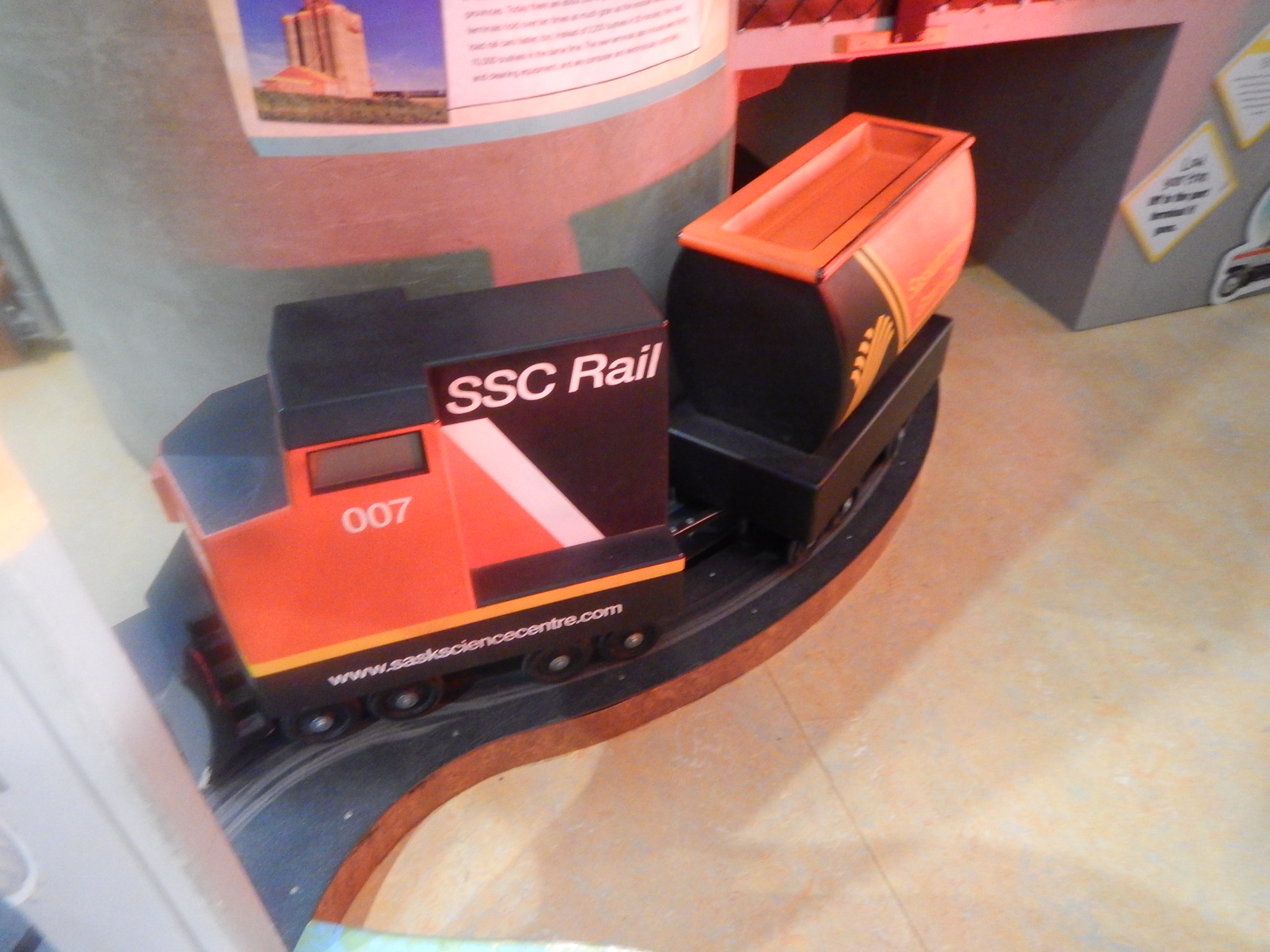
SSC railway

=== LEGO Ancient Egypt exhibit ===
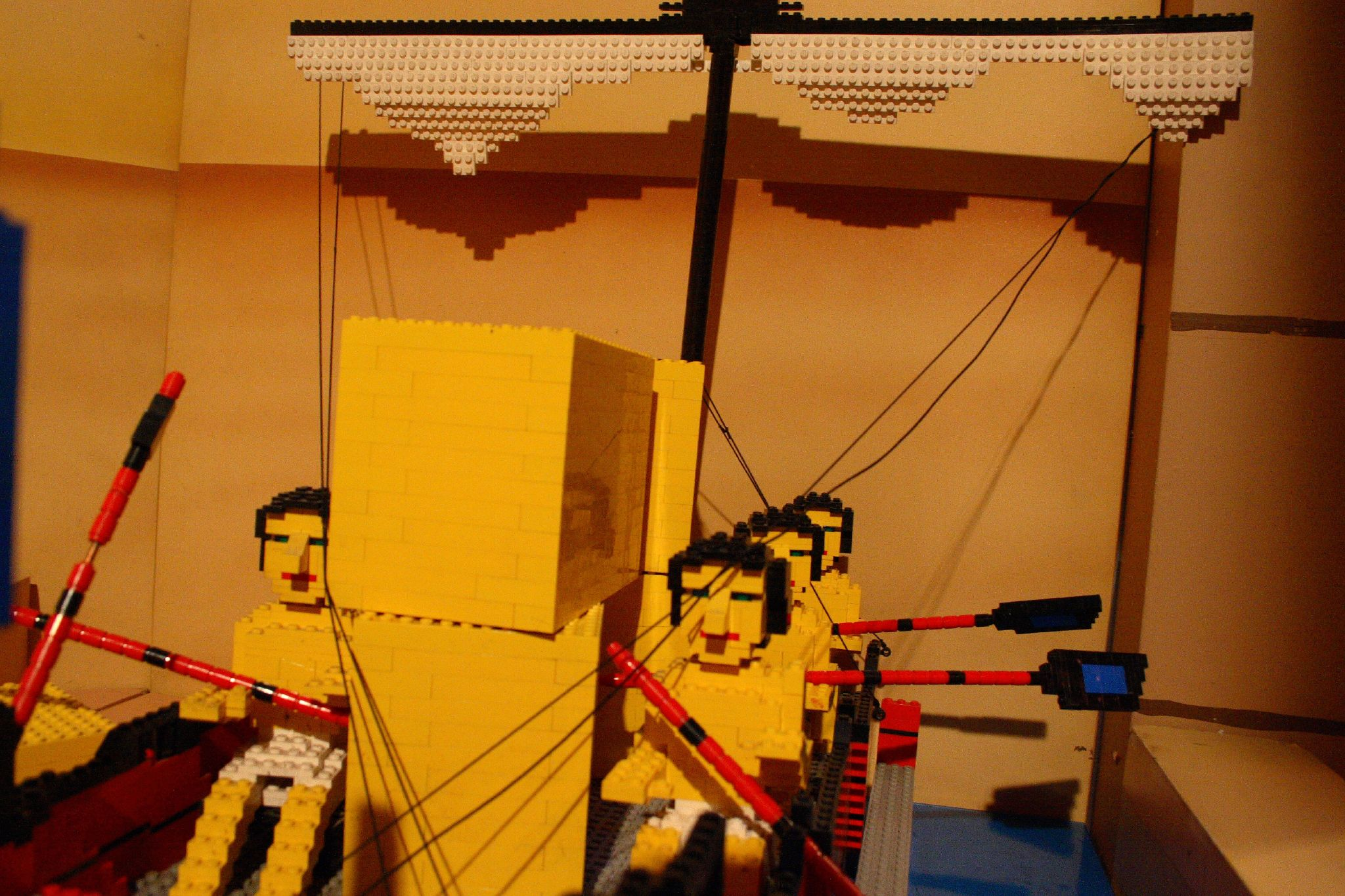
Block in boat on the River Nile

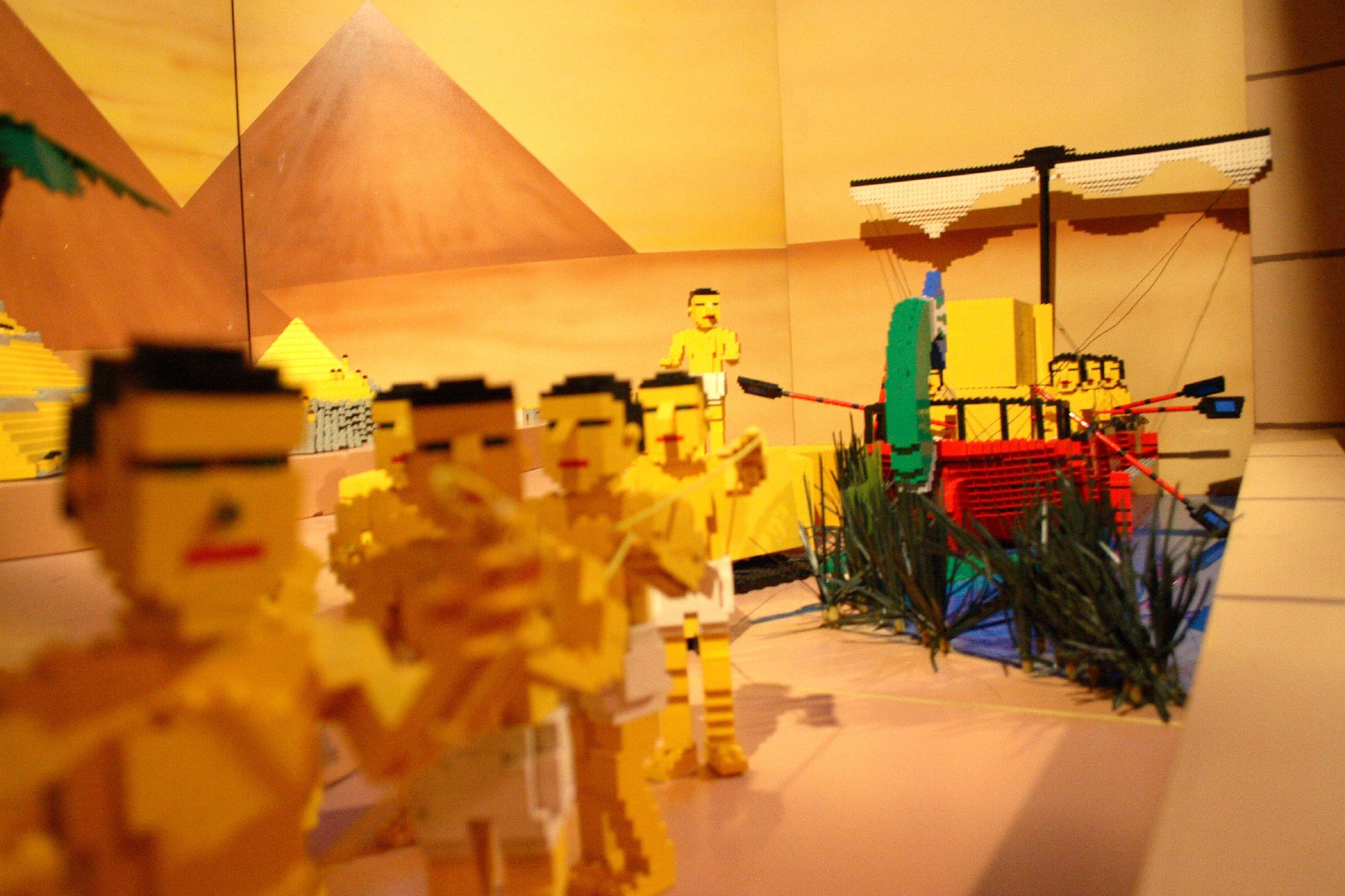
Block in boat on the River Nile

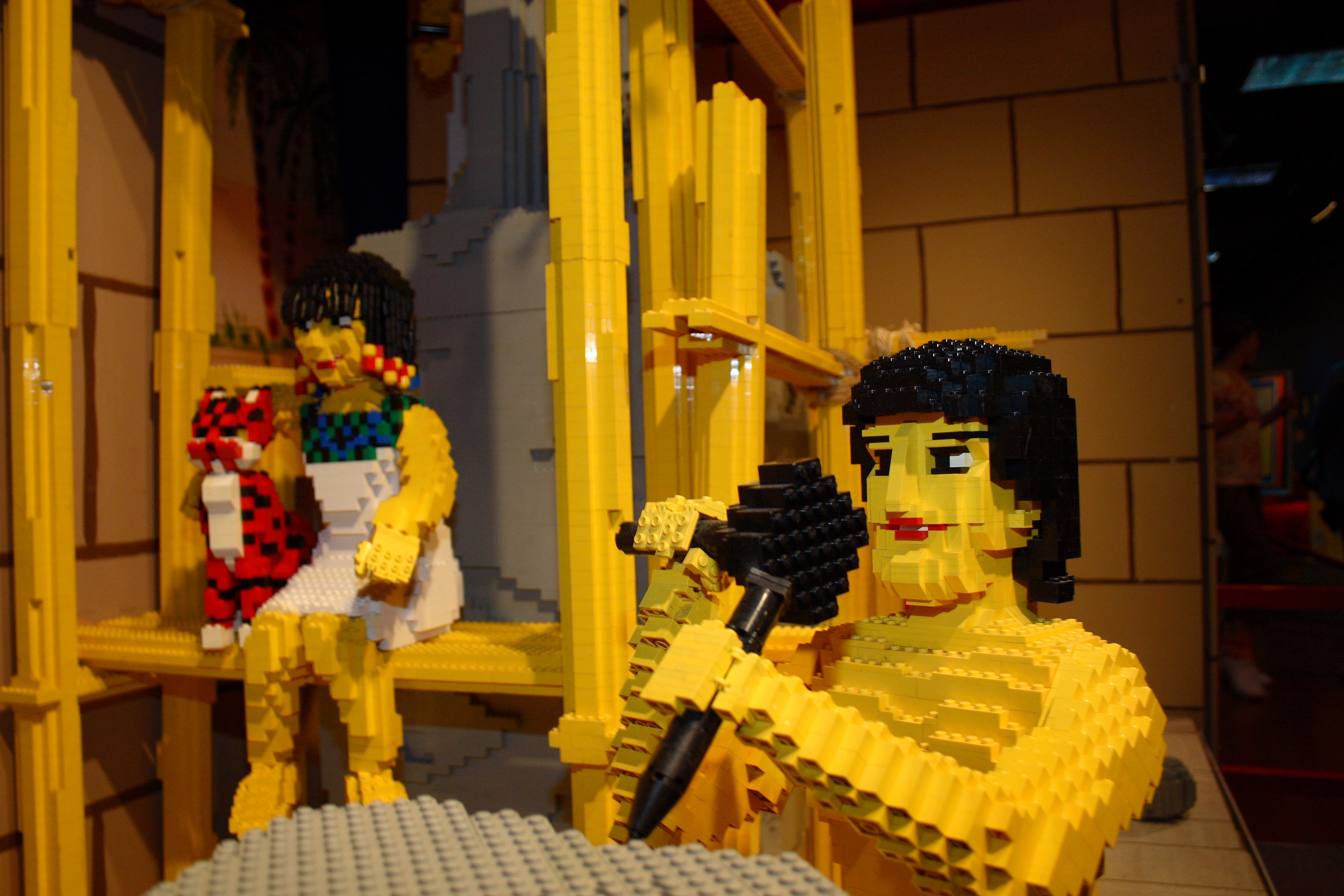
block tailor #I

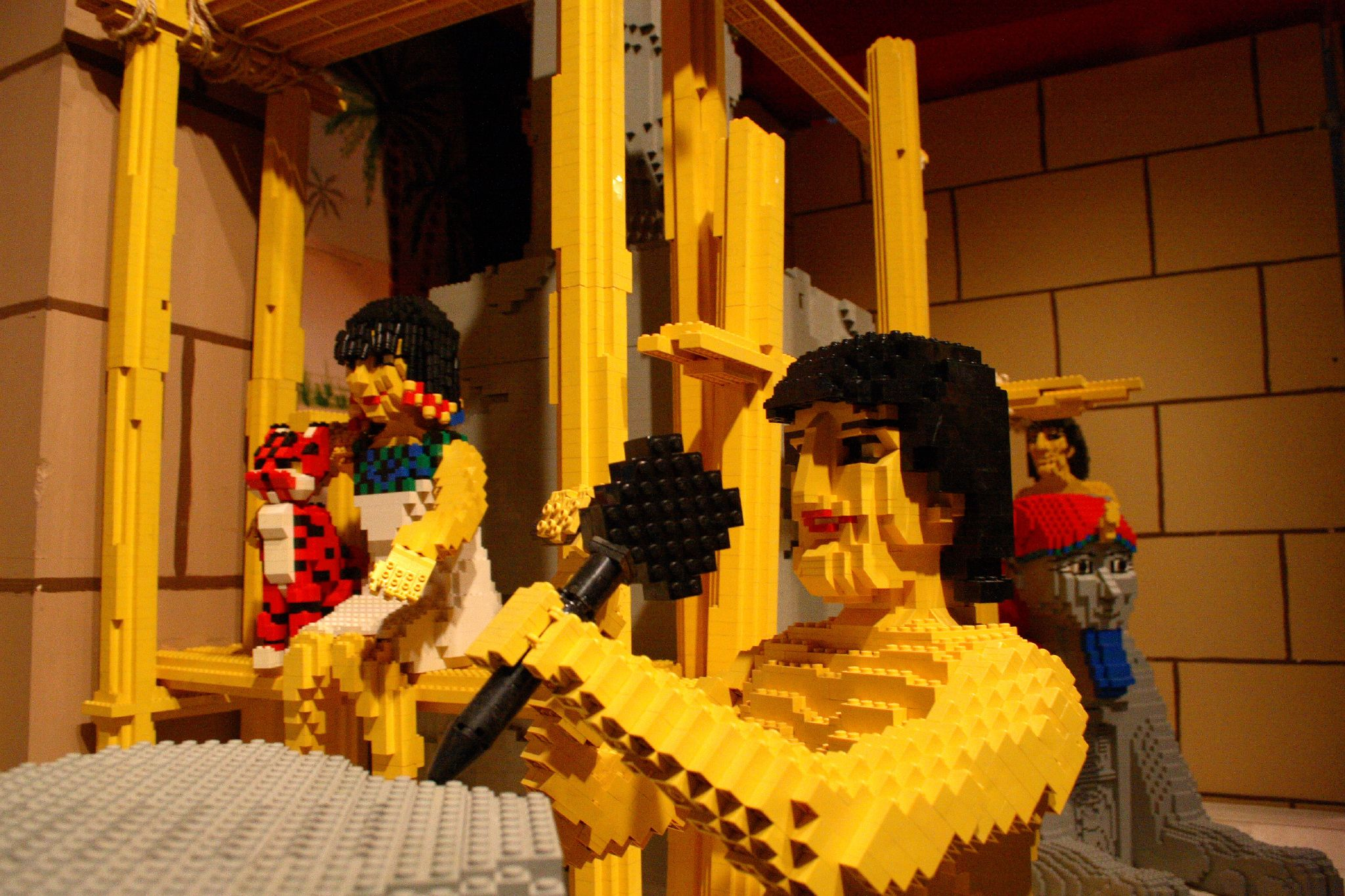
block tailor (#II)

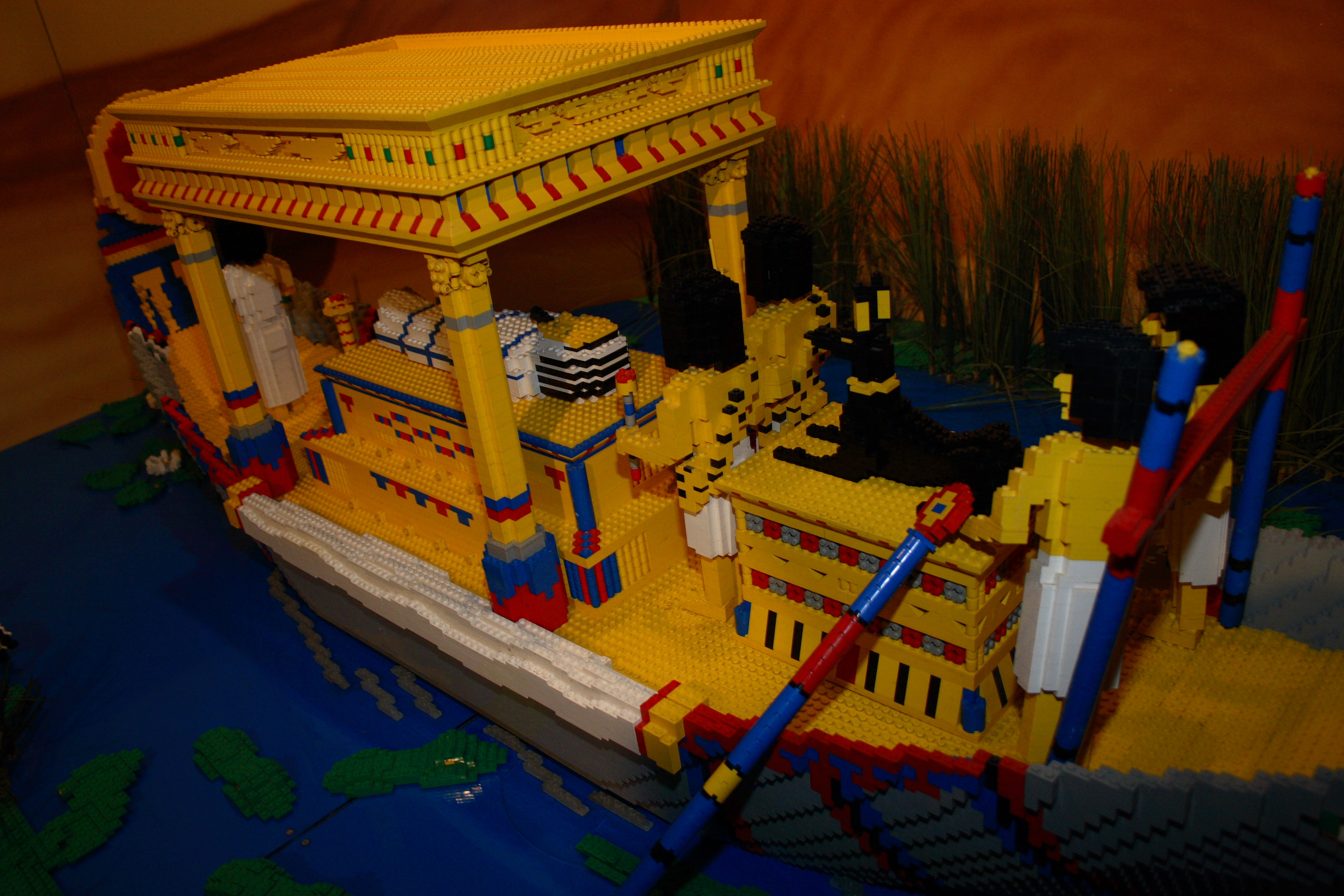
Boat on the Nile (#I)

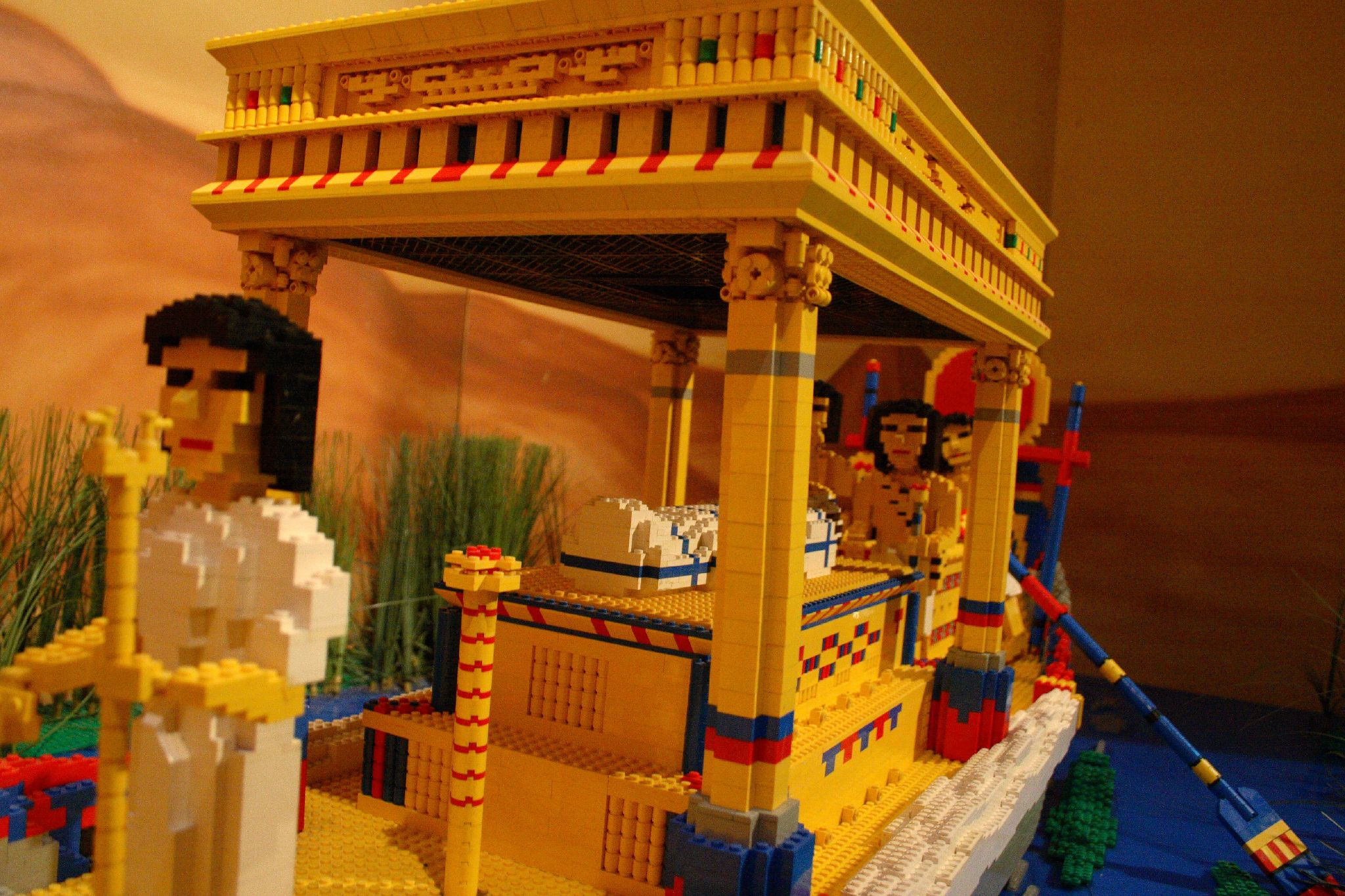
Boat on the Nile (#II)

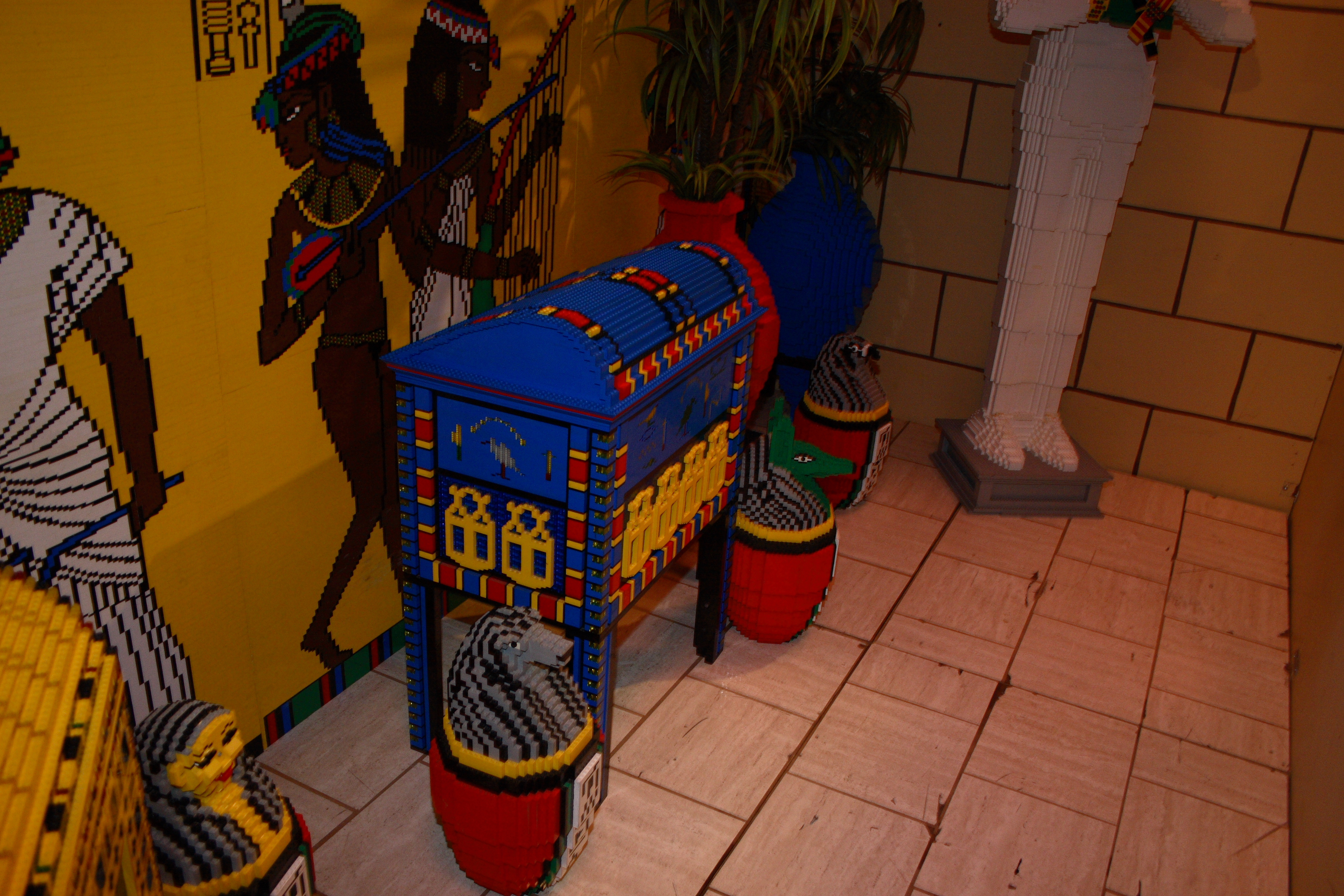
case and 4 jars

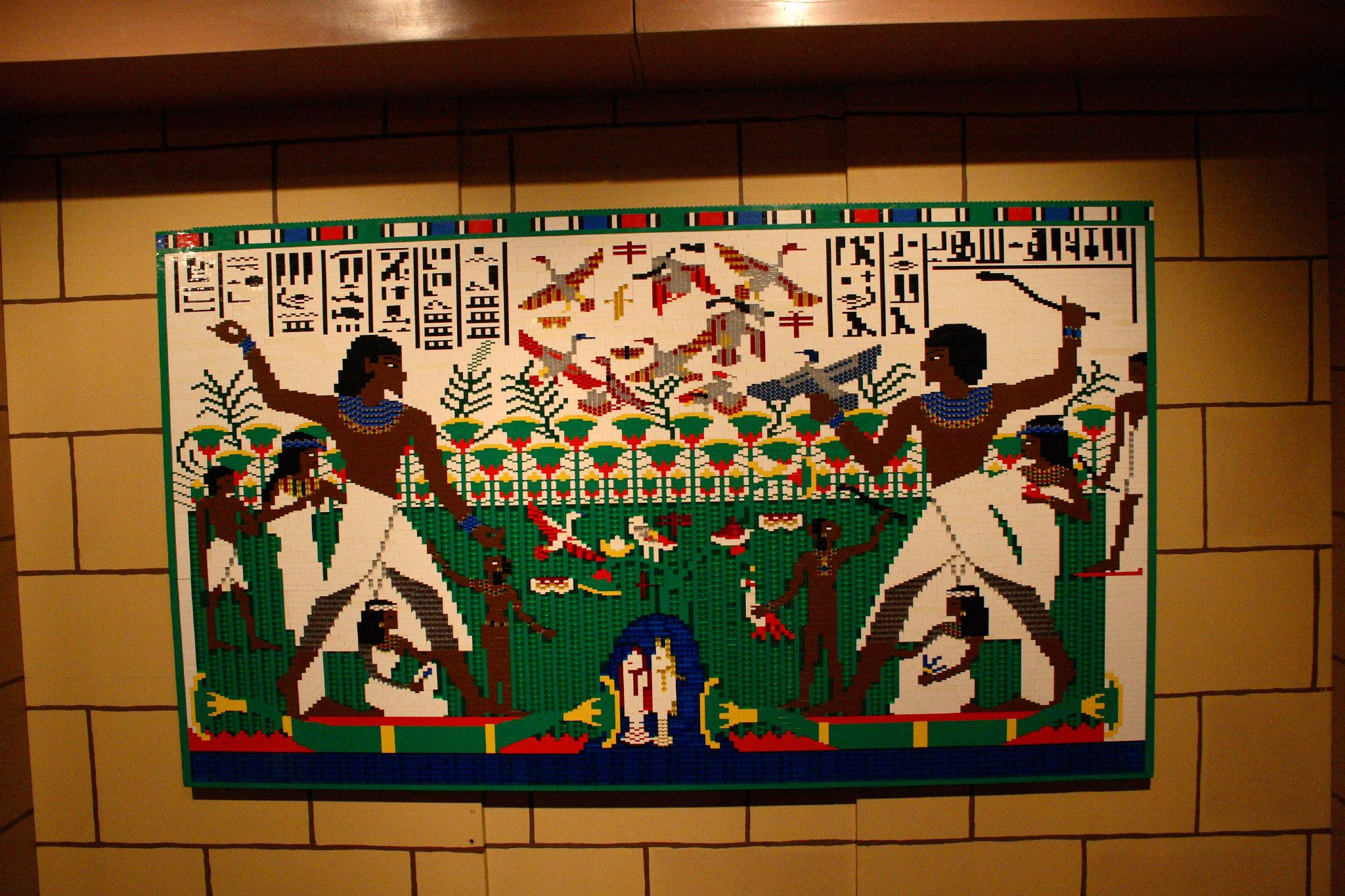
ancient Egyptian murals

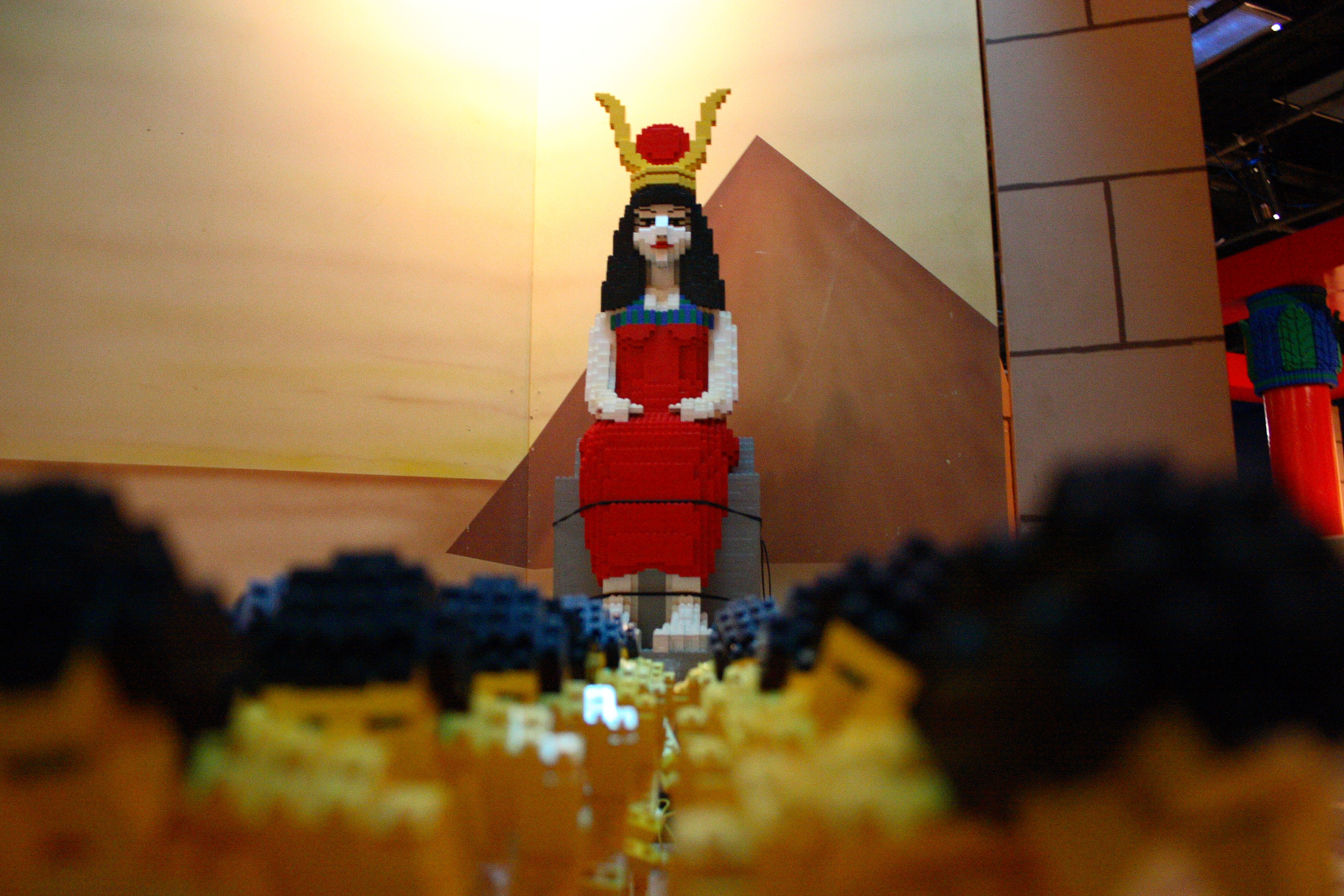
A group of free laborers transporting a colossal of the goddess Hathor (#I)

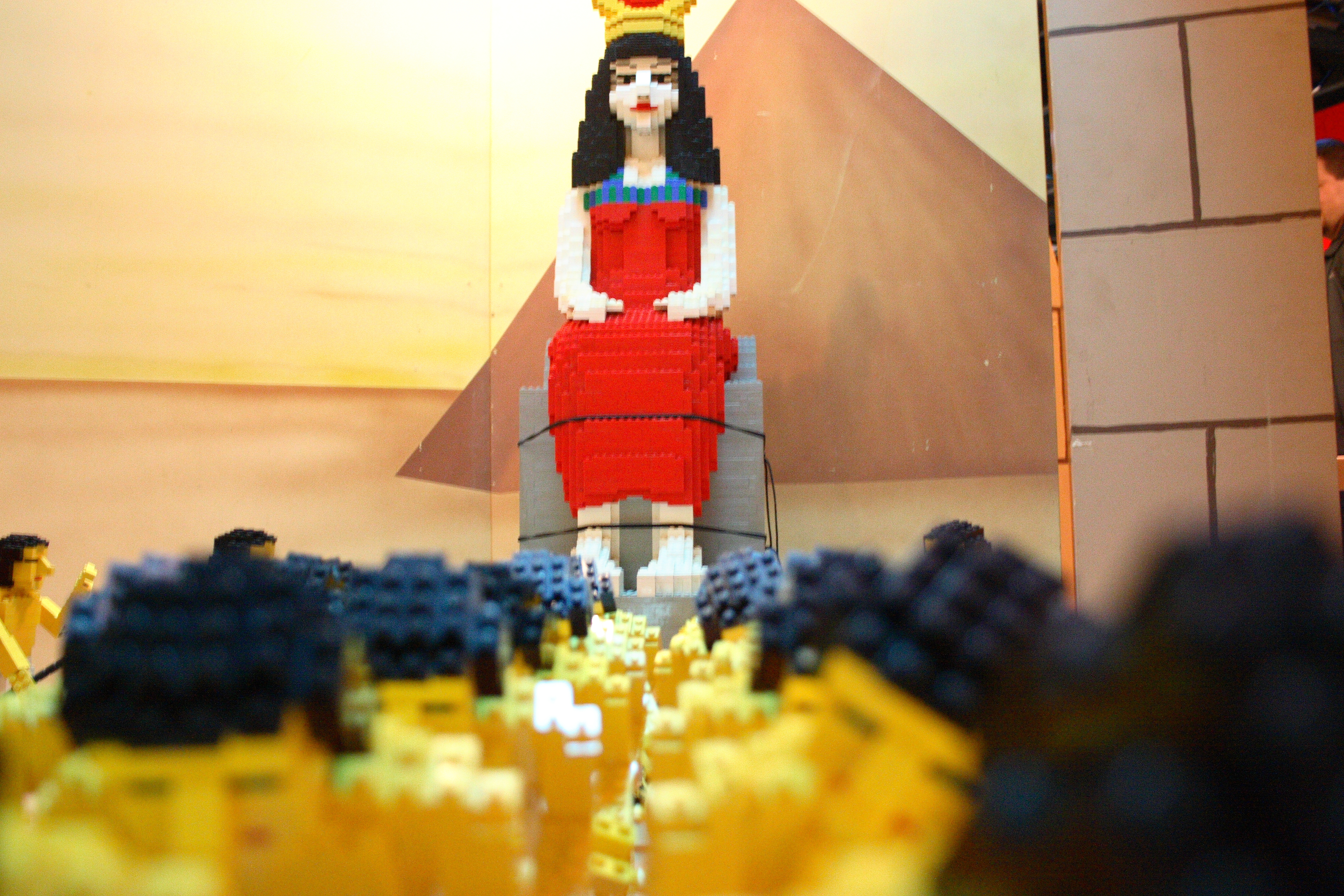
A group of free laborers transporting a colossal of the goddess Hathor (#II)

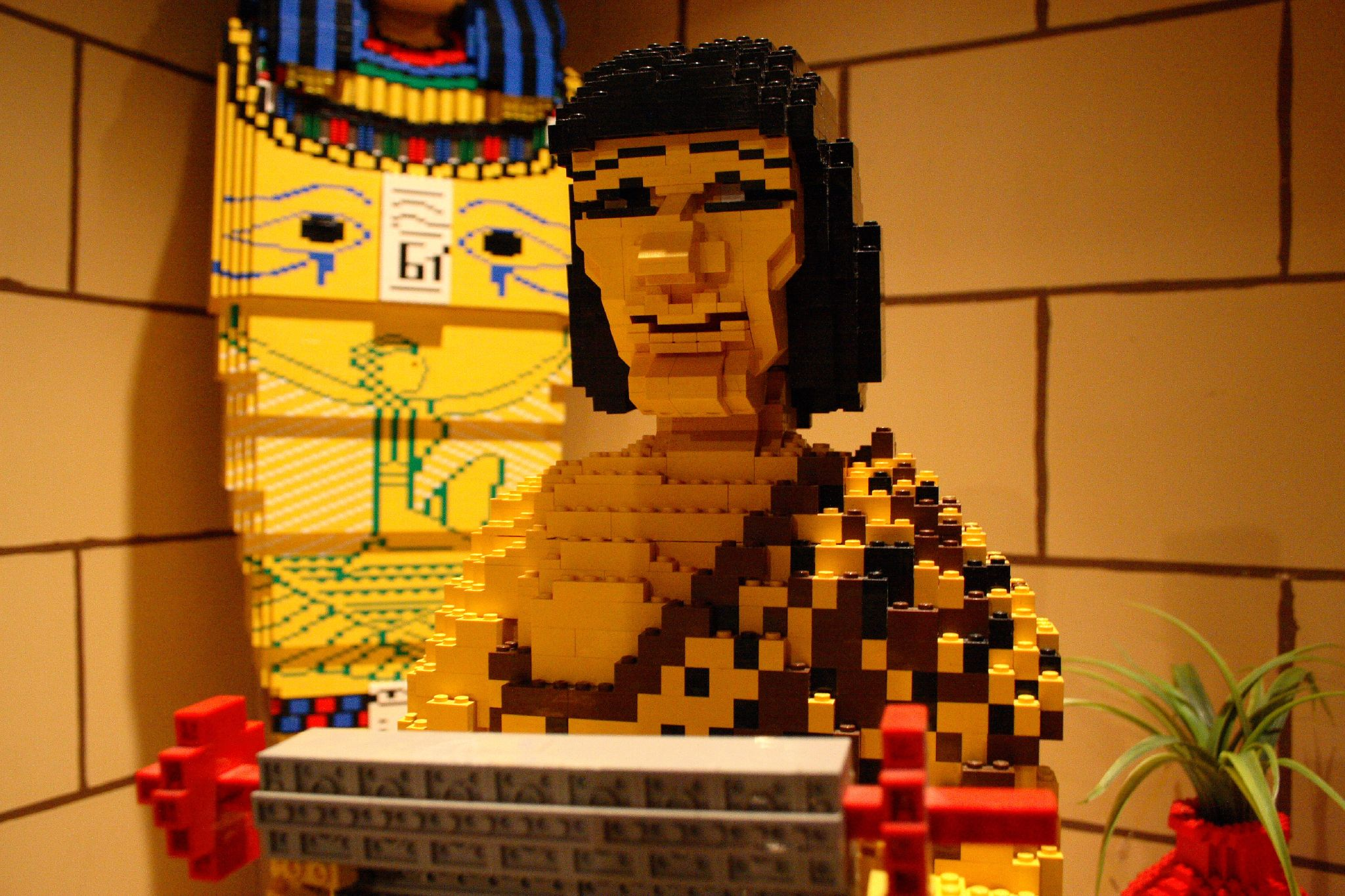
replica of a scribe

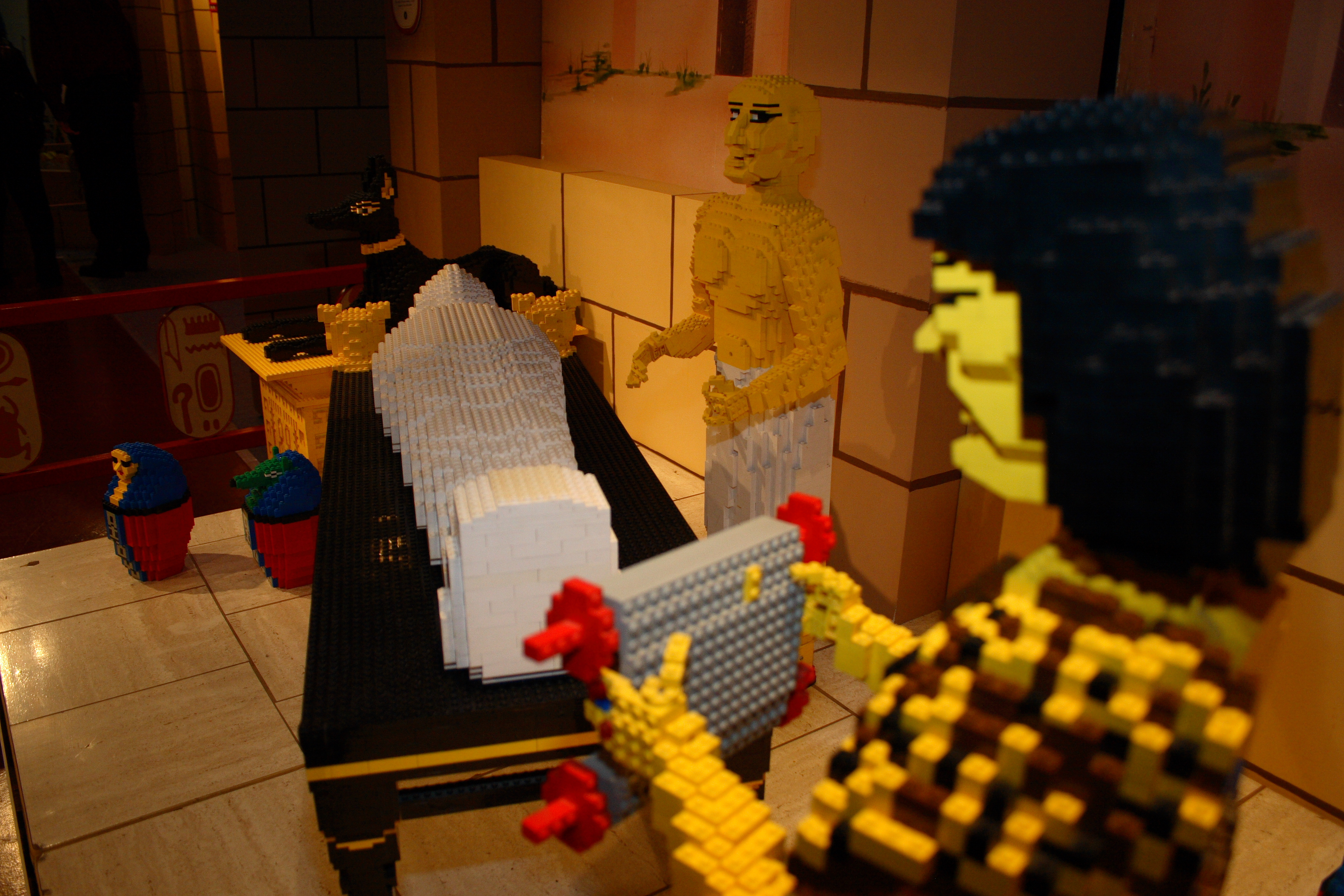
Scribe, and papyrus scroll, and mummy

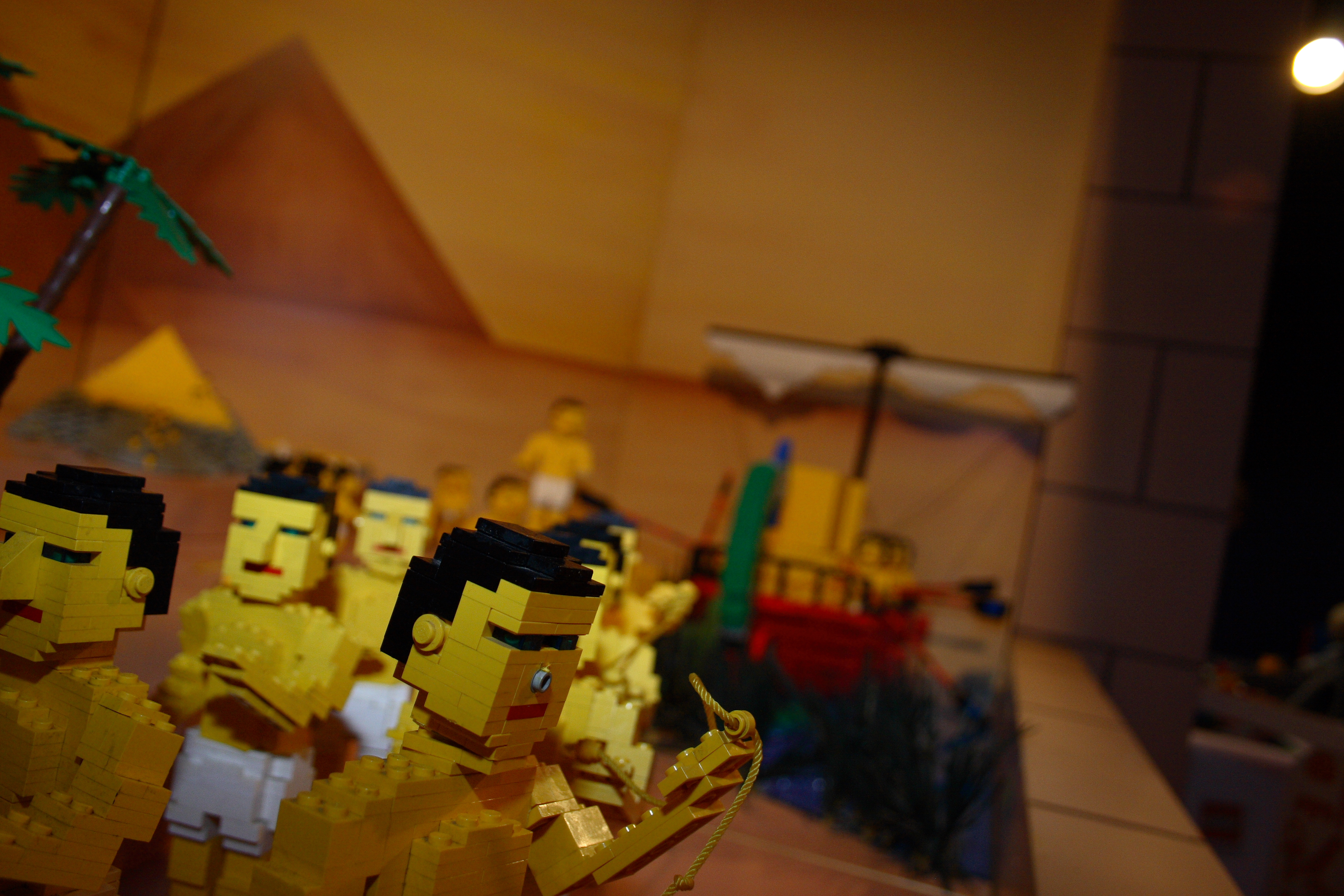
Salves, and boat, and the Nile

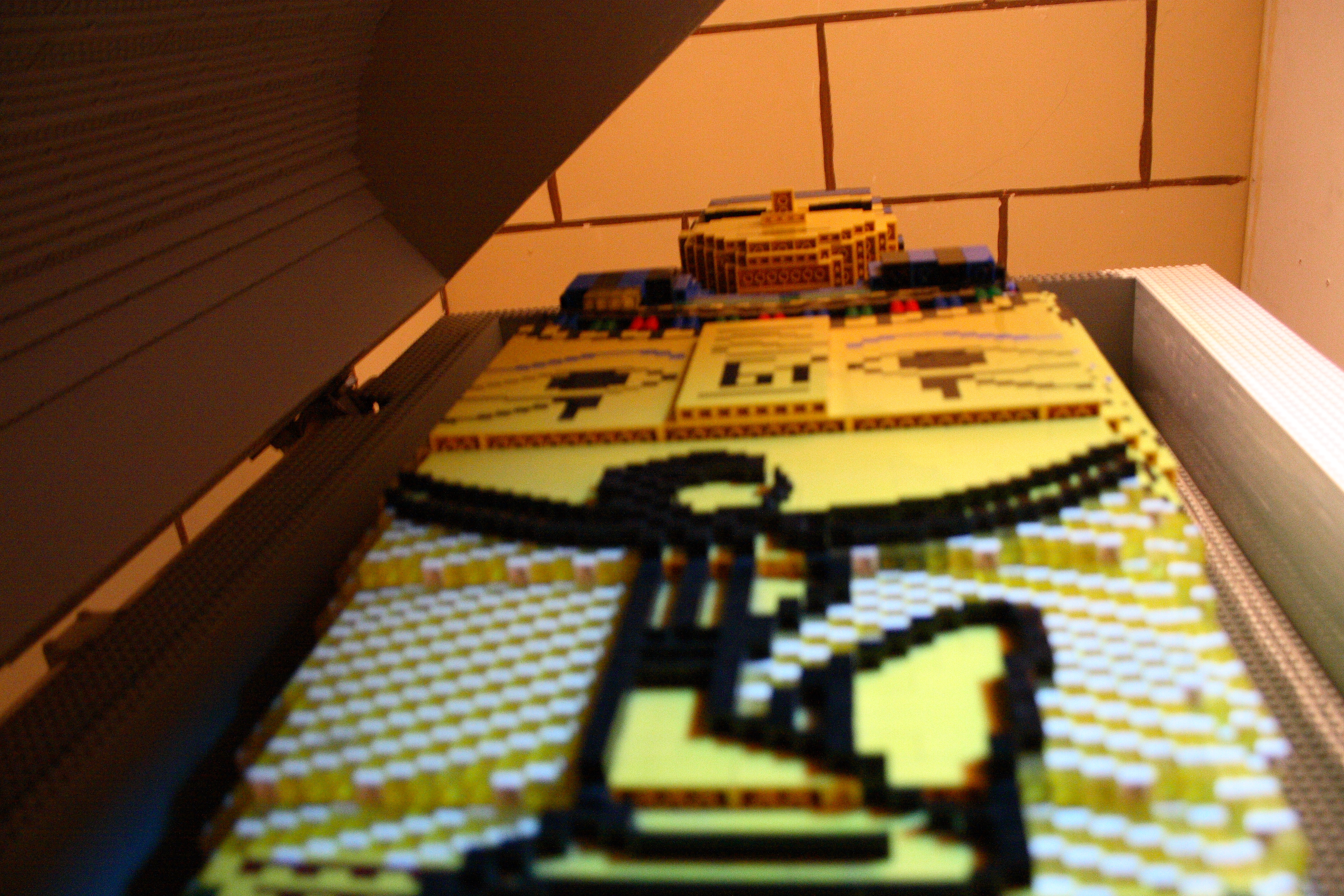
Sarcophagus

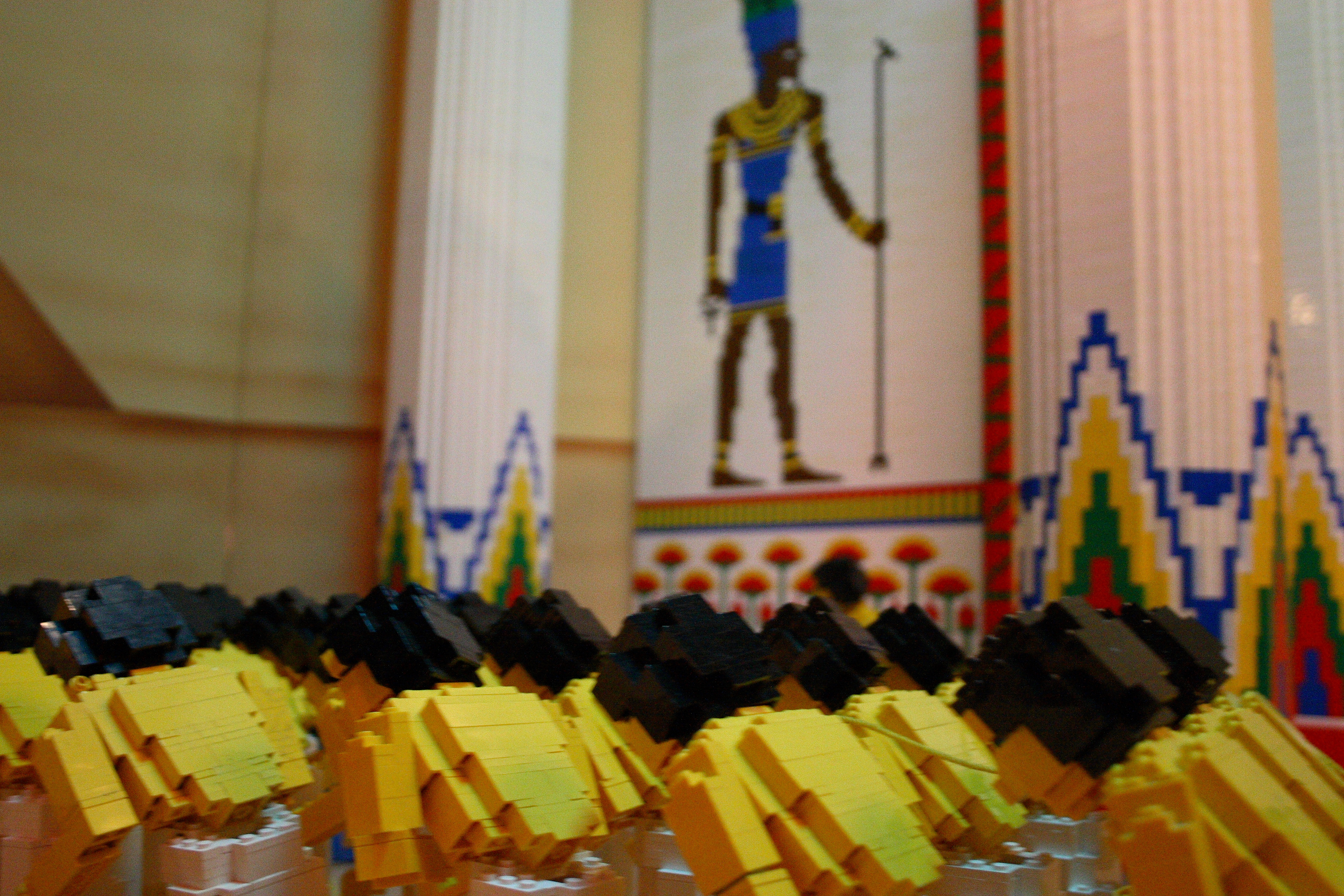
slaves bend

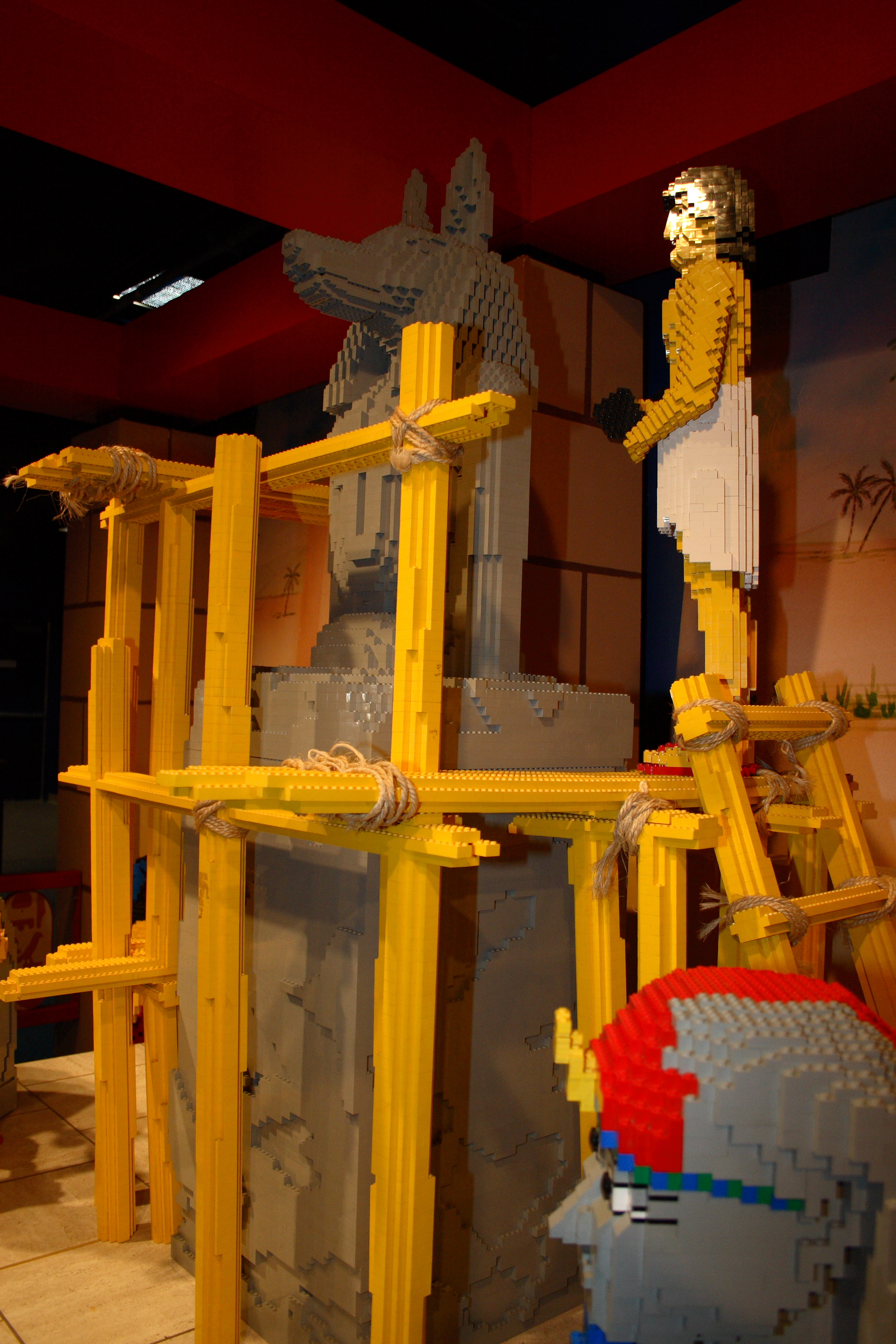
tailor of an Anubis statute

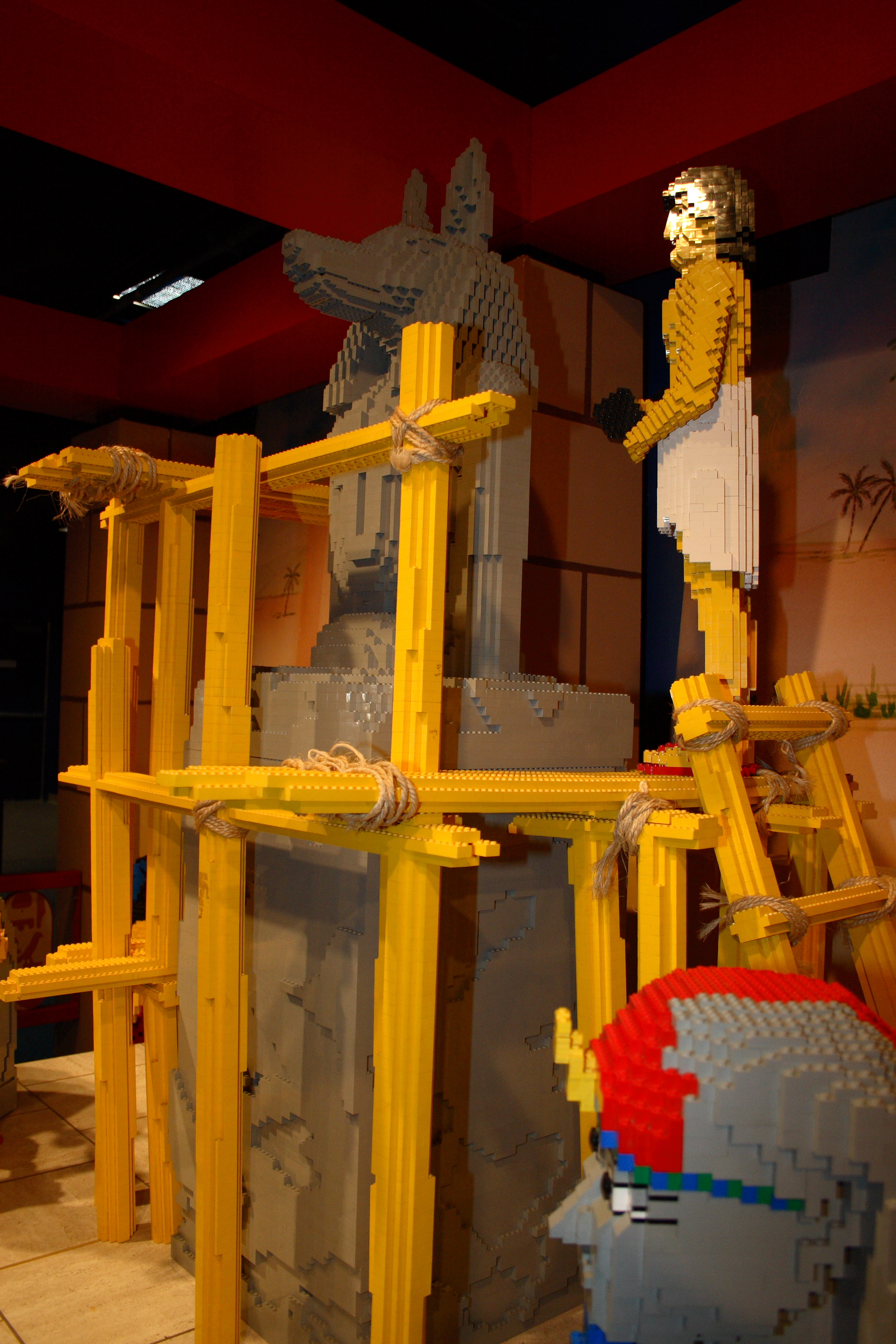
LEGO replica of Tutankhamun's mask

== See also ==
- List of museums in Saskatchewan
