= List of lieutenant governors of Saskatchewan =

The following is a list of the lieutenant governors of Saskatchewan. Though the present day office of the Lieutenant Governor in Saskatchewan came into being only upon the province's entry into Canadian Confederation in 1905, the post is a continuation from the first Governorship of the Northwest Territories in 1869.

== Lieutenant governors of Saskatchewan (1905–present) ==
| No. | Lieutenant Governor | Took office | Left office | Tenure | Monarch (reign) |
|---|---|---|---|---|---|
| 1 | Amédée E. Forget (1847–1923) | September 1, 1905 | May 6, 1910 | 5 years, 43 days | Edward VII (1905–1910) |
| 1 | Amédée E. Forget (1847–1923) | May 6, 1910 | October 14, 1910 | 5 years, 43 days | George V (1910–1936) |
| 2 | George W. Brown (1860–1919) | October 14, 1910 | October 18, 1915 | 5 years, 4 days | George V (1910–1936) |
| 3 | Sir; Richard Stuart Lake (1860–1950) | October 18, 1915 | February 18, 1921 | 5 years, 123 days | George V (1910–1936) |
| 4 | Henry William Newlands (1862–1954) | February 18, 1921 | March 31, 1931 | 10 years, 41 days | George V (1910–1936) |
| 5 | Hugh Edwin Munroe (1878–1947) | March 31, 1931 | January 20, 1936 | 5 years, 163 days | George V (1910–1936) |
| 5 | Hugh Edwin Munroe (1878–1947) | January 20, 1936 | September 10, 1936 | 5 years, 163 days | Edward VIII (1936) |
| 6 | Archibald Peter McNab (1864–1945) | September 10, 1936 | December 11, 1936 | 8 years, 170 days | Edward VIII (1936) |
| 6 | Archibald Peter McNab (1864–1945) | December 11, 1936 | February 27, 1945 | 8 years, 170 days | George VI (1936–1952) |
| 7 | Thomas Miller (1876–1945) | February 27, 1945 | June 20, 1945 (Note: Died in office.) | 113 days | George VI (1936–1952) |
| 8 | Reginald John Marsden Parker (1881–1948) | June 22, 1945 | March 23, 1948 | 2 years, 275 days | George VI (1936–1952) |
| 9 | John Michael Uhrich (1877–1951) | March 23, 1948 | June 15, 1951 | 3 years, 84 days | George VI (1936–1952) |
| 10 | William John Patterson (1886–1976) | June 15, 1951 | February 6, 1952 | 6 years, 233 days | George VI (1936–1952) |
| 10 | William John Patterson (1886–1976) | February 6, 1952 | February 3, 1958 | 6 years, 233 days | Elizabeth II (1952–2022) |
| 11 | Frank Lindsay Bastedo (1886–1973) | February 3, 1958 | March 1, 1963 | 5 years, 26 days | Elizabeth II (1952–2022) |
| 12 | Robert Hanbidge (1891–1974) | March 1, 1963 | February 2, 1970 | 6 years, 338 days | Elizabeth II (1952–2022) |
| 13 | Stephen Worobetz (1914–2006) | February 2, 1970 | February 29, 1976 | 6 years, 27 days | Elizabeth II (1952–2022) |
| 14 | George Porteous (1903–1978) | March 3, 1976 | February 6, 1978 | 1 year, 340 days | Elizabeth II (1952–2022) |
| 15 | Irwin McIntosh (1926–1988) | February 22, 1978 | July 6, 1983 | 5 years, 134 days | Elizabeth II (1952–2022) |
| 16 | Frederick Johnson (1917–1993) | July 6, 1983 | September 7, 1988 | 5 years, 63 days | Elizabeth II (1952–2022) |
| 17 | Sylvia Fedoruk (1927–2012) | September 7, 1988 | May 31, 1994 | 5 years, 266 days | Elizabeth II (1952–2022) |
| 18 | Jack Wiebe (1936–2007) | May 31, 1994 | February 21, 2000 | 5 years, 266 days | Elizabeth II (1952–2022) |
| 19 | Lynda Haverstock (born 1948) | February 21, 2000 | August 1, 2006 | 6 years, 161 days | Elizabeth II (1952–2022) |
| 20 | Gordon Barnhart (born 1945) | August 1, 2006 | March 22, 2012 | 5 years, 234 days | Elizabeth II (1952–2022) |
| 21 | Vaughn Solomon Schofield (1943–2026) | March 22, 2012 | March 21, 2018 | 5 years, 364 days | Elizabeth II (1952–2022) |
| 22 | W. Thomas Molloy (1940–2019) | March 21, 2018 | July 2, 2019 | 1 year, 103 days | Elizabeth II (1952–2022) |
| 23 | Russell Mirasty (born 1956/7) | July 18, 2019 | September 8, 2022 | 5 years, 197 days | Elizabeth II (1952–2022) |
| 23 | Russell Mirasty (born 1956/7) | September 8, 2022 | January 31, 2025 | 5 years, 197 days | Charles III (2022–present) |
| 24 | Bernadette McIntyre (born 1958) | January 31, 2025 | Incumbent | 1 year, 74 days | Charles III (2022–present) |

== See also ==
- Office-holders of Canada
- Canadian incumbents by year
