= Lying in state =

Public funerary custom

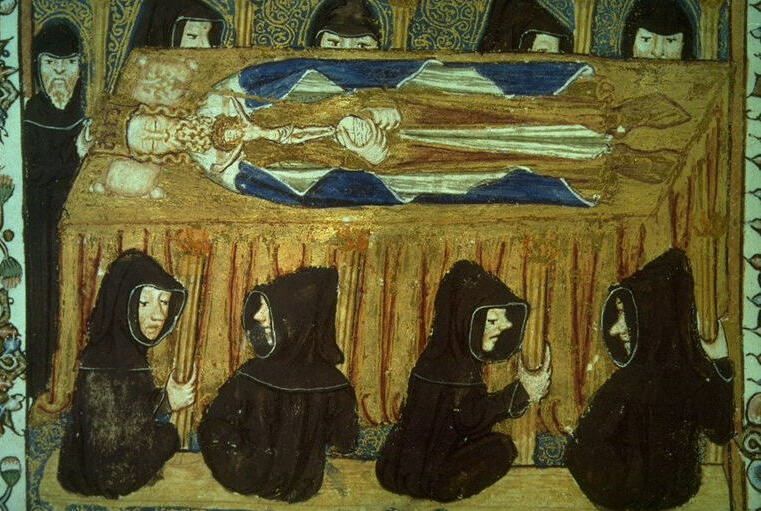
Philip IV of France lying in state

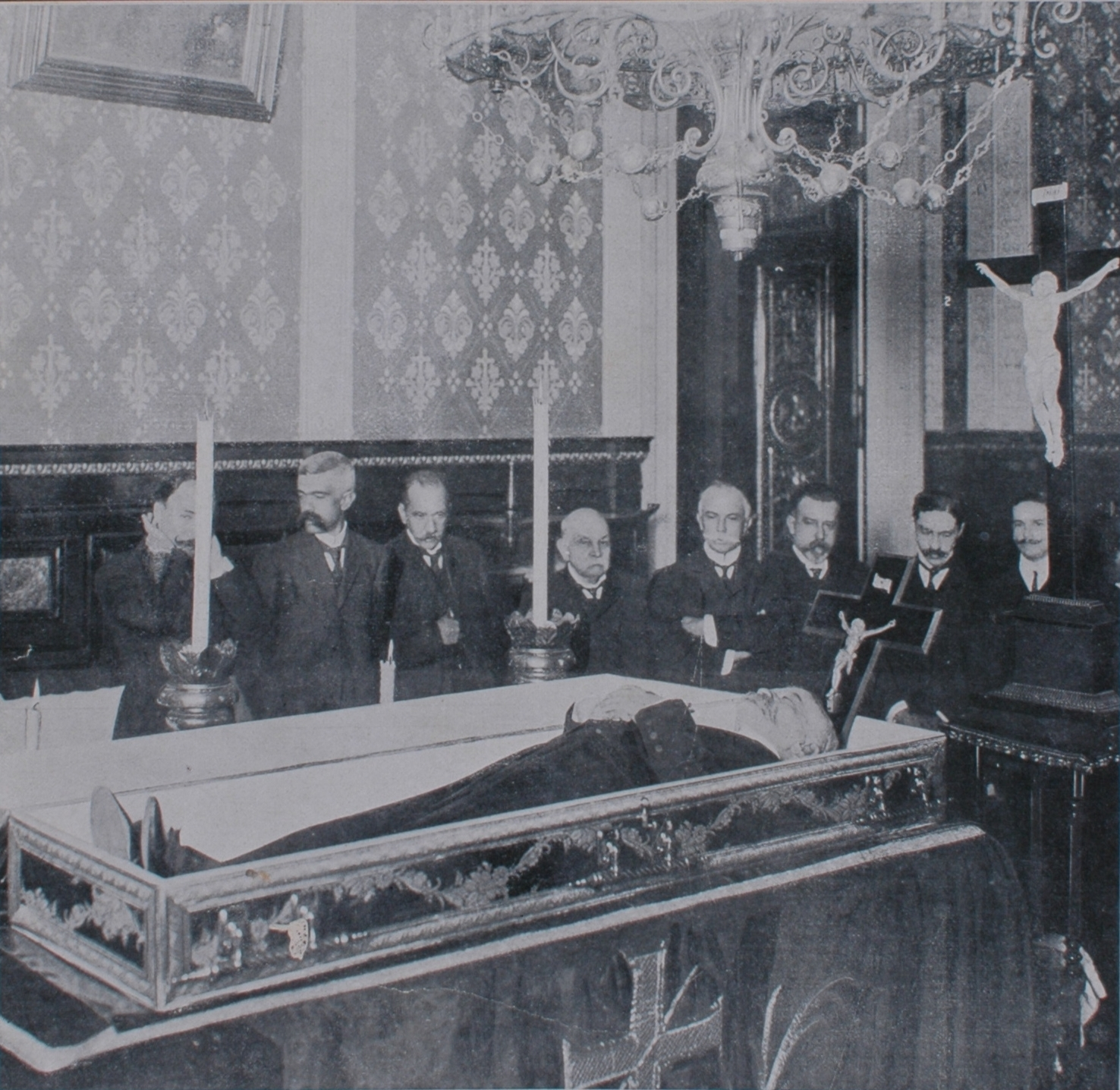
Brazilian president Afonso Pena lying in state in the Catete Palace, 1909

Lying in state is the tradition in which the body of a deceased official, such as a head of state, is placed in a state building, either outside or inside a coffin, to allow the public to pay their respects. It traditionally takes place in a major government building of a country, state, or city. While the practice differs among countries, in the United States, a viewing in a location other than a government building, such as a church, may be referred to as lying in repose. These rituals are in effect a more formal and public wake or funeral viewing. Lying in state may precede a state funeral, or it may be the public honor preceding a private funeral.

== Canada ==
In Canada, official lying in state is a part of a state funeral, an honour generally reserved for former governors general and former prime ministers. It is held in the Centre Block of Parliament Hill, in the national capital, Ottawa, Ontario. Ex-governors general lie in state in the Senate Chamber while former prime ministers lie in the Hall of Honour. During the period of lying in state, the caskets are flanked at each corner by a Guard of honour, composed of four members drawn from the Canadian Forces and Royal Canadian Mounted Police, as well as members of the Governor General's Foot Guards for former governors general, and guards from the parliamentary security forces for former prime ministers. Guards stand at each corner with heads bowed and weapons inverted (resting on Arms reversed) with their backs turned towards the casket.

Provinces may also mount state funerals and have a lying in state for a distinguished former resident. For instance, Maurice Richard, nationally known hockey player, was given a state funeral by the province of Quebec when he died in 2000; his coffin lay in state at the Molson Centre. This process was repeated for fellow Canadiens players Jean Béliveau in December 2014 and Guy Lafleur in May 2022.

Upon his death in October 2012, 24th lieutenant governor of Ontario and former member of parliament Lincoln Alexander received only the second provincial state funeral in the province. Ontario staged its first state funeral in October 1982 for former premier John Robarts.

Alexander lay in state in the Ontario Legislative Building in Toronto then in repose in Hamilton City Hall, his hometown. The service was held in Hamilton Place. During the procession from city hall, the casket was escorted by mounted police officers, marching police, firefighters and military and a massed pipe band representing several police and fire services.

On 2 July 2019, Lieutenant Governor of Saskatchewan W. Thomas Molloy died. He was installed as the 22nd lieutenant governor on 21 March 2018, and approximately a year later, diagnosed with pancreatic cancer. His state funeral service was held at Merlis Belsher Place on the campus of the University of Saskatchewan. Malloy had earlier served as chancellor of the university. Members of the public were able to sign books of condolence at the Saskatchewan Legislative Building and Government House in Regina and city hall in Saskatoon.

Premier Scott Moe stated that flags in the province would fly at half-mast until sunset on the day of Malloy's funeral, which was later scheduled for 13 July. During the service, a detail of Royal Canadian Mounted Police guarded the casket and following, members of 15 Wing Moose Jaw from the Royal Canadian Air Force flew over Merlis Belsher Place.

Jocelyne Roy-Vienneau, Lieutenant Governor of New Brunswick, died 2 August 2019, after holding office since 23 October 2014. She received a state funeral 8 August 2019 and the flag on the Peace Tower of the Parliament Buildings flew at half-mast from 6 August through 8 August.

Municipalities may offer civic funerals to prominent deceased current or former politicians.

== North Korea ==
In North Korea, the body of the late leader Kim Jong Il was embalmed and displayed in a glass coffin surrounded with red flowers at the Kumsusan Palace of the Sun in Pyongyang prior to his funeral, which began and ended at the palace. An honour guard armed with AK-47s was present. Kim's father Kim Il Sung, the founding president, was also embalmed, placed in a glass casket, and is on display elsewhere in the palace.

== Soviet Union ==
During the time of the Soviet Union (1917–1991), the state funerals of the most senior political and military leaders, such as Vladimir Lenin, Joseph Stalin, Leonid Brezhnev, Yuri Andropov, and Konstantin Chernenko all followed the same basic outline. They took place in Moscow, beginning with a public lying in state of the deceased in the House of the Unions, and ending with an interment at Red Square.

For the lying in state at the House of the Unions, the coffin would be placed on display in the Column Hall, which would be decorated by flowers, numerous red flags and other communist symbols. The mourners, which usually would be brought in by the thousands, shuffled up a marble staircase beneath chandeliers draped in black gauze. On the stage at the left side of the Column Hall, a full orchestra in black tailcoats played classical music. The deceased's embalmed body, dressed in a black suit, white shirt and a tie, was displayed in an open coffin on a catafalque banked with carnations, red roses and tulips, facing the queue of mourners. A small guard of honour would be in attendance in the background. At the right side of the hall, seats were placed for guests of honour, with the front row reserved for the dead leader's family.

On the day of the funeral, a military funeral parade would take place during which the coffin would be conveyed from the House of the Unions to Red Square where burial would take place. Lenin and Stalin were placed inside the Lenin Mausoleum, while Brezhnev, Andropov, and Chernenko were interred in individual graves in the Kremlin Wall Necropolis.

== Singapore ==
At state funerals in Singapore, the state flag is draped over the coffin. The vigil guard may be deployed during the public lying in state of the deceased person at Parliament House. The deployment of the vigil guard is the highest form of respect accorded by the nation to the deceased.

Similar to British traditions, the vigil guard is composed of groups of five commissioned officers from the Singapore Armed Forces (SAF) and Singapore Police Force (SPF) who stand guard around the clock in shifts of 30 minutes. Four of the five officers stand facing outward at each of the four corners of the coffin, while the fifth and most senior stands in front and faces inward. Their heads are bowed and their ceremonial swords are inverted.

Vigil guards were stationed at the public lying in state of Goh Keng Swee in May 2010, Lee Kuan Yew in March 2015, and S. R. Nathan in August 2016.

== South Africa ==
Nelson Mandela was the first democratically elected president to lie in state in South Africa. The event took place at the Union Buildings in Pretoria, the same site where he was inaugurated as the president of South Africa on 10 May 1994. Mandela lay in state from 11 December through 13 December 2013 with thousands of South Africans filing past the coffin before it was flown to Mthatha where Mandela was buried on 15 December 2013 in nearby Qunu in the Eastern Cape.

From 30 December to 31 December 2021, revered anti-apartheid fighter Archbishop Desmond Tutu lay in state at St. George's Cathedral in Cape Town prior to his funeral being held at the same location on 1 January 2022.

== United Kingdom ==
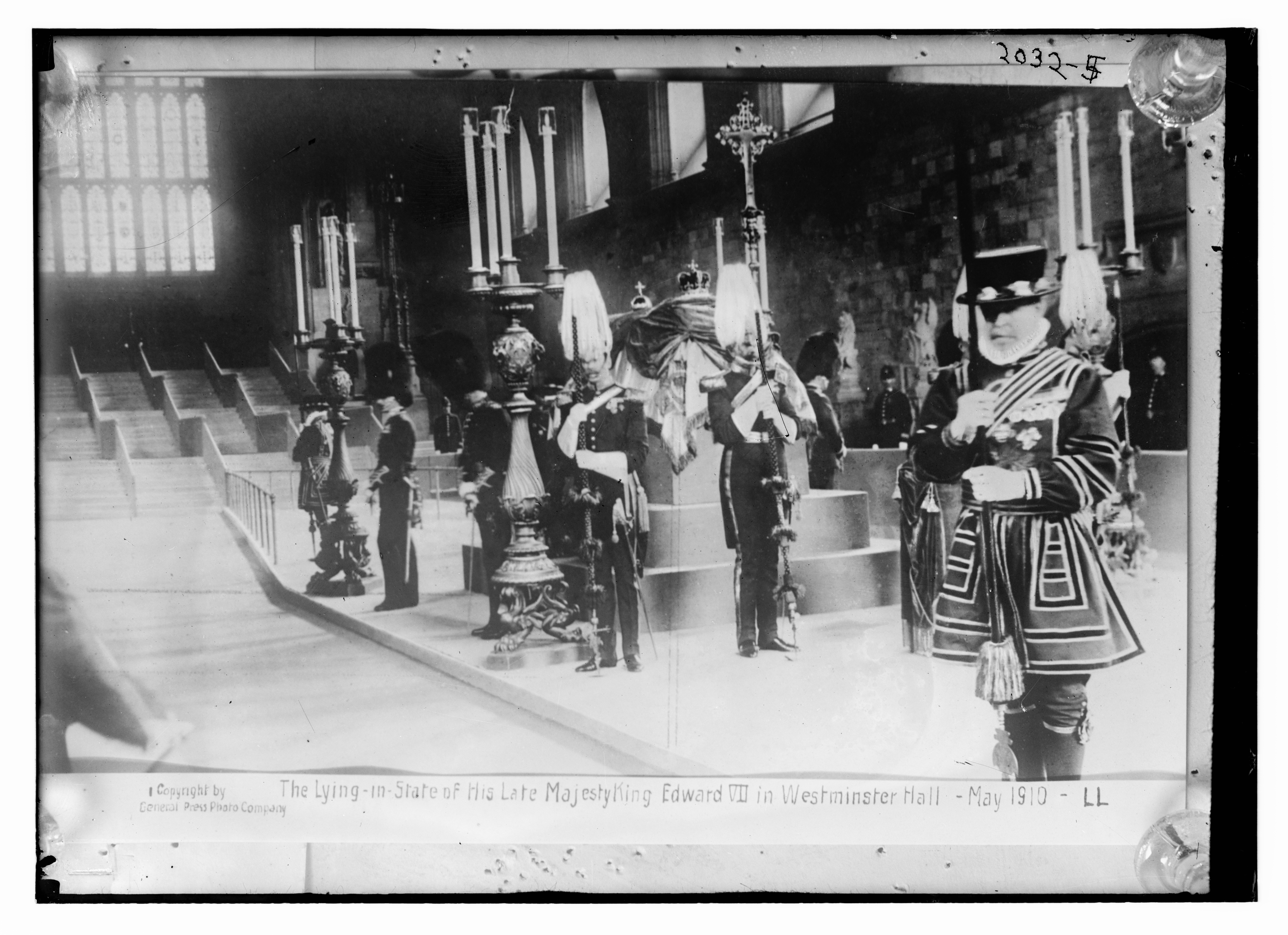
The lying in state of King Edward VII in Westminster Hall, May 1910

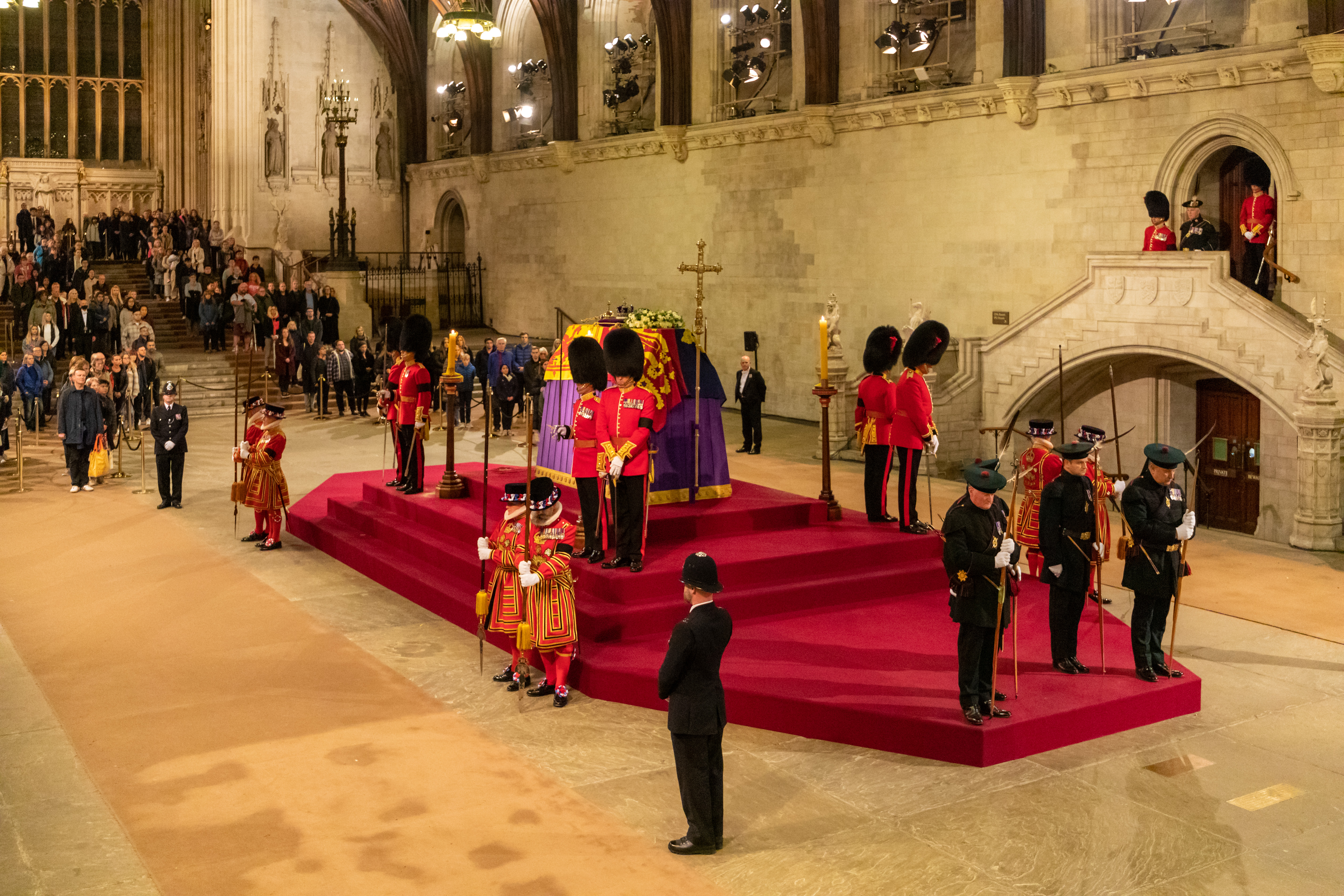
The lying in state of Queen Elizabeth II in Westminster Hall, September 2022

In state and ceremonial funerals in the United Kingdom, lying in state traditionally takes place in Westminster Hall. The body is placed in a closed coffin on a catafalque and is guarded, around the clock, by detachments from the following units:

- Sovereign's Bodyguard
  - His Majesty's Bodyguard of the Honourable Corps of Gentlemen-at-Arms
  - The King's Bodyguard of the Yeomen of the Guard
  - The Royal Company of Archers, The King's Bodyguard for Scotland
- Household Division
  - Household Cavalry
    - The Life Guards
    - The Blues and Royals (Royal Horse Guards and 1st Dragoons)
  - Foot Guards
    - Grenadier Guards
    - Coldstream Guards
    - Scots Guards
    - Irish Guards
    - Welsh Guards

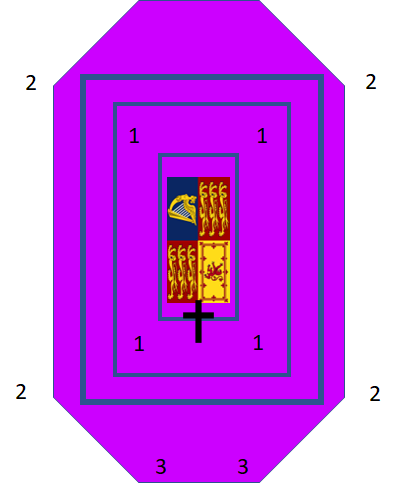
Diagram showing the positions of the guards during the lying in state prior to a State Funeral – the cross is at the head of the coffin: 1: Household Cavalry or Foot Guards 2: Yeomen of the Guard 3: Gentlemen-at-Arms or Royal Company of Archers

There are differences between lying in state at a State Funeral, and that of a Ceremonial Funeral. At a State Funeral, the guard detachment consists of ten members, with six drawn from the Sovereign's Bodyguard and four from the Household Division. The four members of the Household Division, all of whom are officers, and who are drawn either from the two regiments of the Household Cavalry (one pair from each), or one of the Foot Guards regiments, form the 'Inner Guard'; they stand one each corner of the catafalque next to the coffin. The six members of the Sovereign's Bodyguard consist of four from the Yeomen of the Guard, and two from either the Gentlemen-at-Arms or the Royal Company of Archers, and form the 'Outer Guard'. The Yeomen of the Guard take position at the corners of the dais on which the catafalque is mounted, outside the officers from the Household Division, while the final two take position on the dais at the foot of the coffin.

Each detachment stands vigil for twenty minutes, facing out from the coffin with heads bowed and weapons inverted. The Yeomen of the Guard maintain a constant presence throughout the period of lying in state, while the other units rotate every six hours. At a Ceremonial Funeral, such as that of Queen Elizabeth the Queen Mother, only the Inner Guard stands vigil, with detachments of four from each of the ten named units at their post for twenty minutes, and units rotating every six hours.

On three occasions, the guard has been mounted by four members of the royal family. At the lying in state of King George V in 1936, the guard was mounted by his four sons King Edward VIII, the Duke of York (future George VI), the Duke of Gloucester and the Duke of Kent. For Queen Elizabeth the Queen Mother's lying-in-state in 2002, the guard was mounted by her four grandsons, the Prince of Wales (future Charles III), the Duke of York, the Earl of Wessex, and Viscount Linley. All Queen Elizabeth II's children took guard at 19:40 BST on 12 September 2022 at the lying-in-repose at St Giles' Cathedral, Edinburgh. During this vigil, Anne, Princess Royal became the first woman ever to stand guard. As part of the late Queen's lying in state in London, at 19:30 BST on 16 September 2022, her four children stood vigil for the second time. The Queen's eight grandchildren held a vigil the following day on 17 September 2022. On the same day, the UK's service chiefs – Admiral Sir Tony Radakin (Chief of the Defence Staff), Admiral Sir Ben Key (First Sea Lord and Chief of the Naval Staff), General Sir Patrick Sanders (Chief of the General Staff) and Air Chief Marshal Sir Michael Wigston (Chief of the Air Staff) – stood guard over the catafalque for 20 minutes in place of four officers from the foot guards.

The tradition of lying in state in the United Kingdom dates to the Stuart sovereigns in the seventeenth century. The first British monarch to lie in state in Westminster Hall was King Edward VII in 1910, apparently following William Gladstone in 1898. Queen Victoria requested that she should not lie in state but after her death at Osborne House on the Isle of Wight was given a semi-private lying in state for family and servants to pay their respects.

== United States ==
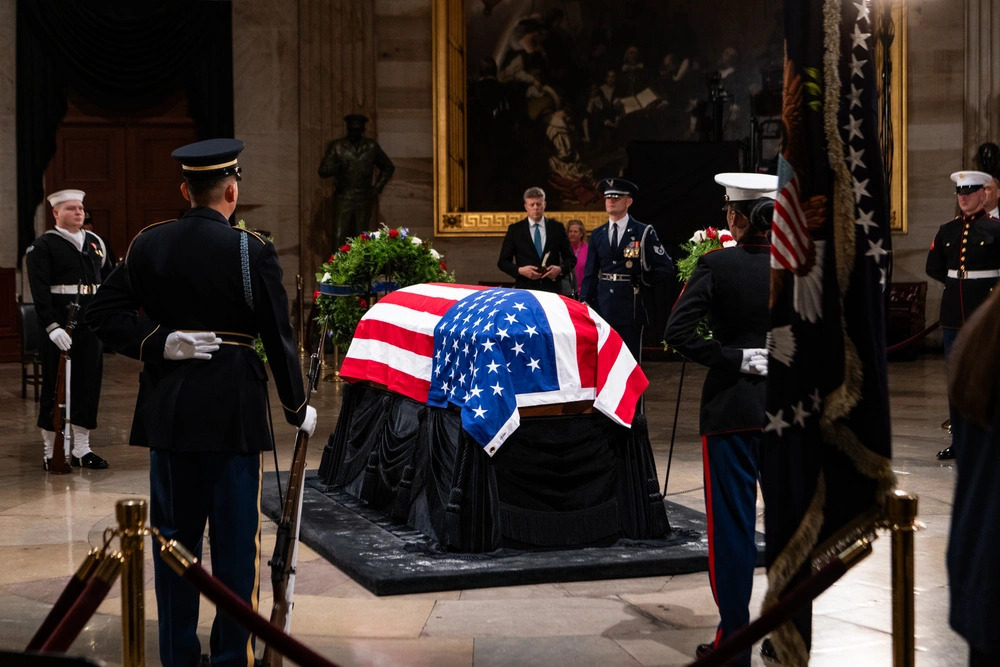
President Jimmy Carter lying in state in the Capitol rotunda before his state funeral, 7 January 2025

Lying in state in the United States is the rare honour either authorized by a congressional resolution or approved by the congressional leadership, when permission is granted by survivors, to a deceased member of government (or former member) whereby their remains are placed in the rotunda of the United States Capitol in Washington, D.C. for public viewing. The casket is guarded by members of the six branches of the United States armed forces. By regulation and custom, only presidents, military commanders, justices of the Supreme Court, and members of Congress are granted the honour of lying in state.

It differs from lying in honour in that individuals lying in state have guards of honour representing each branch of the U.S. Armed Forces, while individuals lying in honour have the U.S. Capitol Police as civilian guards of honour. Six Americans have lain in honour, beginning in 1998. In 2005, Rosa Parks became the first woman to lie in honour in the United States Capitol.

Except for presidents and former presidents, the honour is not automatic. Not all those entitled to the honour have it accepted by their survivors. The first leader to receive this honour was Henry Clay, former Speaker of the House of Representatives, when he died in 1852. Since then, the honour has been extended to 36 people, including 12 presidents and four unknown soldiers, representing U.S. service members who have died without their remains being identified. Harry Truman, Richard Nixon and their families declined services at the Capitol. To date, most of those who have lain in state have done so upon the catafalque constructed for the funeral of Abraham Lincoln. Those who have lain in honour have been borne on other biers.

=== States and cities ===
Some U.S. states and cities extend similar honours.

==== Alabama ====
Because of his role in the Selma to Montgomery marches during the civil rights movement, Georgia based U.S. Congress John Lewis, who was also originally a native of Alabama, would lie in state for one day in the Alabama Capitol in Montgomery on 26 July 2020.

==== Arizona ====
Upon his death in August 2018, U.S. Senator John McCain lay in state at the State Capitol of his home state of Arizona before receiving the same honour in the U.S. Capitol two days later.

==== California ====
After a memorial service outside the Polk Street entrance of San Francisco City Hall on 29 November 1978, Mayor George Moscone and city Supervisor Harvey Milk lay in state in the Rotunda until 30 November, after their assassination by former Supervisor Dan White. The chamber was also filled with more than 400 floral tributes to the two men.

In San Francisco, Mayor Ed Lee lay in state in the Rotunda of San Francisco City Hall after his death in office on 12 December 2017. Senator Dianne Feinstein, who served as San Francisco mayor from 1978 to 1988, also lay in state in the rotunda on 4 October 2023, prior to a funeral service the following day.

==== Georgia ====
On 29 July 2020, U.S. Representative John Lewis received similar honours from his home state of Georgia and also was the first African American member of Congress to lie in state in the Capitol Rotunda at the Georgia Capitol in Atlanta.

==== Hawaii ====
Eight people have lain in state at the Hawaii State Capitol, among which include former Governor John A. Burns in 1975, U.S. Senator Spark Matsunaga in 1990, famous Hawaiian singer Israel Kamakawiwoʻole upon his death in 1997, U.S. Representative Patsy Mink in 2002, former U.S. Senator Hiram Fong in 2004, Daniel Inouye, president pro tempore of the U.S. Senate, in 2012, and former U.S. Senator Daniel Akaka in 2018.

==== Illinois ====
On October 31 – November 1, 1893, Carter Harrison III, the slain mayor of Chicago, lay in state at the city hall of Chicago as part of his public funeral. Harrison had been assassinated days earlier.

In March 1902, John Peter Altgeld, who worked as an attorney in Chicago after serving as governor 1893–1897, died after suffering poor health most of his life. Altgeld lay in state in the Chicago Public Library after which he was buried in Graceland Cemetery on the city's north side.

On July 16, 1965, Adlai Stevenson II who served as Illinois Governor from 1949 to 1953 and Ambassador to the United Nations from January 1961 to July 1965, lay in state in the rotunda of the Illinois Capitol prior to his burial in Bloomington. Stevenson was also the Democratic candidate for the presidency in 1952 and 1956.

On 19 September 2025, Jim Edgar became only the second Illinois governor since 1900 to lie in state in the Illinois Capitol.

From 26 to 27 February 2026, Rev. Jesse Jackson, a renowned civil rights activist who was also a protege of Martin Luther King Jr., would in state at Rainbow/PUSH headquarters in Chicago.

==== Kentucky ====
Through 2022, 23 people have lain in state at the Kentucky Capitol building rotunda in Frankfort. This includes not only politicians, but also civilians. Kentucky-based Kentucky Fried Chicken (KFC) founder Colonel Harland Sanders would also be among those who received the honor of lying in state in the Kentucky Capitol Rotunda following his death in 1980. After his death in November 2022, former Kentucky governor and renowned restaurant business mogul John Y. Brown Jr. would also be among those who had the honor of lying in state at the Kentucky Capitol as well. Former Kentucky Governor Brereton C. Jones would lie in state at the Kentucky Capitol following his death in September 2023 as well. On 9 November 2025, former Kentucky governor Martha Layne Collins, the state's first female governor, would lie in state at the state capitol's Old State Capital building.

==== Michigan ====
In Michigan, only four governors have lain in state in the Capitol Building. The first was Frank Fitzgerald who died while in office, on 18 March 1939. Second was Chase Osborn who held office from 1911 to 1913 and died in April 1949. The two most recent were George W. Romney on 29 July 1995, who served as governor from 1963 to 1969. On 26 October 2010, the casket of Michigan's first governor Stevens T. Mason (1835–1840) lay in the capitol rotunda for a day before being re-interred in a monument in Detroit after the monument was renovated and relocated in Capitol Park, the site of Michigan's first capitol building.

Frank Murphy, who served as judge in Detroit Recorder's Court (1923–1930), Mayor of Detroit (1930–1933), Governor of Michigan (1937–1939) and Associate Justice of the Supreme Court (1940–1949), lay in state in Detroit City Hall in July 1949 prior to a Requiem Mass and burial in Harbor Beach, Michigan.

During funeral rites of civil rights icon Rosa Parks in Detroit in November 2005, she lay in repose at the Charles H. Wright Museum of African American History before services and burial. This followed similar arrangements in December 1997 for Mayor Coleman Young, the first African-American to hold that office.

Upon the deaths of singer-songwriter Aretha Franklin in August 2018 and former Congresswoman Barbara-Rose Collins in November 2021, both women were also honoured at the Wright Museum.

In November 2019, former Congressman John Conyers Jr. became the latest person to lie in state at the Wright Museum.

==== Minnesota ====
On 27 June 2025, former speaker of the Minnesota House of Representatives Melissa Hortman, lay in state with her husband Mark and dog Gilbert. They were all killed during the 2025 shootings of Minnesota legislators, which targeted Melissa Hortman. Hortman became the first woman to lie in state at the Minnesota State Capitol. Her husband became the first non-public official or veteran, and Gilbert the first animal, to receive the honor.

==== New Jersey ====
Following her death on 1 August 2023, Lieutenant Governor of New Jersey Sheila Oliver lay in state in the rotunda of the New Jersey State House and in the Essex County Courthouse prior to her public funeral at the Cathedral Basilica of the Sacred Heart on August 12, 2023.

==== New York ====
In New York, few have been afforded the honor of lying in state in the state capitol. Henry Clay and Abraham Lincoln both lay in state in the old capitol in 1852 and 1865, respectively, though both died in Washington, D.C. and neither had special ties to the state. In 1885, Ulysses S. Grant lay in the State Street lobby of the incomplete structure before his burial in New York City. A plaque currently marks the place where the casket was placed.

All three also lay in state in New York City Hall. Other notable figures afforded this honor in New York City include Civil War Generals Abner Doubleday and Joseph Hooker as well as newspaper publisher Horace Greeley. Two of the most recent figures to lie in state in city hall are city councilman James Davis in 2003 and former U.S. Rep Charles Rangel in 2025.

==== South Carolina ====
On 24 June 2015, South Carolina state senator and pastor Clementa Pinckney, who was killed in the shooting at which place at Pinckney's Emanuel African Methodist Episcopal Church, would lie in state at the South Carolina State House.

On 2 March 2026, Rev. Jesse Jackson, who was originally a native of South Carolina, would lie in state at the South Carolina State House, and the second African American to achieve this honor after Pinckney.

==== Texas ====
Former Governor Ann Richards would lie in state at the Texas State Capitol from 16 to 18 September 2006. Rep. Sheila Jackson Lee lay in state at Houston City Hall on 24 July 2024 after her death on 19 July. Lee was only the second person so honoured after noted heart surgeon Dr. Michael DeBakey. Former state rep, Houston mayor and U.S. Representative Sylvester Turner became the third person so honoured on 11 March 2025. Following ceremonies in Houston, Turner would also "lie in honor" at the Texas State Capitol from 13 to 14 March 2025; however, some sources have claimed that Turner did lay in state while at the Texas State Capitol during this time.

==== Washington ====
Upon her death in 1948, Belle Reeves, former state legislator and Washington's first female secretary of state, received the only state funeral ever held in the House Chamber of the Washington State Legislature.

== Vatican City ==
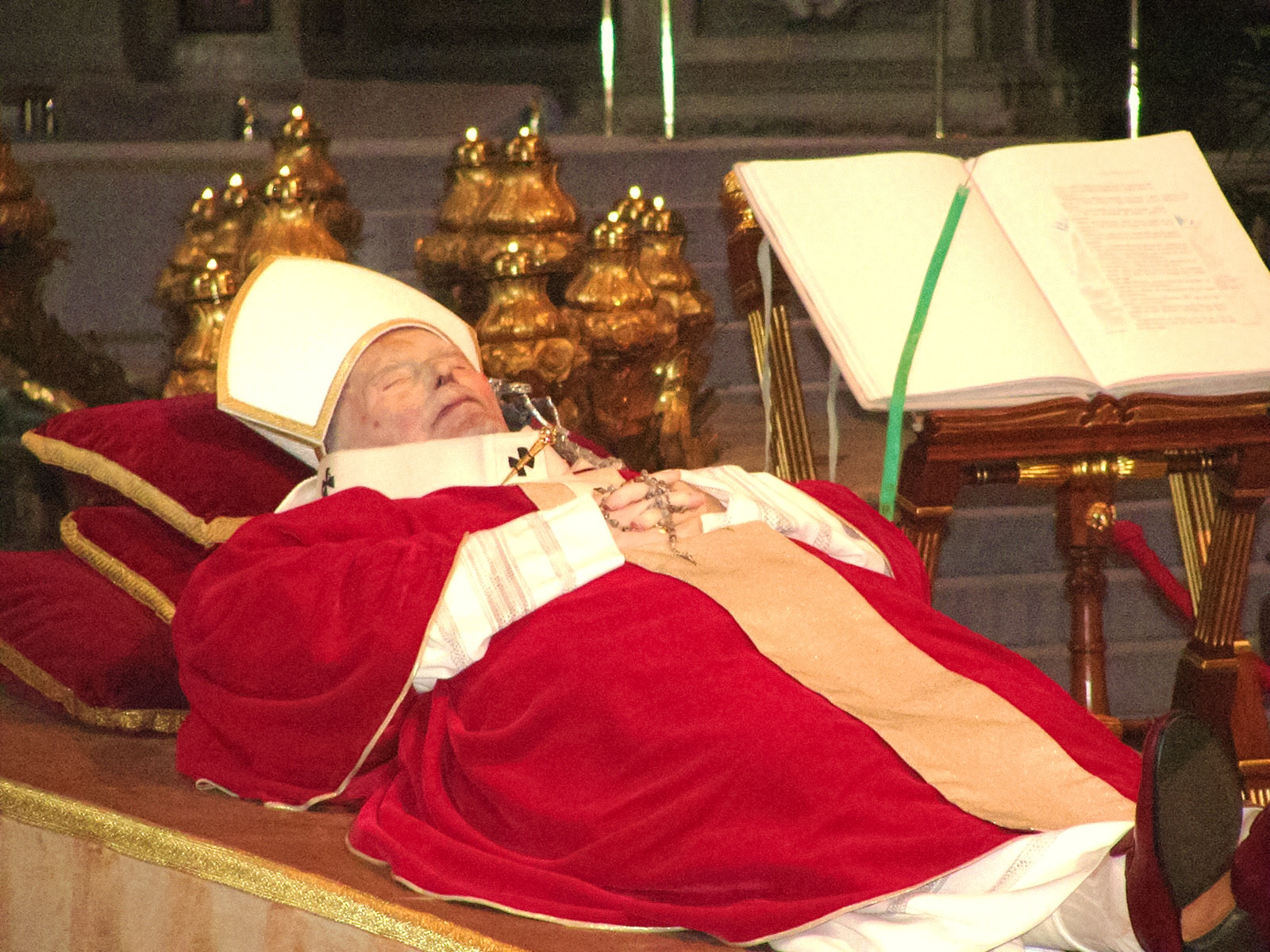
Pope John Paul II's body lying in state

Prior to 2000, when Ordo Exsequiarum Romani Pontificis was published under the pontificate of Pope John Paul II, the Vatican had no prescribed funeral rites for a deceased pope. Funerals were conducted based upon past practices with alterations according to instructions the pope wrote during his lifetime. The funerals of John Paul II and Benedict XVI followed these instructions. On the first day of lying in state, John Paul II laid in the chapel of the Apostolic Palace to allow members of the Papal household and Vatican officials to pay respects. However, Benedict XVI and Francis laid in state in the chapel of Domus Sanctae Marthae as it was their residence at the time of their deaths.

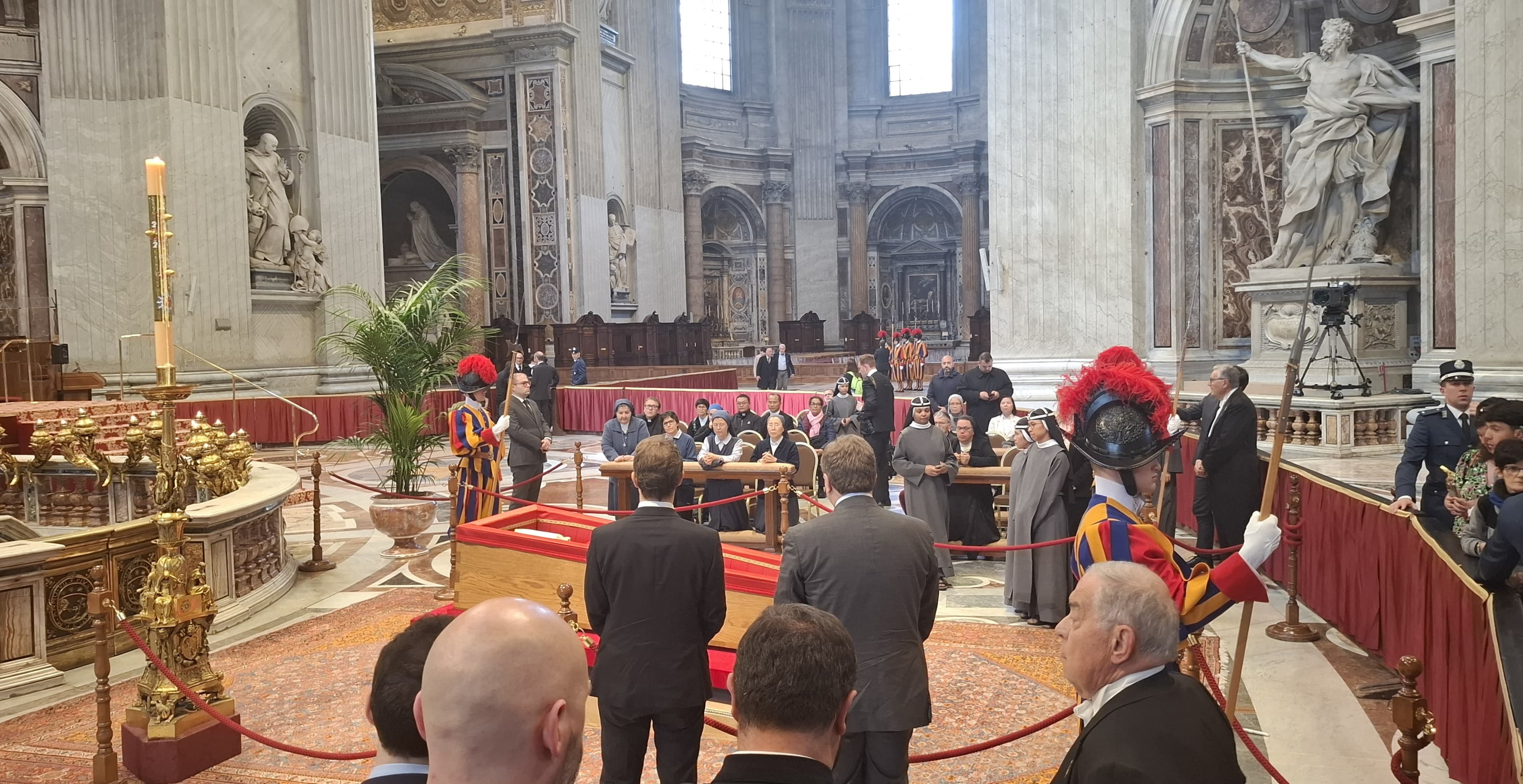
Lying in state ceremony for Pope Francis

After a Mass of Visitation the following morning, a procession moves the body to St. Peter's Basilica. It was placed on a catafalque so the public may pay respects for three days. The Dean of the College of Cardinals celebrates a Requiem Mass on the fourth day.

Pope Francis published a revised Ordo Exsequiarum Romani Pontificis in 2024 and his 2025 funeral followed the new rites. His revisions dispensed with the large catafalque in the basilica and his body lay in an open coffin on a low platform. The coffin itself differed from those of his predecessors who were buried in a three-part coffin of cypress, lead and oak. Per his wishes, Francis was placed in a simple wooden coffin lined with zinc.

An earlier revision that both editions incorporated has been the number of candles surrounding the catafalque or bier. Upon the death of Pope John XXIII, the catafalque was surrounded by 24 candles as was the catafalque of many of his predecessors. Pope Paul VI, requested only a single paschal candle placed near the catafalque, a practice continued by all subsequent pontiffs to date.

Upon their death, cardinals do not lie in state. Their casket is usually placed in vigil on the floor before the altar of the church of St Stephen of the Abyssinians, just behind St. Peter's Basilica. During this period, mourners may pay respects. The Requiem Mass is usually held within four days after death and is presided by the senior cardinal available. It is held at the Altar of the Chair behind the high altar of St. Peter's Basilica. The pope will attend if he is not traveling, and may participate or simply observe.

== Vietnam ==
The preserved body of Ho Chi Minh lies in state in the purpose-built Ho Chi Minh Mausoleum at the Ho Chi Minh Museum in Hanoi and is open for public viewing.

== Coptic Patriarchate ==
The Coptic Orthodox Church of Alexandria has a tradition of mummifying the deceased pope and placing his body on his throne to enable church followers to have a farewell look at him for a short period of time. This tradition is one of the ways that ancient Egyptian rituals have survived in the Egyptian church.

== Other notable funerals ==
- Death and funeral of Bhumibol Adulyadej
- Death and funeral of Pope Benedict XVI
- Death and state funeral of Elizabeth II
- Death and funeral of Corazon Aquino
- Death and state funeral of Omar Bongo
- Death and state funeral of George H. W. Bush
- Death and state funeral of Gerald Ford
- Death and state funeral of Jimmy Carter
- Death and state funeral of Kim Il Sung
- Death and state funeral of Kim Jong Il
- Death and state funeral of Lech and Maria Kaczyński
- State funeral of John F. Kennedy
- Death and state funeral of Richard Nixon
- Death and state funeral of Ronald Reagan
- Death and state funeral of Norodom Sihanouk
- Death and state funeral of Josip Broz Tito
- Death and state funeral of Pierre Trudeau
- Death and state funeral of Mao Zedong

== See also ==
- Wake or viewing
- Catafalque
- Chapelle ardente
- Funeral train
- Lying in repose
- State funeral
- State funerals in the United States and United Kingdom
- Vigil of the Princes
