= Order of precedence in Saskatchewan =

Relative preeminence of officials for ceremonial purposes

The Saskatchewan order of precedence is a nominal and symbolic hierarchy of important positions within the Canadian province of Saskatchewan. It has no legal standing but is used to dictate ceremonial protocol at events of a provincial nature.

- The King in Right of Saskatchewan (His Majesty Charles III)
- The Lieutenant Governor of Saskatchewan (Bernadette McIntyre SOM)
- Members of the Canadian Royal Family
- The Premier of Saskatchewan (Scott Moe)
- The Chief Justice of Saskatchewan (Robert G. Richards)
- Former Lieutenant Governors of Saskatchewan
  - Lynda Haverstock CM SOM
  - Gordon Barnhart SOM
  - Vaughn Solomon Schofield, SOM SVM
  - Russell Mirasty SOM MSM
- Former Premiers of Saskatchewan (not including those still holding other positions)
  - Grant Devine, SOM
  - Roy Romanow PC OC SOM KC
  - Lorne Calvert, SOM
  - Brad Wall
- Former Chief Justices of Saskatchewan (John Klebuc)
- The Speaker of the Legislative Assembly (Randy Weekes)
- The Deputy Premier (Donna Harpauer) and Members of the Executive Council
- The Leader of the Opposition (Carla Beck)
- The Chief Justice of the Court of King's Bench (Martel D. Popescul)
- Court of Appeal and the Court of King's Bench: the Justices of the two courts, in order of seniority of appointment to one of those courts.
- Provincial Court: the Chief Judge, then the Associate Chief Judge(s), then Judges in order of seniority of appointment
- The Members of the Legislative Assembly
  - Deputy Speaker (Joe Hargrave)
  - The Government House Leader, unless a member of the cabinet (Jeremy Harrison)
  - The Opposition House Leader (Vicki Mowat)
  - The other Members, with relative precedence to be determined by date of first election to the Legislature
- Members of the Senate who represent Saskatchewan, relative precedence determined by date of appointment
- Members of the House of Commons who represent Saskatchewan constituencies, with their relative precedence determined by date of first election
- Aboriginal Leaders:
  - the Chief and Vice-Chiefs of the Federation of Sovereign Indigenous Nations (FSIN)
  - the senior officers of the Tribal Councils
  - the Chiefs of Saskatchewan First Nation Bands
  - equivalent Métis leaders
- Leaders of Faith Communities: the Archbishop, or Senior Bishop in the Province, of the Anglican Church of Canada; the Archbishop of Regina and Metropolitan, or the Senior Bishop in the Province, of the Roman Catholic Church; the Bishop of the Saskatoon Eparchy of the Ukrainian Catholic Church; the President, or the Past President or the President-Elect, of the Saskatchewan Conference of The United Church of Canada; the Bishop of the Saskatchewan Synod of the Evangelical Lutheran Church in Canada; the senior representatives in the Province of the Alliance, Baptist, Mennonite, Orthodox and Presbyterian Churches and of the Jewish, Muslim and Hindu Faiths. (Relative precedence among the various religious leaders is determined by the date of appointment or election to their present office.)
- The Consular Corps in the Province, in the following order: Dean of the Consular Corps; Consuls-General; Consuls; Vice-Consuls; Consular Agents. (Relative precedence among them is determined by the date of their appointment.)
- Mayors, with precedence given to the mayor of the host municipality and subsequent relative precedence determined by the date of first taking office.
- Senior Officials:
  - the Deputy Minister to the Premier
  - the Cabinet Secretary/Clerk of the Executive Council
  - the Clerk of the Legislative Assembly
  - the Ombudsman
  - the Provincial Auditor
  - the Chief Electoral Officer
  - the Children's Advocate
  - the Information and Privacy Commissioner
  - the Conflict of Interest Commissioner.
- Deputy Ministers; then other senior Saskatchewan government officials with rank of Deputy Minister as determined by the Executive Council
- Chief Executive Officers of Crown Corporations (relative precedence determined by date of appointment).
- University officials:
  - the Chancellor of the University of Saskatchewan
  - the Chancellor of the University of Regina
  - the President of the University of Saskatchewan
  - the President of the University of Regina
- Police and Military:
  - the Commanding Officer of "F" Division, Royal Canadian Mounted Police
  - the Commanding Officer of Depot Division, Royal Canadian Mounted Police;
  - the President of the Saskatchewan Association of Chiefs of Police
  - the Wing Commander of 15 Wing Moose Jaw
  - the senior representative in Saskatchewan of 38 Canadian Brigade Group
  - the senior representative in Saskatchewan of Maritime Command

== Sources ==
- Table of Precedence for Saskatchewan
