= Clerk of the Senate =

Clerk of the Senate may refer to:

- Clerk of the Senate of Canada; or
- Clerk of the Australian Senate.
