= Vaughn Solomon Schofield =

Canadian politician (1943–2026)

The Honourable Vaughn Solomon Schofield SOM CD SVM
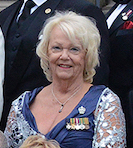
- Schofield in 2016

21st Lieutenant Governor of Saskatchewan
- In office March 22, 2012 – March 21, 2018
- Monarch: Elizabeth II
- Governors General: David Johnston; Julie Payette
- Premier: Brad Wall; Scott Moe
- Preceded by: Gordon Barnhart
- Succeeded by: W. Thomas Molloy

Personal details
- Born: Vaughn Carol Solomon; October 25, 1943 Regina, Saskatchewan, Canada
- Died: April 8, 2026 (aged 82) Regina, Saskatchewan, Canada
- Spouse: Gordon L. Schofield (died)
- Children: 2

Vaughn Carol Solomon Schofield, SOM CD SVM (October 25, 1943 – April 8, 2026) was a Canadian politician who was the 21st lieutenant governor of Saskatchewan, from 2012 to 2018. Her appointment as Lieutenant Governor was made by Governor General of Canada David Lloyd Johnston on the Constitutional advice of Prime Minister of Canada Stephen Harper on March 6, 2012, to succeed Gordon Barnhart. Solomon Schofield was sworn in on March 22, 2012 at the Legislative Assembly of Saskatchewan. She was the viceregal representative of Queen Elizabeth II of Canada in the Province of Saskatchewan. Solomon Schofield was a strong supporter of the Canadian Armed Forces, and stated during her installation that the military would be her focus during her term. Her affection for the Canadian Armed Forces stemmed from her time as Provincial Chair of the Canadian Forces Liaison Council, a position she was appointed to in January 2006. Solomon Schofield was Honorary Colonel of 15 Wing, Royal Canadian Air Force. She previously served as Honorary Colonel of 38 Artillery Tactical Group, part of 38 Canadian Brigade Group; as well as 38 Service Battalion.

== Background ==
Vaughn Carol Solomon was born in Regina on October 25, 1943, to George and Doris Solomon. She was educated at the University of Saskatchewan, Regina Campus and the Ray-Vogue School in Chicago, where she earned a degree in Fashion Merchandising. She was married to the late Gordon L. Schofield and the mother of Dr. Whitney Wignall, a pediatric dentist, and George, a realtor and the former mayor of Regina Beach, Saskatchewan. She was of English, Irish, Romanian and Ukrainian descent.

Schofield was fluent in English and Spanish, and later resided in Regina Beach, Saskatchewan. She died at a hospital in Regina, on April 8, 2026, at the age of 82.

== Career ==
Solomon Schofield was actively involved with several organizations. In the 1980s, she chaired the Board of Crime Watch, a 200,000-member crime prevention organization with groups in cities throughout North and South America. She had been Committee Chair, President, Vice-President and/or board member of a number of organizations in Regina, including St. John Ambulance, the Assiniboia Club, the Duke of Edinburgh's Award, the Royal United Services Institute, and the Hospitals of Regina Foundation. Solomon Schofield also was chief financial officer of Sprite North America for ten years.

Her other board memberships and affiliations included: the Saskatchewan Roughriders (Honorary Director), 2003 Grey Cup Committee (Chair-Security Volunteers), Regina Chamber of Commerce Business to Business Expo, Opera Saskatchewan and the Salvation Army.

Solomon Schofield was later President and CEO of the Western Group of Companies, a business real estate organization holding interests throughout Western Canada.

== Honours ==
- Commemorative Medal for the Centennial of Saskatchewan, 2005
- Saskatchewan Volunteer Medal, 2007
- Saskatchewan Order of Merit, 2012 (Also Chancellor of the Order during her term as Lieutenant Governor)
- Queen Elizabeth II Diamond Jubilee Medal, 2012
- Order of St. John of Jerusalem, 2012
- Service Medal of the Order of St. John, 2012
- Canadian Forces' Decoration, 2019

Coat of arms of Vaughn Solomon Schofield

Notes
Granted 20 June 2013
Crest
Issuant from a mural crown Azure masoned and charged with gardenias two geese rising Argent.
Escutcheon
Azure a bison’s head erased Or accorné Argent on a chief Or the helmet of Hermes between two cogwheels Purpure.
Supporters
Two huskies each holding an eagle’s feather and standing on a sandy beach set with wheat sheaves and Solomon’s seal plants Proper above a barrulet wavy Azure.
Motto
Family Faith Service

Preceded by Gordon Barnhart	Order of precedence in Saskatchewan as of 2018	Succeeded by Grant Devine
