= Government of Saskatchewan =

Provincial government

- Jurisdiction: Province

History
- Established: September 1, 1905

Composition
- Main organ: Executive Council

Authority and accountability
- Appointed by: Lieutenant Governor; Bernadette McIntyre
- Responsible to: Legislative Assembly

Operations
- Website: www.saskatchewan.ca

Seat
- Regina

The Government of Saskatchewan (French: Gouvernement de la Saskatchewan) is the provincial government of the province of Saskatchewan. Its powers and structure are set out in the Constitution Act, 1867.

In modern Canadian use, the term "government" refers broadly to the cabinet of the day (formally the Executive Council), elected from the Legislative Assembly and the non-political staff within each provincial department or agency – that is, the civil service.

The province of Saskatchewan has a unicameral legislature, the Saskatchewan Legislature, composed of the Lieutenant Governor and the Legislative Assembly, which operates in the Westminster system of government. The political party that wins the largest number of seats in the legislature normally forms the government, and the party's leader becomes premier of the province, i.e., the head of the government.

== Role of the Crown ==
The functions of the Sovereign, Charles III, King of Canada, known in Saskatchewan as the King in Right of Saskatchewan, are exercised by the Lieutenant Governor of Saskatchewan. The Lieutenant Governor is appointed by the Governor General of Canada on the recommendation of the Prime Minister of Canada.

== Executive Council ==
Typically, although not necessarily, consisting of members of the Legislative Assembly, the Executive Council of Saskatchewan is similar in structure and role to the Cabinet of Canada. As federal and provincial responsibilities differ there are a number of different portfolios between the federal and provincial governments. Members of the Cabinet, who advise, or minister, the vice-regal, are selected by the premier and appointed by the lieutenant governor.

== See also ==
- Politics of Saskatchewan
- Lieutenant Governor of Saskatchewan
- Premier of Saskatchewan
- Saskatchewan Legislature
- Legislative Assembly of Saskatchewan
- Executive Council of Saskatchewan
- 2020 Saskatchewan general election
