= Gordon Barnhart =

Canadian civil servant

The Honourable Gordon Barnhart OC SOM
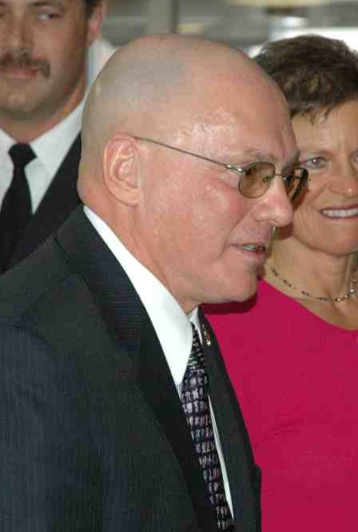

20th Lieutenant Governor of Saskatchewan
- In office August 1, 2006 – March 22, 2012
- Monarch: Elizabeth II
- Governors General: Michaëlle Jean; David Johnston
- Premier: Lorne Calvert; Brad Wall
- Preceded by: Lynda Haverstock
- Succeeded by: Vaughn Solomon Schofield

12th Clerk of the Senate and Clerk of the Parliaments
- In office 1989–1994
- Preceded by: Charles A. Lussier
- Succeeded by: Paul Bélisle

Personal details
- Born: January 22, 1945 (age 81) Saltcoats, Saskatchewan, canada
- Spouse: Naomi Barnhart
- Profession: Civil servant

Academic background
- Education: University of Regina; University of Saskatchewan
- Thesis: Peace, progress and prosperity: A biography of the Hon. Walter Scott (1999)
- Doctoral advisor

Academic work
- Discipline: History
- Sub-discipline: Canadian political history
- Institutions: University of Saskatchewan

Gordon Leslie Barnhart OC SOM (born January 22, 1945) is a former Clerk of the Senate of Canada and the Saskatchewan Legislature, as well as former Secretary of the University of Saskatchewan. He was the 20th lieutenant governor of Saskatchewan from 2006 until 2012. He was the interim President of the University of Saskatchewan as from May 21, 2014 until October 24, 2015.

== Biography ==
Barnhart was born in Saltcoats, Saskatchewan. He completed his Bachelor of Arts in history in 1967 and in 1968, he took a job teaching grades 10 and 11 history at North Battleford Collegiate Institute (now North Battleford Comprehensive High School). In 1968, after only four months of teaching, he was appointed Clerk of the Saskatchewan Legislative Assembly, the youngest to take on such a position across the Commonwealth. During his tenure, he worked on his Master of Arts at the University of Regina, completing it in 1977.

In 1989, Governor General Jeanne Sauvé, on the advice of Prime Minister Brian Mulroney, appointed Barnhart to Clerk of the Senate, and thereby Clerk of the Parliaments. After five years, which included contributing to the failed Charlottetown Accord, he resigned from his position in the Senate. He returned to the University of Saskatchewan, where he completed his Doctorate in 1998.

From 2000 to 2005, he served as Secretary of the University of Saskatchewan. He retired to teach political studies classes, specializing in Canadian politics, government and the Canadian Senate.

In 2001, Barnhart's book Peace, Progress and Prosperity (ISBN 0-88977-142-1), which provided the first detailed biography of Saskatchewan's first premier, Thomas Walter Scott, was first published. Some of his other works include Saskatchewan's Premiers of the Twentieth Century, Building for the Future; a photo journal of Saskatchewan's Legislative Building and Parliamentary Committees: Enhancing Democratic Governance.

On April 28, 2006, Canadian prime minister Stephen Harper announced that Gordon Barnhart would replace Lynda Haverstock as Lieutenant-Governor of Saskatchewan. He was sworn in on August 1, 2006. Barnhart's term ended on March 22, 2012, when he was replaced by Vaughn Solomon Schofield.

The University of Saskatchewan announced that Barnhart would return to the faculty of the Department of History as of April 1, 2012 as an adjunct professor.

On May 21, 2014, it was announced that Barnhart had been appointed interim President at the University of Saskatchewan to replace Ilene Busch-Vishniac who was fired. He served as interim president until October 24, 2015, when he was succeeded by Peter Stoicheff.

On June 30, 2014, Barnhart was named a Member of the Order of Canada.

As mayor of the town of Saltcoats, Barnhart has served as the president of the organization of Municipalities of Saskatchewan from 2017 - 2021. During his 2021 re-election for the Municipalities of Saskatchewan presidency, Barnhart was found to be vacationing in Hawaii despite the ongoing COVID-19 pandemic and the border between the United States and Canada being closed to nonessential travel. Barnhart lost his re-election bid by an overwhelming margin, receiving 115 votes compared to the victor, Rodger Hayward's 351 votes.

== As Lieutenant-Governor ==
It's a non-partisan position, so I'm not representing the government, I'm not representing a political party, I'm representing the Queen. So that's the role of the Head of State, and I think it's a very important one. I would like to think that we've had a very good string of Lieutenant Governors in Saskatchewan. I feel that I am part of a heritage of very strong, hardworking people who have been Lieutenant Governor over the decades.

— Gordon Barnhart, Saskatoon, 2006

Gordon and Naomi Barnhart attend a community event for the Monarchist League of Canada in their first year as Saskatchewan's vice-regal couple, 2006.

As lieutenant-governor, Barnhart carries out such duties as reading throne speeches, swearing in premiers and cabinet ministers, opening legislative sessions, approving legislation and bestowing honours to Saskatchewan citizens.

Upon being sworn in, Barnhart expressed his respect and admiration for his predecessors. As an academic, he expects to focus his efforts on education. He also plans on travelling a great deal to continue the office's accessibility to average Saskatchewanians provided by Haverstock.

Barnhart hosted hundreds of visitors on the occasion of his first New Year's Levee at Government House in 2007, a traditional event that lieutenant-governors in Regina have hosted since 1884.

Barnhart also initiated the "Lieutenant-Governor's Leadership Forum", which will accept eighteen grade 11 and 12 students each year from 2007 till 2011 to tour the province, meet successful leaders in various fields, and to develop the students' own leadership abilities.

=== Additional roles ===
- Visitor to the University of Saskatchewan
- Visitor to the University of Regina

=== Patronage ===
- Saskatchewan Brain Injury Association
- Canadians Clubs of Saskatchewan
- Canadian Parents for French
- Canadian Peony Society Show, Regina, 2008
- Conexus Arts Centre, Regina
- Saskatchewan Craft Council
- Saskatchewan Elocution and Debate Association
- International Biology Olympiad, Saskatoon, 2007
- Lung Association of Saskatchewan
- Luther College, Regina
- Monarchist League of Canada
- Saskatchewan Music Festivals Association
- Saskatchewan Poet Laureate Program
- Lyric Musical Theatre (formerly Regina Lyric Light Opera)
- Saskatchewan Youth Parliament
- Saskatchewan Architectural Heritage Society

== Arms ==
Coat of arms of Gordon Barnhart
| Notes The arms of Gordon Barnhart consist of: Crest The dome and colonnade of the Saskatchewan Legislative Building proper; Escutcheon Vert eight barrulets intersecting in fess point, overall an open book Or; Supporters Two harts Or each gorged of a wreath of orchids, Gerbera daisies proper and roses Gules pendent therefrom a disc of Saltcoats tartan, standing on a beaver dam proper; |

== See also ==
- Monarchy in Saskatchewan
- Government House (Saskatchewan)

Government offices
| Preceded by Lynda Haverstock | Lieutenant Governor of Saskatchewan; 2006–2012 | Succeeded by Vaughn Solomon Schofield |
