= Office-holders of Canada =

This is a list of leaders and office-holders of Canada. See also Canadian incumbents by year.

== Monarchs ==
- Monarchs of Canadian territories (1497–)
- Monarchs of Canada (1497–)

== Federal ==
=== Governors general ===
- Governors general of Canada (1627–)

=== Heads of government ===
- Prime ministers of Canada (1867–)
- Premiers of the Province of Canada (1841–1867)

=== Cabinet ministers ===
Also known as ministers of the Crown

- Cabinet of Canada
- Deputy prime ministers of Canada (1977–)
- Ministers of agriculture (1867–)
- Ministers of Canadian heritage (1996–)
- Ministers of citizenship and immigration (1994–)
- Ministers of the environment (1971–)
- Ministers of finance (1867–)
- Ministers of fisheries and oceans (1979–)
- Ministers of foreign affairs (1995–)
- Ministers of forestry (1990–1995)
- Ministers of health (1944–)
- Ministers of human resources development (1996–2003)
- Ministers of Indian affairs and northern development (1966–)
- Ministers of industry (1995–)
- Ministers of industry, science and technology (1990–1995)
- Ministers of intergovernmental affairs (1993–)
- Ministers for international cooperation (1996–)
- Ministers of international trade (1983–)
- Ministers of justice (1867–)
- Ministers of national defence (1923–)
- Ministers of natural resources (1995–)
- Ministers of pensions and national health (1928–1944)
- Ministers of public safety and emergency preparedness (2003–)
- Ministers of public works and government services (1996–)
- Ministers of railways and canals (1879–1936)
- Ministers of veterans affairs (1944–)
- Secretaries of state for external affairs (1909–1995)

=== Parliamentary office-holders ===
- Leaders of the Opposition (1867–)
- Canadian senators
- Members of the Canadian House of Commons

== Provinces ==
=== Lieutenant governors ===
- Lieutenant governors of Alberta
- Lieutenant governors of British Columbia
- Lieutenant governors of Manitoba
- Lieutenant governors of New Brunswick
- Lieutenant governors of Newfoundland and Labrador
- Lieutenant governors of Nova Scotia
- Lieutenant governors of Ontario
- Lieutenant governors of Prince Edward Island
- Lieutenant governors of Quebec
- Lieutenant governors of Saskatchewan

=== Heads of government ===
- Premiers of Alberta
- Premiers of British Columbia
- Premiers of Manitoba
- Premiers of New Brunswick
- Premiers of Newfoundland and Labrador
- Premiers of Nova Scotia
- Premiers of Ontario
- Premiers of Prince Edward Island
- Premiers of Quebec
- Premiers of Saskatchewan

for the premiers in any given year.

=== Executive councils ===
For the executive councils (cabinet) of each province, see Executive Council (Canada).

== Territories ==
Unlike the provinces, the territories of Canada have no inherent jurisdiction and only have those powers delegated to them by the federal government.

=== Commissioners ===
Unlike the Governor General or a Lieutenant-Governor, who are representatives of the Queen of Canada, Commissioners are not vice-regal representatives. They are appointed by the federal government as a delegate of cabinet. Under the federal statutes governing the territories, the Commissioners act in accordance with written instructions from the cabinet or the minister responsible (currently the Minister of Indian Affairs and Northern Development).

- Commissioners of Northwest Territories
- Commissioners of Nunavut
- Commissioners of Yukon

=== Heads of government ===
- Premiers of the Northwest Territories
- Premiers of Nunavut
- Premiers of Yukon

== Municipalities ==
In Canada, incorporated municipalities are creations of the provincial and territorial governments. They have no independent existence under the Constitution.

- List of mayors in Canada

== See also ==
- Lists of office-holders
