= Thomas Miller (Saskatchewan) =

Canadian politician

The Honourable Thomas Miller
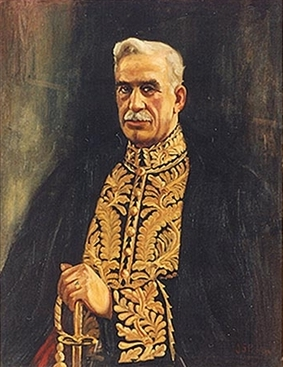
- Thomas Miller during his time as Lieutenant Governor of Saskatchewan.

7th Lieutenant Governor of Saskatchewan
- In office February 27, 1945 – June 20, 1945
- Monarch: George VI
- Governor General: The Earl of Athlone
- Premier: Tommy Douglas
- Preceded by: Archibald Peter McNab
- Succeeded by: Reginald John Marsden Parker

Personal details
- Born: July 21, 1876 Grand Valley, Ontario
- Died: June 20, 1945 (aged 68) Regina, Saskatchewan, Canada
- Occupation: newspaper editor
- Profession: Politician

Thomas Miller (July 21, 1876 – June 20, 1945) was the shortest serving and seventh lieutenant governor of Saskatchewan in 1945 for less than four months.

Miller was born in Grand Valley, Ontario. While he was a boy, his family moved to Regina, Saskatchewan.

From 1892 to 1894, Miller apprenticed with the Regina Standard newspaper. When the proprietors purchased the Moose Jaw Times they put Miller in charge of the printing press. In 1896, he became president and managing editor of the newspaper and remained involved with what became the Times-Herald newspaper for fifty years.

He was appointed lieutenant-governor in 1945 on the advice of federal Prime Minister William Lyon Mackenzie King and made his official residence at the Hotel Saskatchewan as the provincial government had closed Government House the previous year.

Miller presided over victory celebrations in the province following the end of World War II.

He died of a heart attack on June 20, 1945.
