= Russell Mirasty =

Lieutenant Governor of Saskatchewan from 2019 to 2025

The Honourable Russell Mirasty SOM MSM
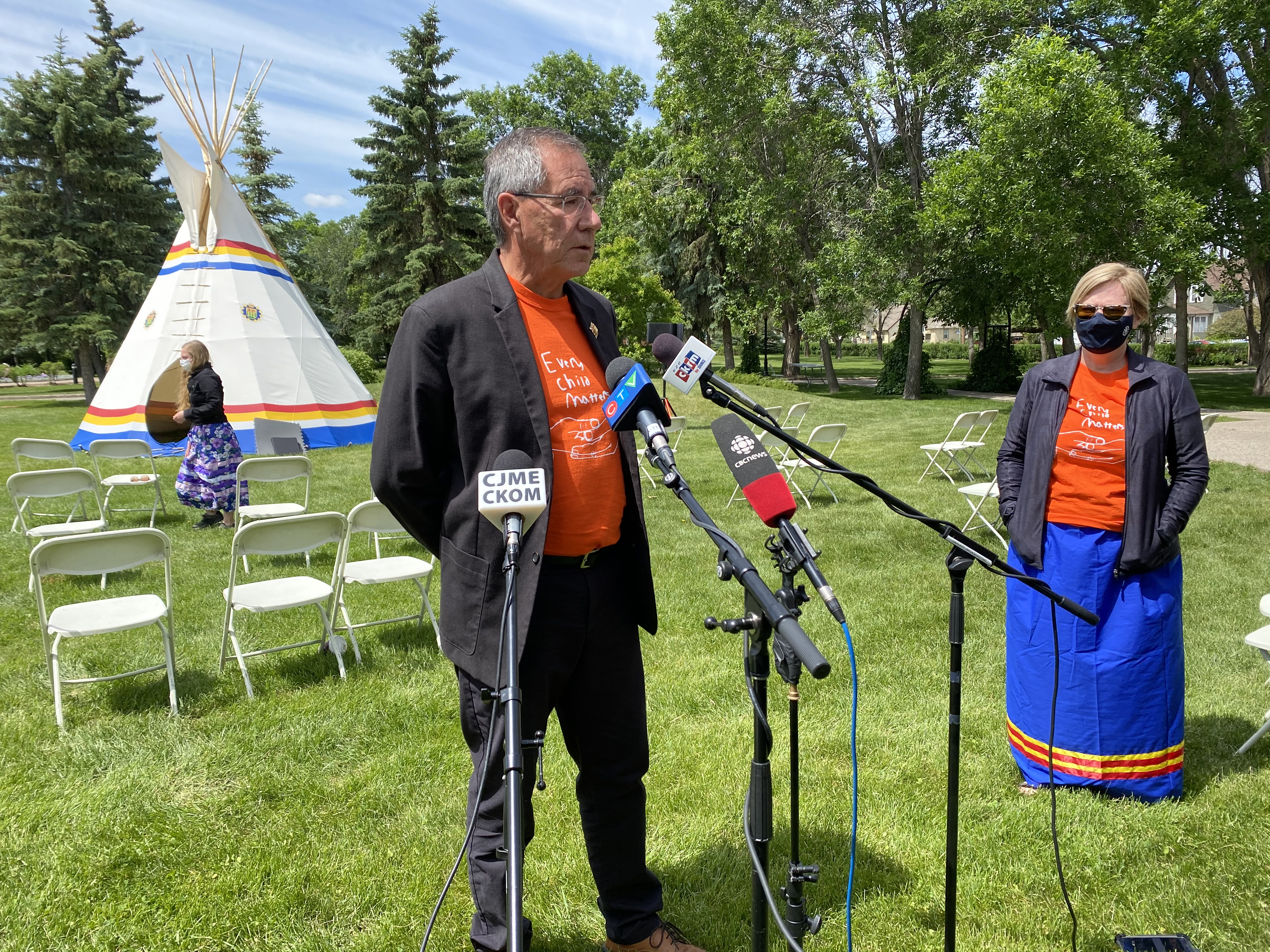
- Mirasty speaking at an event on June 21, 2021

23rd Lieutenant Governor of Saskatchewan
- In office July 18, 2019 – January 31, 2025
- Monarchs: Elizabeth II; Charles III
- Governors General: Julie Payette; Mary Simon
- Premier: Scott Moe
- Preceded by: W. Thomas Molloy
- Succeeded by: Bernadette McIntyre

Personal details
- Born: 1956 or 1957 (age 69–70) La Ronge, Saskatchewan, Canada
- Education: RCMP Academy, Depot Division
- Profession: Police officer (Royal Canadian Mounted Police)

Russell Mirasty SOM MSM (born 1956 or 1957) was the 23rd lieutenant governor of Saskatchewan from 2019 to 2025. He was appointed by Governor General Julie Payette, on the constitutional advice of the prime minister of Canada, Justin Trudeau, on July 17, 2019. Mirasty was sworn in on July 18, filling the vacancy in the position left when W. Thomas Molloy died in office on July 2.

Mirasty's term as lieutenant governor came to an official end on January 31, 2025, with the installation of his successor, Bernadette McIntyre.

As lieutenant governor, Mirasty was the viceregal representative of Charles III of Canada in Saskatchewan. He was the first Indigenous person appointed to this office.

== Personal life ==
Mirasty is a member of the Lac La Ronge Indian Band. His first language is Cree. His appointment was strongly welcomed by Indigenous leaders in Saskatchewan.

He and his wife Donna have two children. At the time of his appointment, he and his wife lived in La Ronge.

== RCMP career ==
Mirasty was a member of the Royal Canadian Mounted Police (RCMP) for thirty-six years, from 1976 to 2013. He was one of only two Indigenous cadets in his troop at RCMP Academy, Depot Division. Following graduation, he served in seven of Canada's ten provinces. He also did a work exchange with the Northern Territory Police in Australia. Mirasty was a volunteer aide-de-camp to previous lieutenant governors of Saskatchewan. He was appointed assistant commissioner and commanding officer, "F" Division in 2010, the first Indigenous RCMP officer to command a division.

After retiring from the RCMP, Mirasty volunteered with a number of community service organizations. He particularly focused on working with Saskatchewan's education system. In 2017, Mirasty was awarded the Meritorious Service Medal.

== Honours ==
Russell Mirasty's full medal entitlement is as follows.

Ribbon	Description	Notes
	Order of St John (K.StJ)	25 July 2020.; Knight of Justice.; Vice Prior of the Order in the Province of Saskatchewan.
	Saskatchewan Order of Merit (SOM)	2019.
	Meritorious Service Medal (MSM)	9 November 2017.; Civil Division.
	Queen Elizabeth II Golden Jubilee Medal	2002.; Canadian version of this medal.
	Queen Elizabeth II Diamond Jubilee Medal	2012.; Canadian version of this medal.
	Royal Canadian Mounted Police Long Service Medal	With 35 year Bar
	Queen Elizabeth II Platinum Jubilee Medal	2022.; Saskatchewan version of this medal.
	King Charles III Coronation Medal	2024.; Canadian version of this medal.

== Legacy ==
Russell Mirasty's official portrait at the Saskatchewan Legislative Building rotunda was revealed to the public on June 24, 2026.

Order of precedence
Preceded by Antoinette Perry as Lieutenant Governor of Prince Edward Island	Canadian order of precedence as Lieutenant Governor of Saskatchewan	Succeeded by Salma Lakhani as Lieutenant Governor of Alberta
Preceded by King Charles III, King of Canada	Order of precedence in Saskatchewan as of 2022	Succeeded by Scott Moe, Premier of Saskatchewan
