= Government House (Saskatchewan) =

Office of the Lieutenant Governor of Saskatchewan

Coordinates: 50.454°N 104.647753°W

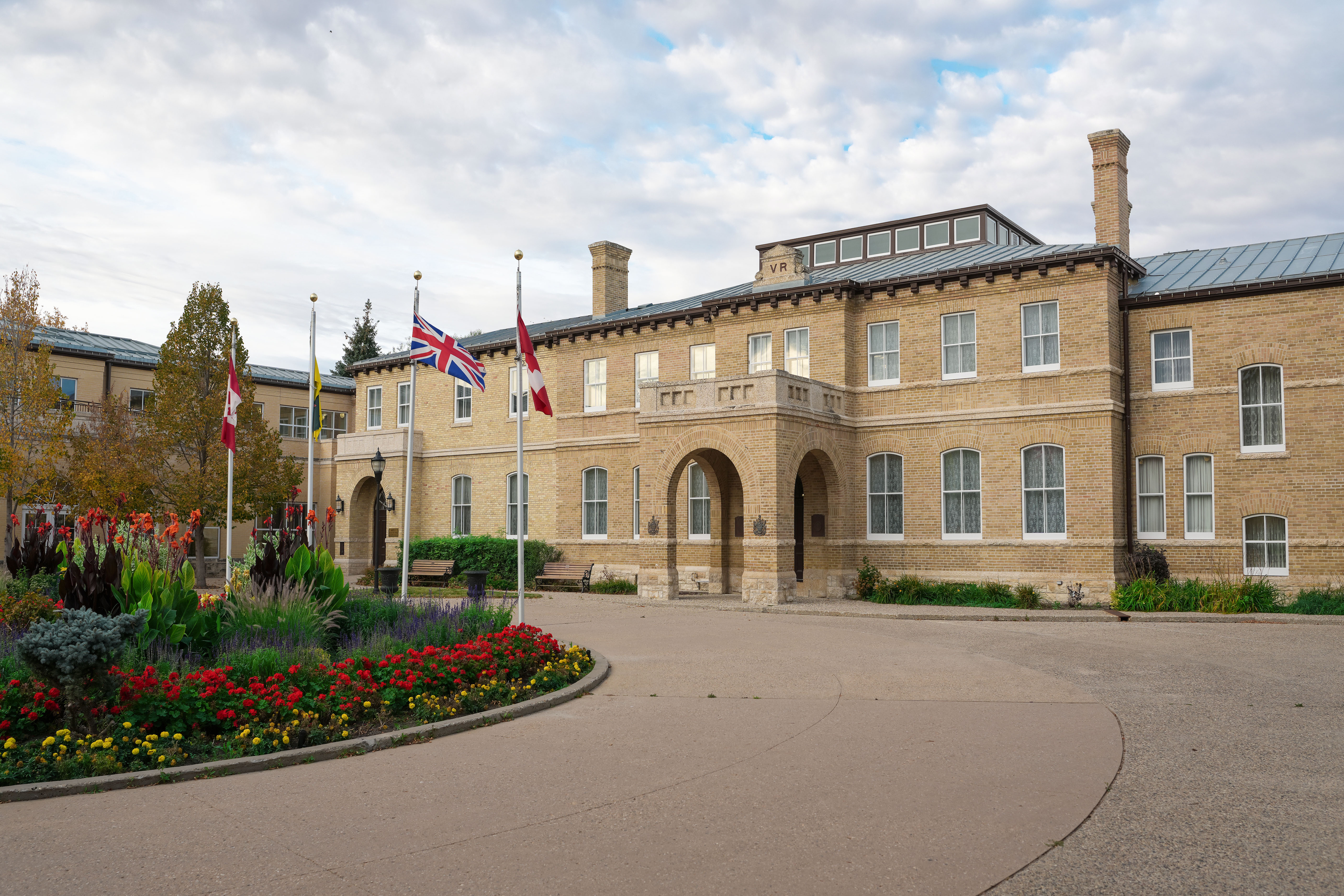
- Government House main entrance

General information
- Architectural style: Modified Italianate
- Location: 4607 Dewdney Avenue; Regina, Saskatchewan; S4T 1B7
- Construction started: 1889
- Cost: $50,000
- Client: The Queen of the United Kingdom (Victoria)
- Owner: The King in Right of Saskatchewan (Charles III)

Design and construction
- Architect: Thomas Fuller

National Historic Site of Canada
- Official name: Government House National Historic Site of Canada
- Designated: 1968

Government House in Regina, Saskatchewan, Canada, is the official office of the lieutenant governor of Saskatchewan. It was first constructed as a residence for the lieutenant governor of the North-West Territories, whose territorial headquarters were in Regina. When the provinces of Saskatchewan and Alberta were created out of the Territories in 1905, Regina became the capital of Saskatchewan and Government House became the official residence of the lieutenant governor of Saskatchewan. It was vacated in 1944 and then returned to official ceremonial use in 1984.

== History ==
=== Design and construction ===
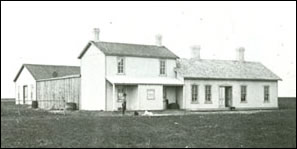
First Regina Government House shortly after construction in 1883

A substantial brick and masonry building, the new Government House replaced the cold, draughty wooden pre-constructed clapboard 1883 Government House which stood on the current site of Luther College High School on Dewdney Avenue and Royal Street, five blocks west, until its demolition in 1908.

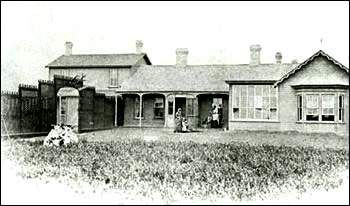
The old Government House c.1887. The pile of buffalo bones on the left is reminiscent of Regina's original name, Wascana, being Cree for Pile of Bones

The 1883 predecessor had been assembled shortly after the decision of the North-West Territories Lieutenant-Governor Edgar Dewdney to relocate the capital from Battleford. In fact it was widely assumed that the new capital would be Troy (renamed Qu'Appelle) or Fort Qu'Appelle, but Dewdney had acquired land at Buffalo Bones which he could and did become rich by selling to settlers, and despite it being without trees, even poplar bluffs or bushes, or water apart from the slight spring run-off Wascana Creek, named it the new capital. Indeed, the street on which Government House is located was named after him. The prefabricated building material was from in eastern Canada and transported to the new site. It was a single story wooden structure consisting of two portable houses later developed into a more imposing structure. Additions were made in 1883, after which it had four bedrooms, two dressing rooms, a drawing room, a dining room, a large and small kitchen with pantry and storeroom, a front veranda and porch, and a conservatory.

The 1891 Government House, then a remarkably substantial brick and masonry building, was designed by the Dominion architect, Thomas Fuller, together with the Territorial government buildings east on Dewdney Avenue. Fuller had earlier designed the 1866 parliament buildings in Ottawa, which had been designed for the capital of the Province of Canada, lasting from 1841 to 1867 and consisting only of Quebec and Ontario.

Government House was designed in this Italianate style. Typical of the design, the House boasts a squared dome centred on its peak. Its windows are of a Roman arch design and of a segmented arch variation.Construction on the new Vice-Regal residence began in the spring of 1889. Local contractor William Henderson was awarded the project and construction began on the new residence in the spring of 1889 on fifty-three acres. The ground floor consisted of a lobby or reception area, a vestibule and a main hall, a staircase, two drawing rooms, dining room, library, billiard room, kitchen, housekeeper's room, servant's hall, scullery, dairy storage, cooling room, storeroom, china pantry, wine vault, brick safe and a lavatory....At its completion in 1891, Government House was by far the most advanced dwelling in the Northwest Territories. It boasted running water, which was pumped from a well in the basement to a collection tank situated in the attic, and then fed by gravity throughout the house. Sewage was directed from indoor flush toilets to a brick cesspool in the garden area....The plan called for Government House to rest upon a foundation comprising brick and stone construction. Its main portion was 64 feet by 55 feet, and the servant's areas, offices, and bedrooms were 55 feet by 42 feet. In the basement, space was to be provided for a furnace, storage areas, and space for tanks for rain and well water.

Government House was completed at a cost of $50,000 and was the first residence in the Territories to be electrified (the Regina YMCA had been electrified in 1890). The Hon. Joseph Royal, Lieutenant-Governor of the North-West Territories 1888–93, was the first to live and work there. A conservatory was built in 1901 and a ballroom in 1929.

=== Use as government house (1891-1944) ===
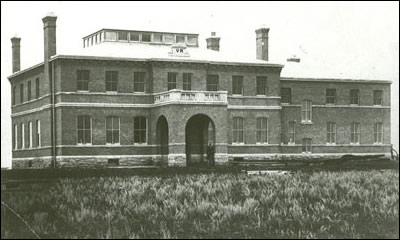
Government House North-West Territories in 1892 shortly after building, before eastern ballroom built and gardens and trees planted

From its completion in 1891 until the formation of the provinces of Alberta and Saskatchewan in 1905, Government House was the workplace and residence of Lieutenant-Governors of the North-West Territories, the legislative buildings being east on Dewdney Avenue. Lieutenant-Governors Charles Herbert Mackintosh, Malcolm Colin Cameron and Amédée E. Forget lived and worked in it during this time.

In 1901 the Duke and Duchess of York, later King George V and Queen Mary – visited the North-West Territories and were accommodated at Regina's Government House, where they received and met local citizens.

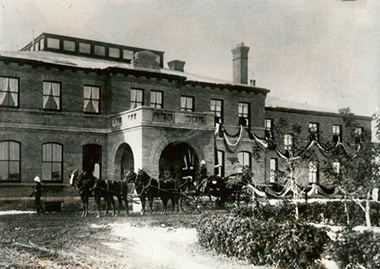
Government House during the Royal Visit by the future King George V and Queen Mary, then Duke and Duchess of Cornwall and York, to the then-Territories, 1901

Government buildings were not built south of Wascana Lake until after the province was established in 1905. The Territory's former government buildings on Dewdney Avenue (but not Government House) then ceased having such use, such reduction in public expenditure being widely deemed to be entirely reasonable during a second World War immediately following the Great Depression, intensified on the then substantially agricultural Canadian Prairies by the Great Drought.

Lieutenant-Governors of the North-West Territories who lived and worked in Government House
Name			Comments
Hon. Joseph Royal	1891	1893	became Lieutenant-Governor in 1888, moved in 1891
Hon. Charles Herbert Mackintosh	1893	1898	
Hon. Malcolm Colin Cameron	1898	1898	
Hon. Amédée E. Forget	1898	1905	

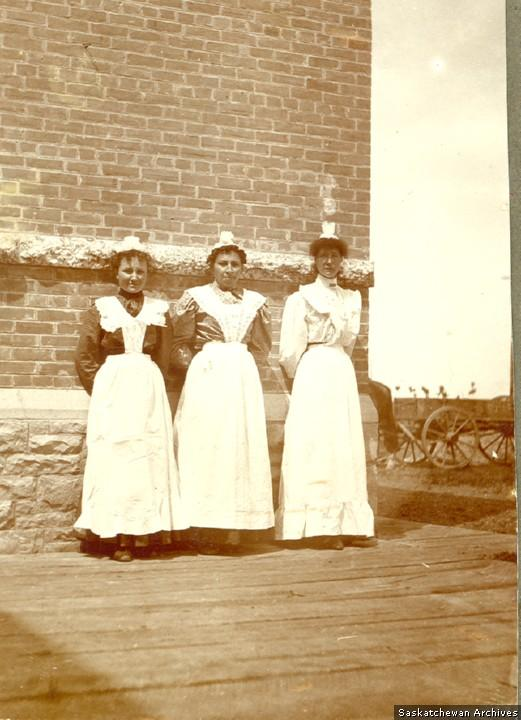
Authentic household staff at Government House, 1898

After 1 September 1905, Government House was the residence and work-place of six lieutenant governors of Saskatchewan. Between 1905 and 1944, Government House accommodated several official guests to the province. These included: April, 1906, when Prince Arthur, the Duke of Connaught, visited Regina; and both October 1912 and July 1916, when the Duke and Duchess of Connaught and Princess Patricia visited while the Duke was Governor General, the first time for the Duke, son of Queen Victoria, to inaugurate the Saskatchewan Legislative Assembly. The Prince of Wales, later King Edward VIII, visited Saskatchewan in 1919 and again in 1927, though the Hotel Saskatchewan had opened on Victoria Avenue by the time of his second visit. In 1944 Premier Tommy Douglas, very soon after his election, followed Ontario in closing the provincial vice-regal residence.

Lieutenant-Governors of the Province of Saskatchewan who lived and worked in Government House
Name			Comments
Hon. Amédée E. Forget	1905	1910	
Hon. George William Brown	1910	1915	
Hon. Sir Richard Stuart Lake	1915	1921	
Hon. Henry William Newlands	1921	1931	
Hon. Hugh Edwin Munroe	1931	1936	
Hon. Archibald Peter McNab	1936	1945	moved out in 1944

=== Change in use (1944) ===
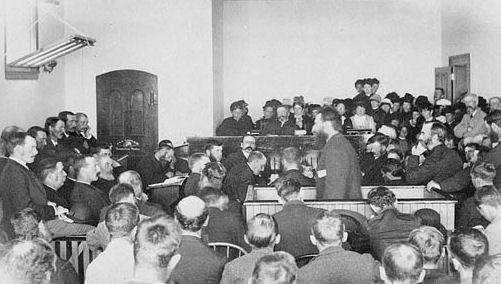
Louis Riel testifies at his trial, the scene precisely represented in performances of John Coulter's play "The Trial of Louis Riel" in Government House's ballroom

Vice-regal residences were something of an anomaly in the political climate and difficult economic situation of the Great Depression and World War II throughout Canada but particularly on the prairies. In March 1944, the Government of Saskatchewan closed Government House and sold its contents. Lieutenant Governor "Archie" McNab was the last lieutenant governor to live in Government House. He established a small office in the Hotel Saskatchewan on Victoria Avenue downtown, which the Canadian Pacific Railway opened in 1927. Thereafter, royal visitors were also accommodated in luxury hotels.

The furnishings and household goods were sold at auction and Government House was leased to the federal Department of Veterans Affairs for use as a veterans rehabilitation facility. In 1958, renamed Saskatchewan House, the building entered into 10 years' use as an adult education centre until it was proposed that it be demolished and the site redeveloped. A large part of the extensive grounds had already been sold for the construction of the Pioneer Village nursing home and other uses.

From 1967 John Coulter's play "The Trial of Louis Riel" was performed throughout the summers in the Government House (then "Saskatchewan House") ballroom, arrayed as in photos of the original Supreme Court of the North-West Territories courthouse at the corner of Victoria Avenue and Hamilton Street, Regina, with members of the audience recruited as jurymen. Local lawyer Stephen Arsenych customarily performed the role of Riel.

The period after World War Two saw the demolition of many historic buildings in Regina, such as the old city hall on 11th Avenue, several downtown movie theatres and both Knox United and Trinity Evangelical Lutheran churches. However, Government House avoided this fate. In 1968 it was designated a National Historic Site of Canada and was thereafter renovated.

=== Restoration and use as viceregal offices (1984) ===
A number of historically minded people belonging to local groups including the Regina Chamber of Commerce, Imperial Order Daughters of the Empire, Regina Council of Women, and the City of Regina were brought together to fight for the preservation of and restoration of the building.

In 1971, the Society for the Preservation and Restoration of Saskatchewan House (now the Government House Historical Society) was formed and by 1980 many of its efforts were rewarded. Government House, its original name and historical fittings and many historical contents restored, many such contents having been acquired by departing employees and others when Government House was closed. In 1984, the offices of the lieutenant governor returned to Government House and vice-regal receptions began being held there again, although lieutenant governors did not resume living in Government House but are housed in accommodation provided by the Government of Canada, reflecting the role of the federal government in providing vice-regal appointments for the provinces and keeping the entire interior of the building available for public use. The Provincial Capital Commission now maintains Government House and provides tours of the residence and grounds.

=== Addition of visitor and administration centre (2005) ===
In 2005, a visitor and administration centre and coach house were added, the new wing opened by Queen Elizabeth II and named in her honour, while the historic older wing was named the Victoria wing. The grounds that remained, after alienation of a substantial proportion of them for the Pioneer Village old peoples' home built in 1967, were restored to their Edwardian configuration as a provincial centennial project. Government House is now "a museum of the 1900 period under Lieutenant-Governor Amédée Forget, and a hospitality facility for government and non-profit organizations".

== Lieutenant-Governor's New Year's Day Levee and other public receptions ==
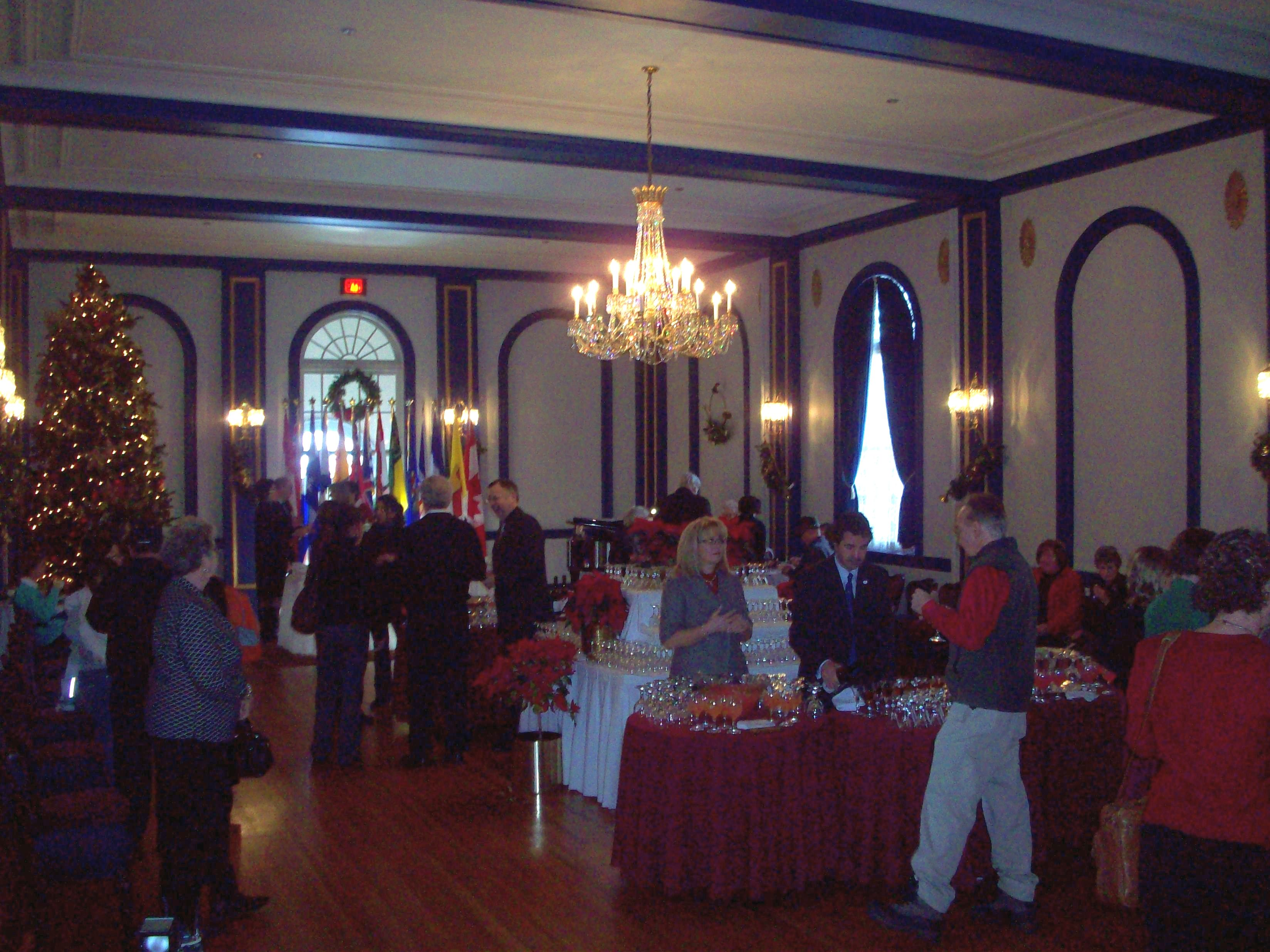
Government House ballroom—a theatre during the building's time out of service as Government House – during New Year's Day Levee

The tradition of the Lieutenant-Governor holding a New Years Day levée in the Government House foyer and ballroom for the public resumed immediately after the Lieutenant-Governor's offices returned with a receiving line where the Vice-regal party greets the public and fruitcake and sherry are served in the ballroom. Government House is extensively decorated in holiday mode throughout, especially in the ballroom and foyer. Guides in period costume (albeit, curiously, in the costume of the 1780s rather than the 1890s, in mobcaps, tricorne hats, and knee breeches) give free tours of Government House. The Government House Historical Society holds a Victorian tea in the ballroom on some weekends during the spring, summer and fall season.

== Alleged haunting ==
Over the years, several staff and former students have observed strange occurrences at Government House. Doors have been said to open and close repeatedly with no one near, the sound of crying babies and laughing children have been heard late at night with no one around, and others have claimed to see eerie faces next to theirs when looking into mirrors.

One particular apparition of note is "Howie", believed to be Cheun Lee, the former cook of Lieutenant-Governor Archibald McNab. Many believe that his ghost roams the house; his footsteps often heard shuffling through the halls. He even has a say in the interior decorating—witnesses have inexplicably found objects shifted or moved from one room to another.

== Photo gallery ==
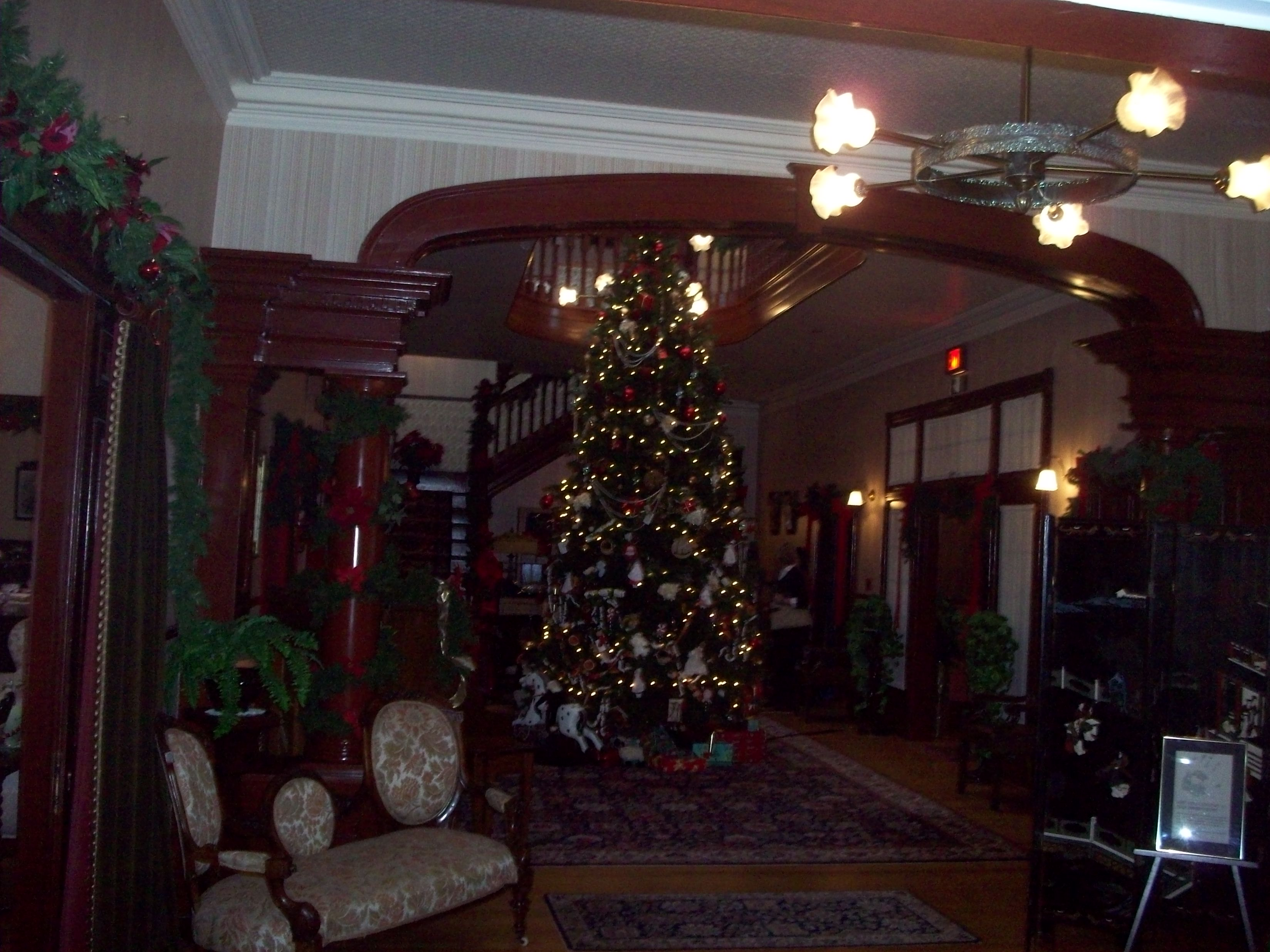
Ground floor hallway

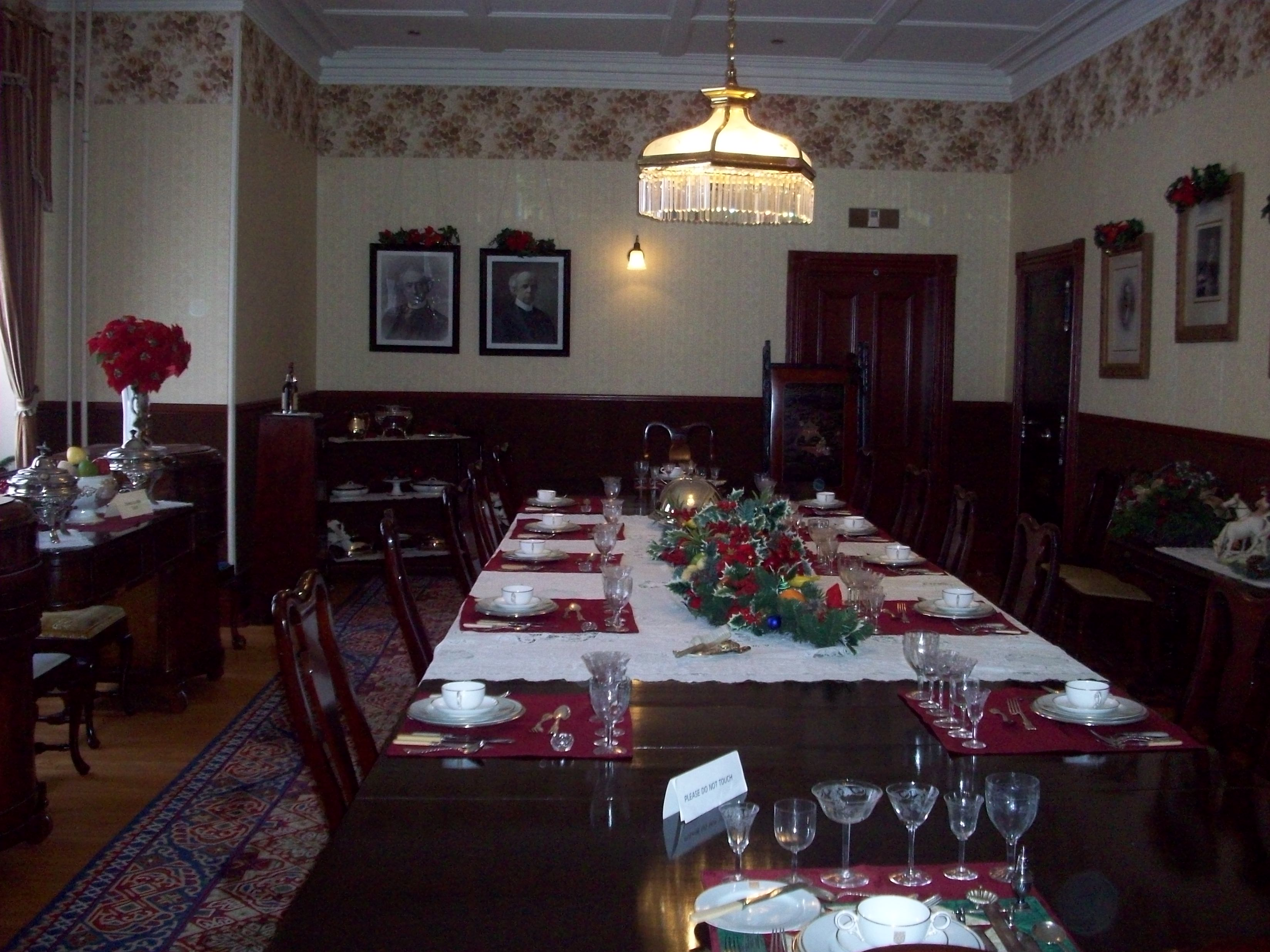
Dining room

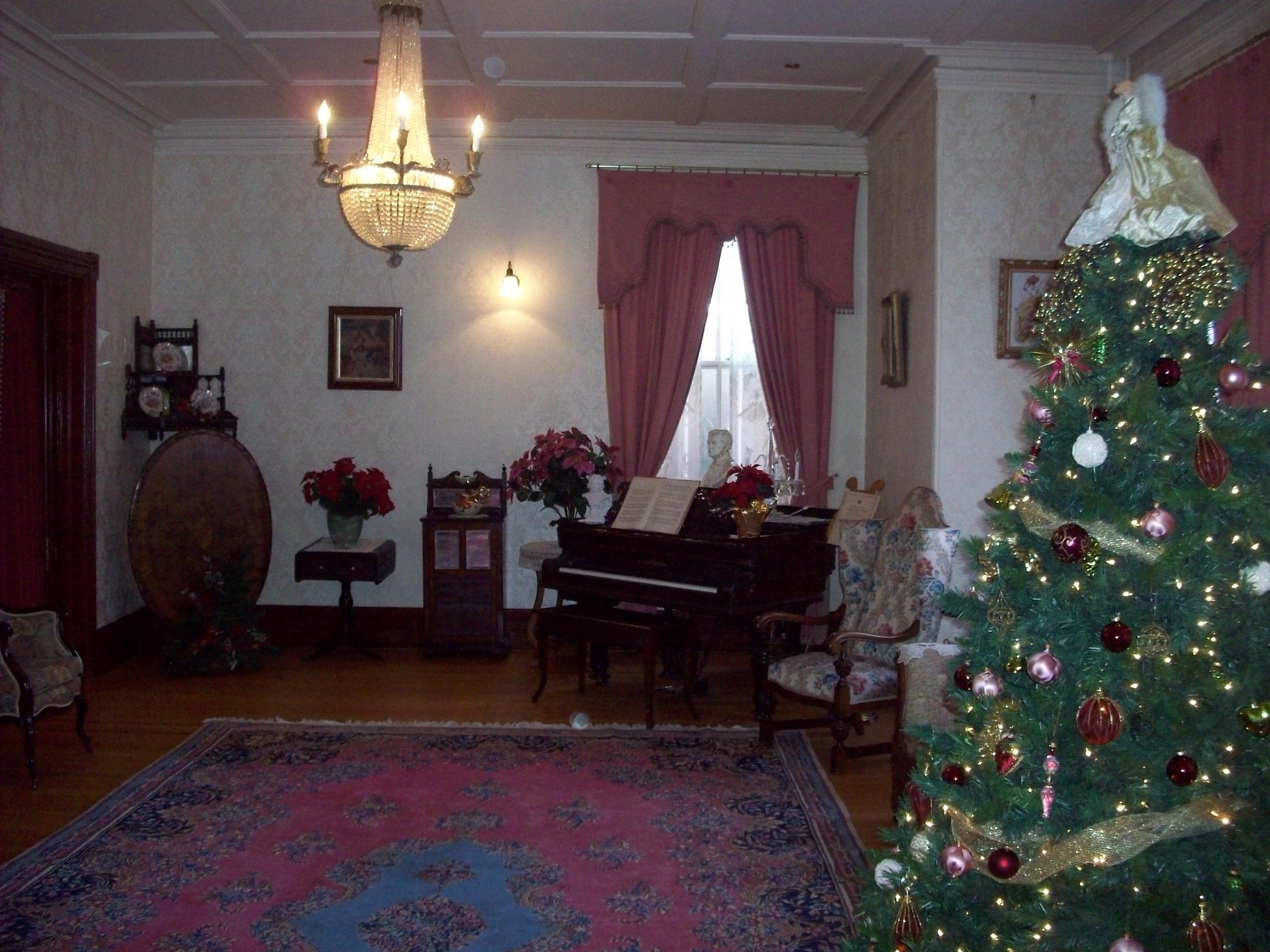
Parlour

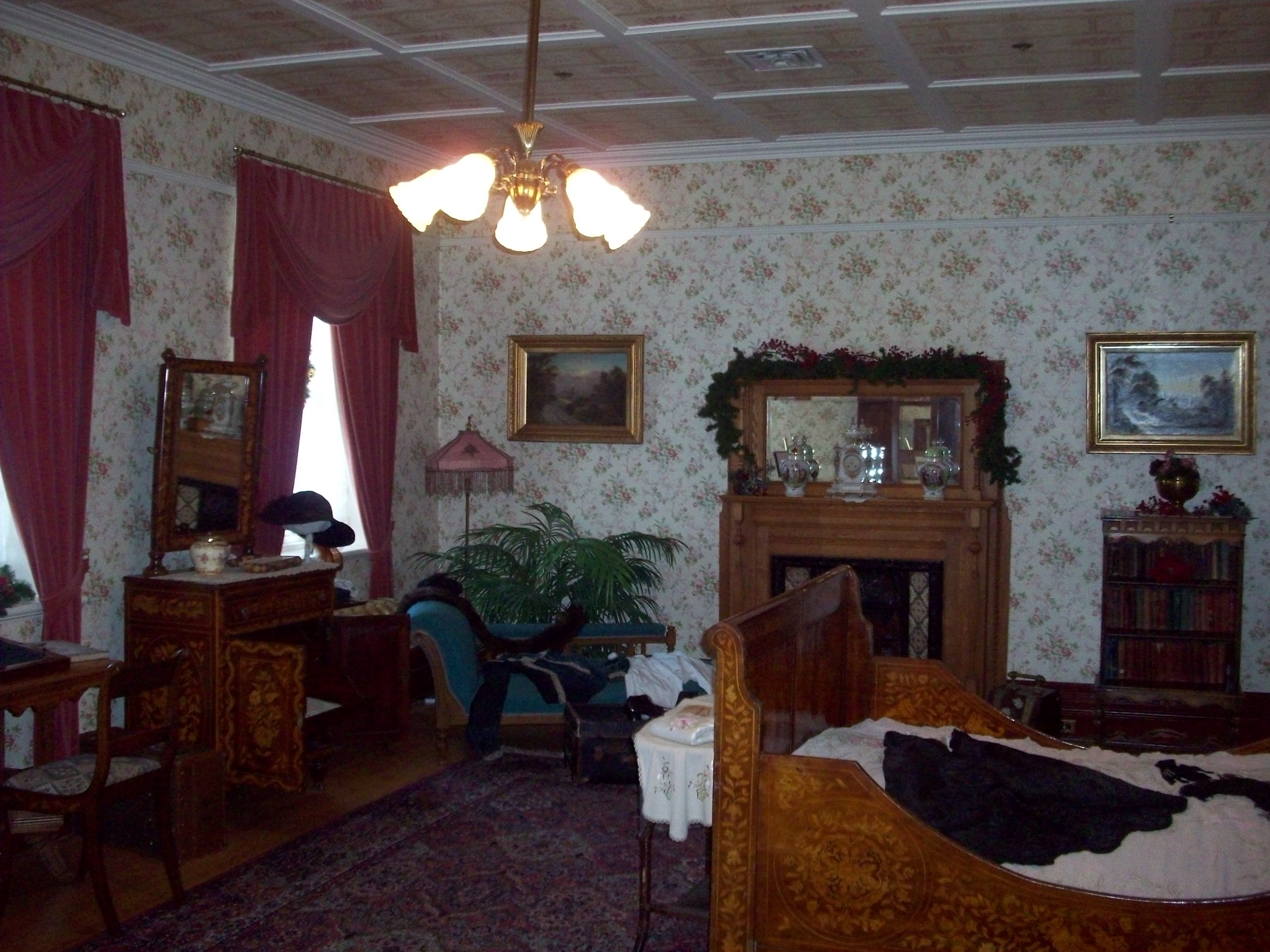
Bedroom

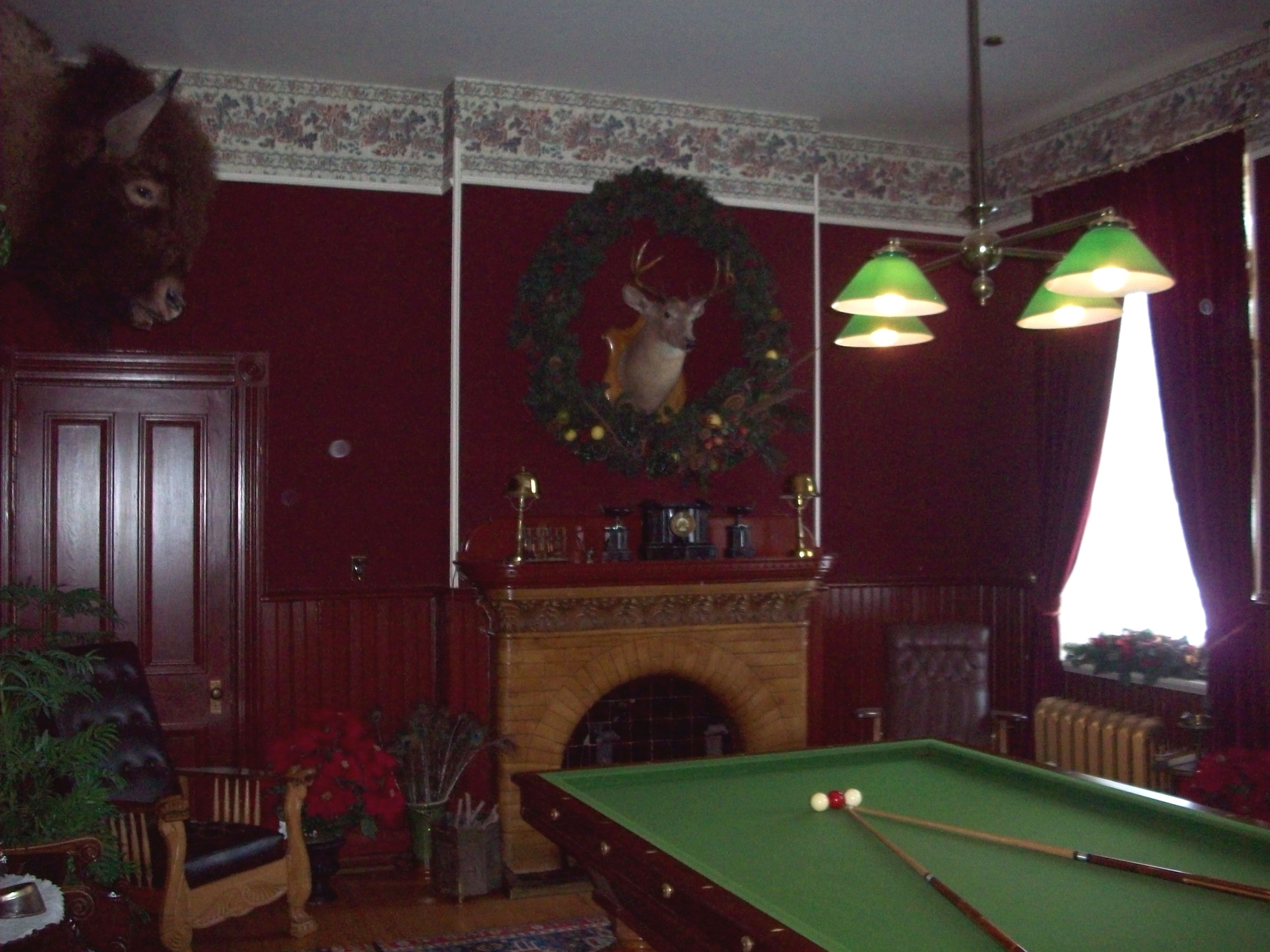
Pool room

== See also ==
- Lieutenant-Governors of Saskatchewan
- Monarchy in Saskatchewan
- Government Houses of Canada
- Government Houses of the British Empire
- Saskatchewan Legislative Building
- Royal eponyms in Canada—locales in Canada named for royalty akin to Queen Elizabeth II Wing at Government House
