= List of current viceregal representatives in Commonwealth realms =

Extraterritorial representatives of King Charles III

The royal cypher of King Charles III, surmounted by the Tudor Crown

Charles III reigns as king of 15 independent countries known as the Commonwealth realms. He resides primarily in the oldest and most populous realm, the United Kingdom, and is represented in the other countries by the following viceregal representatives. The monarch is also represented in each of the Canadian provinces, Australian states, British overseas territories, Crown dependencies, and the states in free association with New Zealand.

== Commonwealth realms ==
=== Governors-general ===
| Country | Governor-general | Since | List |
|---|---|---|---|
| Antigua and Barbuda | Sir Rodney Williams | 14 August 2014 | List |
| Australia | Sam Mostyn | 1 July 2024 | List |
| The Bahamas | Dame Cynthia A. Pratt | 1 September 2023 | List |
| Belize | Dame Froyla Tzalam | 27 May 2021 | List |
| Canada | Louise Arbour | 8 June 2026 | List |
| Grenada | Dame Cécile La Grenade | 7 May 2013 | List |
| Jamaica | Sir Patrick Allen | 26 February 2009 | List |
| New Zealand | Dame Cindy Kiro | 21 October 2021 | List |
| Papua New Guinea | Sir Bob Dadae | 28 February 2017 | List |
| Saint Kitts and Nevis | Dame Marcella Liburd | 1 February 2023 | List |
| Saint Lucia | Felix Finisterre (acting) | 1 August 2026 | List |
| Saint Vincent and the Grenadines | Sir Stanley John | 6 January 2026 | List |
| Solomon Islands | Sir David Tiva Kapu | 7 July 2024 | List |
| Tuvalu | Temukisa Auina Penehuro Hauma | 30 September 2026 | List |

== Crown dependencies ==
The Crown dependencies are possessions of the Crown of the United Kingdom, not of the government of the United Kingdom, and the British monarch is head of state, represented by lieutenant governors.

| Dependency | Lieutenant Governor | Since | List |
|---|---|---|---|
| Bailiwick of Guernsey | Sir Richard Cripwell | 15 February 2022 | List |
| Bailiwick of Jersey | Sir Jerry Kyd | 8 October 2022 | List |
| Isle of Man | Sir John Lorimer | 29 September 2021 | List |

== British Overseas Territories ==
In the 14 British Overseas Territories, the King of the United Kingdom is represented by either an administrator, a commissioner, or a governor.

| British Overseas Territory | Viceregal representative | Current holder | Since |
|---|---|---|---|
| Akrotiri and Dhekelia (Cyprus) | Administrator | Tom Bewick | 11 April 2025 |
| Anguilla | Governor | Julia Crouch | 11 September 2023 |
| Bermuda | Governor | Andrew Murdoch | 23 January 2025 |
| British Antarctic Territory | Commissioner | Jane Rumble | February 2025 |
| British Indian Ocean Territory | Commissioner | Nishi Dholakai | 16 December 2024 |
| British Virgin Islands | Governor | Daniel Pruce | 29 January 2024 |
| Cayman Islands | Governor | Jane Owen | 21 April 2023 |
| Falkland Islands | Governor | Colin Martin-Reynolds | 29 July 2025 |
| Gibraltar | Governor | Sir Ben Bathurst | 4 June 2024 |
| Montserrat | Governor | Harriet Cross | 23 April 2025 |
| Pitcairn Islands | Governor | Louise Cantillon | 18 August 2026 |
| Saint Helena, Ascension and Tristan da Cunha | Governor | Nigel Phillips | 13 August 2022 |
| South Georgia and the South Sandwich Islands | Commissioner | Colin Martin-Reynolds | 29 July 2025 |
| Turks and Caicos Islands | Governor | Dileeni Daniel-Selvaratnam | 29 June 2023 |

== States in free association with New Zealand ==
In the Realm of New Zealand, the Cook Islands have a king's representative to represent the King of New Zealand. Niue is entitled to the same, but, under the Niue Constitution Act, the monarch is represented by New Zealand's governor-general, who represents the King of New Zealand.

| Territory | Representative | Since | List |
|---|---|---|---|
| Cook Islands | Sir Tom Marsters | 27 July 2013 | List |
| Niue | Dame Cindy Kiro | 21 October 2021 | List |

== Sub-national representatives ==
=== Australia ===
In the six Australian states, the King of Australia is represented by a governor. As administrators of Australian territories represent the governor-general of Australia, they are not included here.

| State | Governor | Since | List |
|---|---|---|---|
| New South Wales | Margaret Beazley | 2 May 2019 | List |
| Queensland | Jeannette Young | 1 November 2021 | List |
| South Australia | Frances Adamson | 7 October 2021 | List |
| Tasmania | Caroline Wells | 17 June 2026 | List |
| Victoria | Margaret Gardner | 9 August 2023 | List |
| Western Australia | Chris Dawson | 15 July 2022 | List |

=== Canada ===
In the 10 Canadian provinces, the King of Canada is represented by a lieutenant governor. As the commissioners of the Canadian territories are appointed by the Canadian Governor-in-Council (the federal government), rather than the monarch, they are not included here.

| Province | Lieutenant governor | Since | List |
|---|---|---|---|
| Alberta | Salma Lakhani | 26 August 2020 | List |
| British Columbia | Wendy Lisogar-Cocchia | 30 January 2025 | List |
| Manitoba | Anita Neville | 24 October 2022 | List |
| New Brunswick | Louise Imbeault | 22 January 2025 | List |
| Newfoundland and Labrador | Joan Marie Aylward | 14 November 2023 | List |
| Nova Scotia | Michael Savage | 13 December 2024 | List |
| Ontario | Edith Dumont | 14 November 2023 | List |
| Prince Edward Island | Wassim Salamoun | 17 October 2024 | List |
| Quebec | Manon Jeannotte | 25 January 2024 | List |
| Saskatchewan | Bernadette McIntyre | 31 January 2025 | List |

=== Saint Kitts and Nevis ===
On the island of Nevis in the Saint Kitts and Nevis, the King of Saint Kitts and Nevis is represented by a deputy governor-general.

| Island | Deputy Governor-General | Since | List |
|---|---|---|---|
| Nevis | Hyleeta Liburd | 1 September 2018 | List |

== See also ==
- List of Commonwealth heads of government
- List of leaders of dependent territories
- Lord-lieutenant
- List of governors-general of Charles III
