= Clerk of the Senate of Canada =

Office of the Canadian Senate

Clerk of the Senate and Clerk of the Parliaments
- Incumbent; Shaila Anwar since 2024
- Reports to: Speaker of the Senate
- Appointer: Governor General in Council
- Term length: At His Majesty's pleasure
- Formation: 1867
- First holder: John Fennings Taylor Sr
- Salary: $156,500–184,100 (2015)
- Website: Clerk of the Senate and Clerk of the Parliaments

The Clerk of the Senate and Clerk of the Parliaments is the chief clerk and senior administrative officer of the Senate of Canada.

== List of Clerks ==
- 1867–1871 John Fennings Taylor Sr.
- 1871–1883 Robert Le Moine
- 1883–1900 Edouard-Joseph Langevin
- 1900–1917 Samuel-Edmour St-Onge Chapleau
- 1917–1938 Austen Ernest Blount
- 1938–1955 L. Clare Moyer
- 1955–1968 John Forbes MacNeill
- 1968–1981 Robert Fortier
- 1981–1989 Charles A. Lussier
- 1989–1994 Gordon Barnhart
- 1994–2009 Paul Bélisle
- 2009–2015 Gary W. O'Brien
- 2015–2017 Charles Robert (Interim)
- 2017–2018 Nicole Proulx (Interim; first female clerk)
- 2018—2020 Richard Denis (Interim)
- 2020—2024 Gérald Lafrenière (Interim)
- May 7, 2024 — present Shaila Anwar

== See also ==
- Clerk of the House of Commons (Canada)
- Clerk of the Parliaments
