= Henry William Newlands =

Canadian politician

The Honourable Henry William Newlands
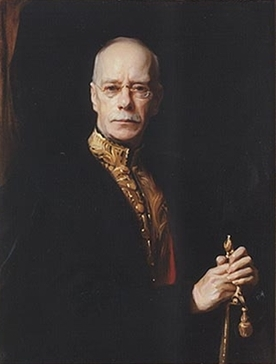
- Henry William Newlands during his time as Lieutenant Governor of Saskatchewan.

4th Lieutenant Governor of Saskatchewan
- In office February 17, 1921 – March 31, 1931
- Monarch: George V
- Governors General: The Duke of Devonshire; The Lord Byng of Vimy; The Viscount Willingdon
- Premier: William Melville Martin; Charles Avery Dunning; James G. Gardiner; J.T.M. Anderson
- Preceded by: Richard Stuart Lake
- Succeeded by: Hugh Edwin Munroe

Personal details
- Born: March 19, 1862 Dartmouth, Nova Scotia
- Died: August 9, 1954 (aged 92) St. Thomas, Ontario, Canada
- Occupation: Lawyer, judge, and administrator of justice
- Profession: Politician

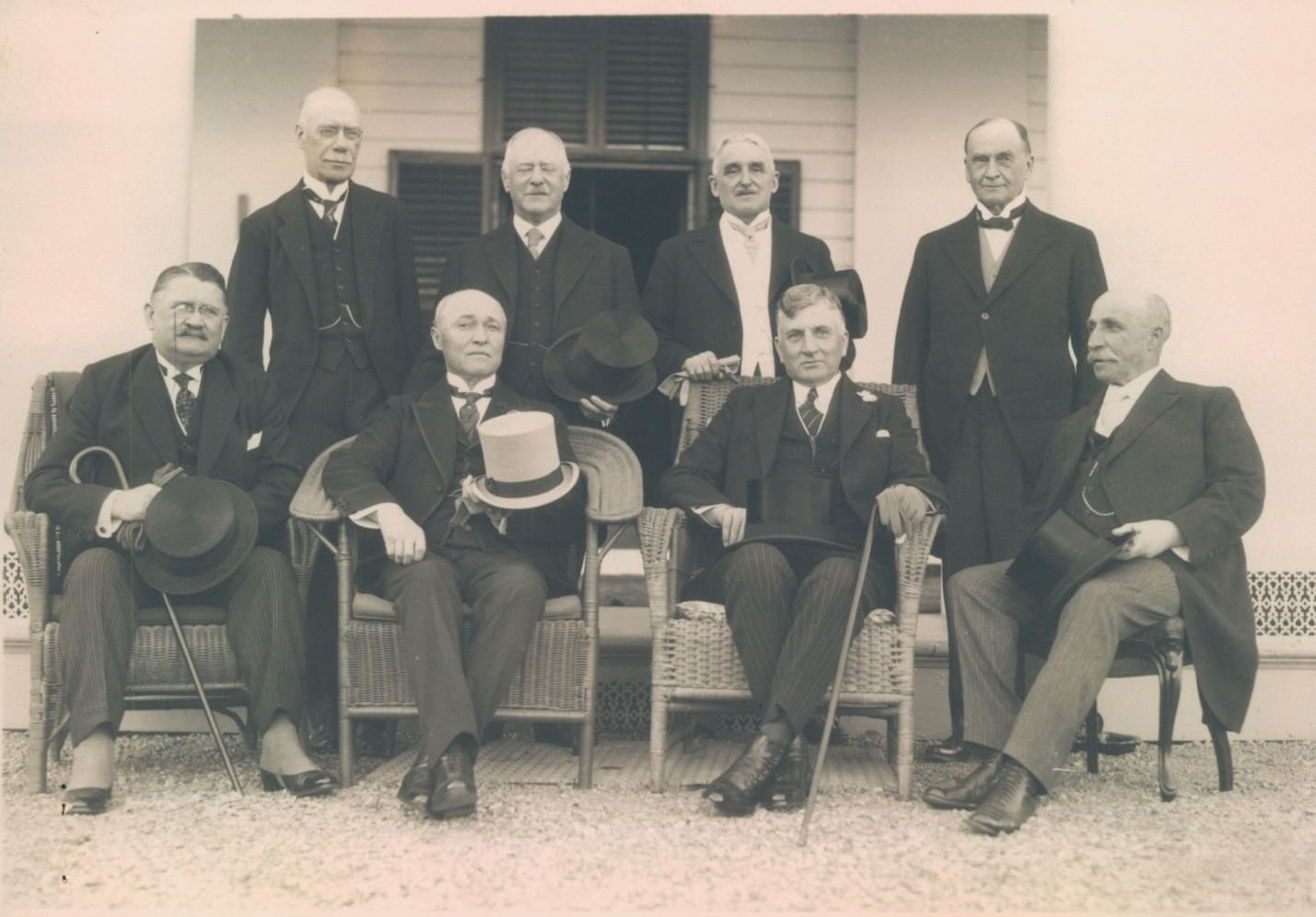
Henry William Newlands, standing at far left.

Henry William Newlands (March 19, 1862 – August 9, 1954) was a Canadian politician and lawyer, who served as the fourth lieutenant governor of Saskatchewan, 1921 to 1931.

== Biography ==
Born in March 1862 in Dartmouth, Nova Scotia, Henry William Newlands was the son of James and Henrietta Newlands, and was educated in Halifax. Newlands was called to the Nova Scotia Bar in 1883, after which he would go on to have an important role in the domain of law. That same year, he moved to Western Canada, residing briefly in Winnipeg.

In 1885, Newlands moved to Prince Albert, Saskatchewan where he practiced law. He also served as inspector of land titles offices in the Northwest Territories as well as law adviser to the Yukon Executive Council. In 1902, Newlands served as Acting Commissioner for several months when Commissioner James Hamilton Ross was elected MP for Yukon in the House of Commons of Canada.

On February 5, 1904, he was named a Justice of the Supreme Court of the Northwest Territories, and continued to hold on to the job following the creation of the province of Saskatchewan in 1905.

On March 2, 1918, Newlands was named a Judge of the Saskatchewan Court of Appeal. Three years later, Newlands was appointed Lieutenant-Governor of Saskatchewan and would remain in office for a decade.

== Personal life ==
Newlands married Mary Paterson Stewart; the couple having 2 daughters. He died in St. Thomas, Ontario in 1954.
