= W. Thomas Molloy =

Lieutenant Governor of Saskatchewan from 2018 to 2019

The Honourable W. Thomas Molloy OC SOM QC

22nd Lieutenant Governor of Saskatchewan
- In office March 21, 2018 – July 2, 2019
- Monarch: Elizabeth II
- Governor General: Julie Payette
- Premier: Scott Moe
- Preceded by: Vaughn Schofield
- Succeeded by: Russell Mirasty

Personal details
- Born: William Thomas Molloy; July 27, 1940 Saskatoon, Saskatchewan
- Died: July 2, 2019 (aged 78) Saskatoon, Saskatchewan
- Education: University of Saskatchewan; St. Thomas More College
- Profession: Lawyer

William Thomas Molloy OC SOM QC (July 27, 1940 – July 2, 2019) was a Canadian lawyer, treaty negotiator, and Chancellor of the University of Saskatchewan. He was the 22nd lieutenant governor of Saskatchewan, from 2018 to 2019.

Molloy was appointed Lieutenant Governor by the Governor General of Canada, Julie Payette, on the advice of Prime Minister Justin Trudeau on January 22, 2018, to succeed Vaughn Solomon Schofield. He was sworn in on March 21, 2018, at the Saskatchewan Legislative Building. He died of pancreatic cancer just over a year later, on July 2, 2019. The Province of Saskatchewan accorded Molloy a state memorial service on July 13, 2019.

== Biography ==
Born in Saskatoon, Saskatchewan, on July 27, 1940, Molloy received a Bachelor of Arts degree from St. Thomas More College and a Bachelor of Laws degree from the University of Saskatchewan both in 1964. He was called to the Bar in both Saskatchewan and Alberta. He was counsel with the Saskatoon law firm of Molloy Negotiations.

He was the Chief Negotiator for the Government of Canada in the Nunavut Land Claim Agreement, and for the Nisga'a Final Agreement.

He was the author of the book, The World Is Our Witness: The Historic Journey of the Nisga'a into Canada.

In 1996, he was made an Officer of the Order of Canada for "his integrity, commitment to a just settlement and personable rapport". In 2012, he was made a Member of the Saskatchewan Order of Merit.

On January 22, 2018, Prime Minister Justin Trudeau announced Molloy's appointment as the next Lieutenant Governor of Saskatchewan, to succeed Vaughn Solomon Schofield. He was formally installed on March 21, 2018.

On May 7, 2019, Molloy's office announced that he had been diagnosed with pancreatic cancer and was stepping away from his post to undergo treatment, with his duties temporarily being taken over by Robert G. Richards, Chief Justice of Saskatchewan. He died of the disease on July 2, 2019.

On July 13, 2019, the Province of Saskatchewan accorded a state memorial service to Molloy in Saskatoon. Amongst those attending were the Governor General, Julie Payette; the Premier of Saskatchewan, Scott Moe; the federal Minister of Public Safety, Ralph Goodale; former Premier Roy Romanow, who was a classmate of Molloy at the University of Saskatchewan; and Perry Bellegarde, National Chief of the Assembly of First Nations.

== Honours and Arms ==
=== Honours ===
- Officer of the Order of Canada
- Knight of the Order of St John
- Member of the Saskatchewan Order of Merit

=== Coat of Arms ===
Coat of arms of W. Thomas Molloy
| Notes Granted 15 May 2019. Crest A garb Or charged with a rose Gules barbed and seeded Proper and issuant from an ancient crown Purpure. Escutcheon Tierced in pairle reversed Or Vert and Purpure on a plate two scrolls in saltire Azure. Supporters Two lions guardant Or each gorged of a collar Azure pendent therefrom a rose Gules barbed and seeded standing on a mount of Western red lilies roses and white lilies Proper. Motto Trust Understanding and Patience |

Academic offices
| Preceded by Peggy McKercher | Chancellor of the University of Saskatchewan; 2001–2007 | Succeeded by Dr Vera Pezer |
