= Bernadette McIntyre =

Lieutenant Governor of Saskatchewan since 2025

Her Honour the Honourable Bernadette McIntyre SOM

24th Lieutenant Governor of Saskatchewan
- Incumbent
- Assumed office January 31, 2025
- Monarch: Charles III
- Governors General: Mary Simon; Louise Arbour
- Premier: Scott Moe
- Preceded by: Russell Mirasty

Personal details
- Born: February 1958 (age 68) Regina, Saskatchewan, Canada
- Spouse: Rich

Bernadette McIntyre SOM (born February 1958) is a Canadian public administrator serving as the 24th lieutenant governor of Saskatchewan. She was appointed by the prime minister of Canada, Justin Trudeau, on December 6, 2024. McIntyre was sworn in on January 31, 2025 at the Saskatchewan Legislative Building, officially taking over from outgoing lieutenant governor Russell Mirasty.

As the lieutenant governor, McIntyre serves as the viceregal representative of Charles III of Canada in Saskatchewan. Her official duties include granting royal assent to Saskatchewan laws, as well as the summoning and dissolution of the Saskatchewan Legislature.

Prior to becoming lieutenant governor, McIntyre worked as the CEO for the Wascana Centre Authority and held positions with Saskatchewan Government Insurance. She is also an avid volunteer in Regina, helping organize several major curling events, including the 2006 Tim Hortons Brier when she became the first woman president of a Brier Host Committee. She was inducted into the Saskatchewan Sports Hall of Fame in 2023. She curled recreationally at the Highland Curling Club in Regina.

McIntyre grew up in Bethune, Saskatchewan. She is the daughter of Eleanor, a teacher, and John, a farmer.

Order of precedence
Preceded by Wassim Salamoun as Lieutenant Governor of Prince Edward Island	Order of Precedence of Canada as Lieutenant Governor of Saskatchewan	Succeeded by Salma Lakhani as Lieutenant Governor of Alberta
