= Lieutenant Governor of Saskatchewan =

Viceregal representative in Saskatchewan of the Canadian monarch

- Emblem of the Lieutenant Governor

- Standard of the Lieutenant Governor of Saskatchewan
- Incumbent; Bernadette McIntyre since 31 January 2025
- Viceroy
- Style: Her Honour the Honourable
- Appointer: The governor general on the advice of the prime minister
- Term length: At the governor general's pleasure
- Formation: September 1, 1905
- First holder: Amédée E. Forget
- Website: www.ltgov.sk.ca

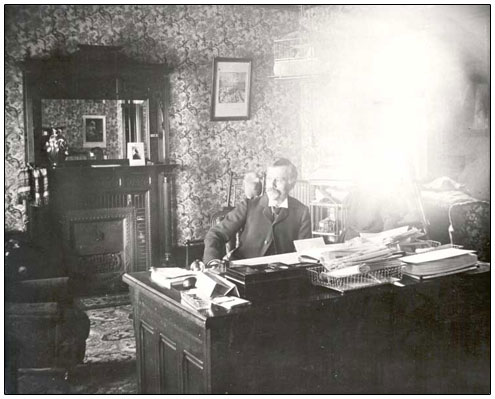
Lieutenant Governor Amédée E. Forget in his office at Government House, 1898

The lieutenant governor of Saskatchewan (/lɛfˈtɛnənt/) is the representative in Saskatchewan of the monarch, who operates distinctly within the province but is also shared equally with the ten other jurisdictions of Canada. The lieutenant governor of Saskatchewan is appointed in the same manner as the other provincial viceroys in Canada and is similarly tasked with carrying out most of the monarch's constitutional and ceremonial duties. The current lieutenant governor is Bernadette McIntyre, who was sworn in on January 31, 2025.

== Role and presence ==
The lieutenant governor of Saskatchewan is vested with a number of governmental duties and is also expected to undertake various ceremonial roles. For instance, the lieutenant governor acts as patron, honorary president, or an honorary member of certain Saskatchewan institutions, such as the Saskatchewan Music Festival Association, the Saskatchewan Craft Council, and the provincial poet laureate program. Further, Saskatchewan's lieutenant governor acts, by law, as the visitor to both the University of Saskatchewan and the University of Regina, and under special circumstances may be called upon in this role, as happened in the University Crisis of 1919 at the University of Saskatchewan. The lieutenant governor, him or herself a member and Chancellor of the order, will induct deserving individuals into the Saskatchewan Order of Merit and, upon installation, automatically becomes a Knight or Dame of Justice and the Vice-Prior in Saskatchewan of the Most Venerable Order of the Hospital of Saint John of Jerusalem. The viceroy further presents other provincial honours and decorations, as well as various awards that are named for and presented by the lieutenant governor; these are generally created in partnership with another government or charitable organization and linked specifically to their cause. These honours are presented at official ceremonies, which count amongst hundreds of other engagements the lieutenant governor partakes in each year, either as host or guest of honour; in 2006, the lieutenant governor undertook 250 engagements and 450 in 2007.

Standard of the lieutenant governor of Saskatchewan from 1906 to 1981

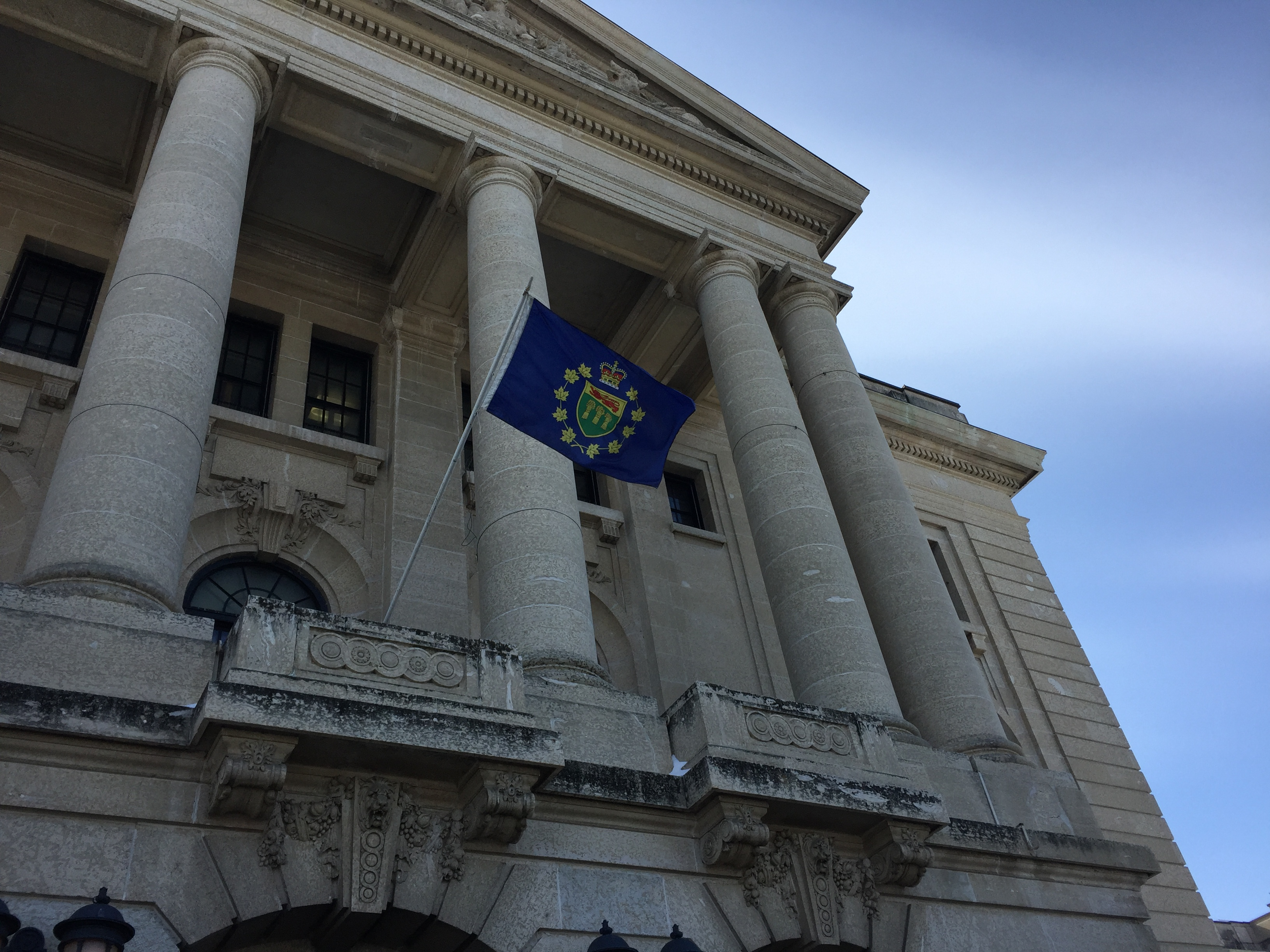
The Vice Regal Standard over the Saskatchewan Legislative Building at the Installation of W. Thomas Molloy

At these events, the lieutenant governor's presence is marked by the lieutenant governor's standard, consisting of a blue field bearing the escutcheon of the Arms of His Majesty in Right of Saskatchewan surmounted by a crown and surrounded by ten gold maple leaves, symbolizing the ten provinces of Canada. Within Saskatchewan, the lieutenant governor also follows only the sovereign in the province's order of precedence, preceding even other members of the Canadian Royal Family and the Queen's federal representative. The former lieutenant governors of Saskatchewan are also honoured in official portraits collected together in the dedicated Qu'Appelle Gallery in the Saskatchewan Legislative Building.

== History ==
The lieutenant governor of Saskatchewan came into being in 1905, upon Saskatchewan's entry into Canadian Confederation, and evolved from the earlier position of lieutenant governor of the North-West Territories. Since that date, 24 lieutenant governors have served the province, amongst whom were notable firsts, such as Sylvia Fedoruk – the first female lieutenant governor of the province – and Russell Mirasty, the first Indigenous person to hold the office. The shortest mandate by a lieutenant governor of Saskatchewan was Thomas Miller, from 27 February 1945 to 20 June 1945, while the longest was Henry William Newlands, from 18 February 1921 to 30 March 1931.

It was in 1929 that the lieutenant governor of Saskatchewan's personal discretion was required in the exercise of the royal prerogative, when Henry Newlands had to select a new premier after James Garfield Gardiner lost the confidence of the Legislative Assembly and the opposing Progressive Conservative Party had managed to form a coalition with the Progressive Party and independent members of the assembly. With the 1944 election of the Co-operative Commonwealth Federation Party to a majority in the Legislative Assembly, the office of the lieutenant governor was targeted for spending cutbacks. Government House was closed and the viceroy given only a small office at the Hotel Saskatchewan as a replacement, and guards of honour and playing of the Viceregal Salute were dispensed with. This trend continued, due to lack of initiative rather than hostility towards the Crown, until the 1980s when the viceroy's honours were restored and Government House was saved from demolition.

== See also ==
- List of lieutenant governors of Saskatchewan
- List of lieutenant governors of the Northwest Territories (when Regina was capital)
- Lieutenant governors of Canada
- Monarchy in the Canadian provinces
- Government of Saskatchewan
