= Timeline of First Nations history in Canada =

Dynamic timeline of First Nations history

The history of the First Nations in Canada is the prehistory and history of present-day Canada's Indigenous peoples from the earliest times to the present day. The prehistory settlement of the Americas is a subject of ongoing debate. First Nation's oral histories and traditional knowledge, combined with new methodologies and technologies—used by archaeologists, linguists, and other researchers—produce new—and sometimes conflicting—evidence.

Many First Nations myths refer to the habitation of North America from time immemorial. There are a number of myths about the world in general and the place of First Nations within that history.

== Pre-contact ==
The 1996 Report by the Royal Commission on Aboriginal People described four stages in Canadian history that overlap and occur at different times in different regions: 1) Pre-contact – Different Worlds – Contact; 2) Early Colonies (1500–1763); 3) Displacement and Assimilation (1764–1969); and 4) Renewal to Constitutional Entrenchment (2018).

=== 40,900 to 40,000 BP ===
- 40,000 BP The earliest record of Rangifer tarandus caribou (which includes five subspecies:boreal woodland caribou, barren-ground caribou) in North America
  is from a 1.6 million year old tooth found in the Yukon Territory; other early records include 45,500-year-old cranial fragment from the Yukon and a 40,600-year-old antler from Quebec (Gordon 2003). The ancestral origins of caribou prior to the last glaciation (Wisconsin), which occurred approximately 80,000 to 10,000 years ago, are not well understood, however, during the last glaciation it is known that caribou were abundant and distributed in non-glaciated refugia both north and south of the Laurentide Ice Sheet.
  — Banfield 1961, Martin and Klein 1984 cited in Wilkerson 2010

=== 30,000 to 20,000 BP ===
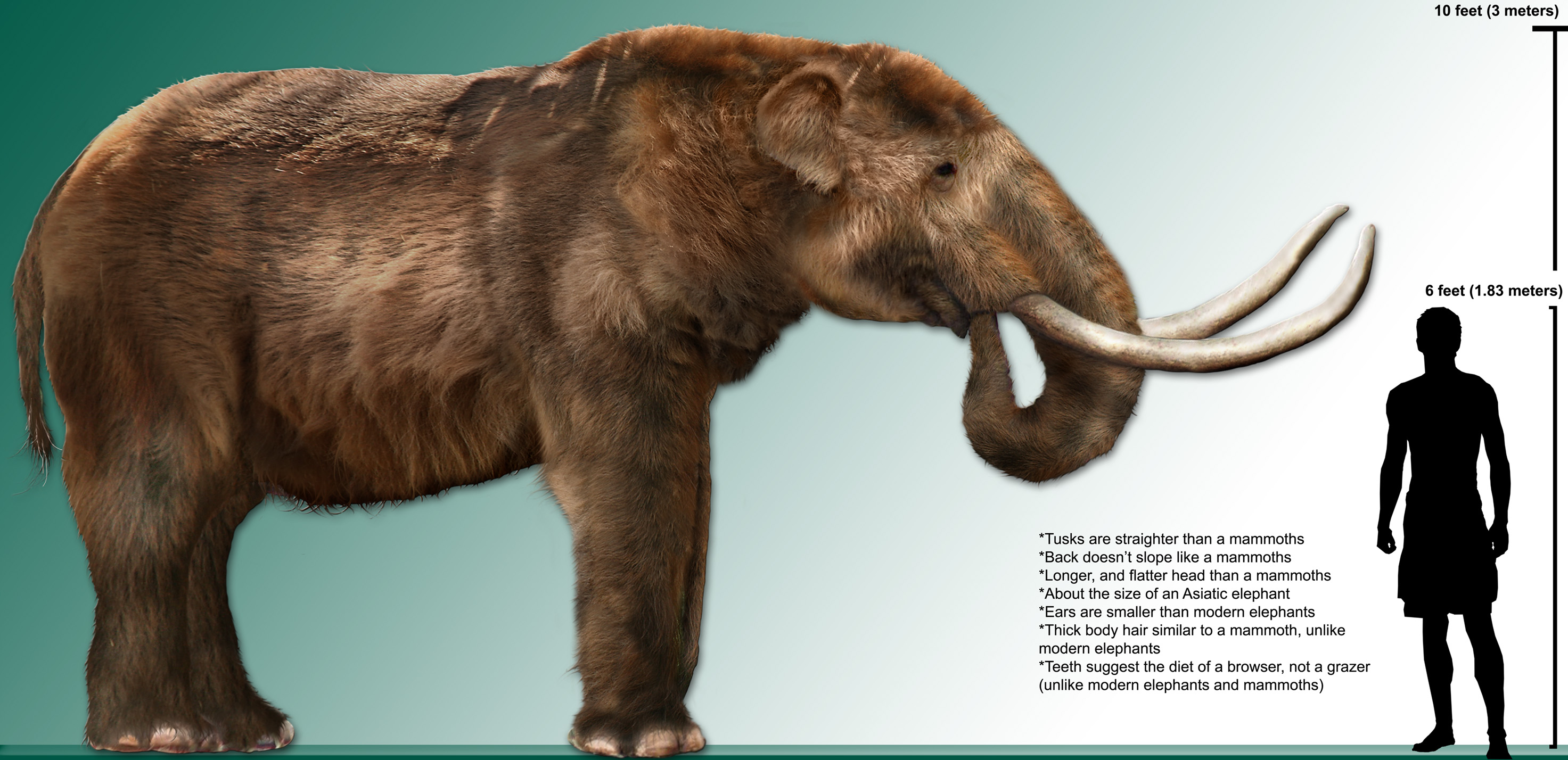
The Mammut americanum (American mastodon) became extinct around 12,000–9,000 years ago due to human-related activities, climate change, or a combination of both. See Quaternary extinction event and Holocene extinction.

- There may have been human habitation in the Americas prior to the Clovis culture, according to some archaeologists. Carbon dating of charcoal from the Topper Site near Allendale County, South Carolina, was said to have been an example of this theory, according to Albert Goodyear of the South Carolina Institute of Archaeology and Anthropology. However, these deposits may have been made by forest fires. Not all archaeologists agree on dating for the Old Crow and Topper digs.
- Ice-free corridor running north and south through modern-day Alberta and the continental glacier called Laurentide Ice Sheet. In the 1950s, stone tools were found in the Grimshaw, Bow River and in Lethbridge Alberta, under glacial sand and gravel; they are believed to be pre-glacial and may indicate nomadic humans occupied the area. Fragments from a child's skull were found in 1961 near Taber, Alberta; some believe the discovery of the skull was evidence of the existence of one of the oldest inhabitants in what is now Alberta. However, Wilson and Harvey revised the carbon dating of the skull to the Holocene not the Pleistocene age. Conclusions reached in Alberta on dates have not been accepted by the entire archaeology community.
- Mammoth bones, believed to have been chipped by humans, are found at the Yukon's Bluefish Caves controversially suggested that human occupation radiocarbon dates to 24,000 years Before Present (BP) based on radiocarbon dating of animal remains, but these dates are contested due to the uncertain stratigraphic context of the archaeological remains relative to the dated animal remains. There are three small caves in the area.

=== Paleo-Indians period ===
- 20,000 BP Radiocarbon dating of a caribou bone flesher found by Irving and Harington in the Old Crow River Basin placed it at late Holocene period. Arctic archaeologist William N. Irving (1927–1987), working closely with local Old Crow residents, focused his research on Crow basin and the Bluefish caves in the surrounding mountains (1966–1983). Old Crow Flats and Bluefish Caves are some of the earliest known sites of human habitation in Canada. The Old Crow Flats and basin was one of the areas in Canada untouched by glaciations during the Pleistocene Ice ages, thus it served as a pathway and refuge for ice age plants and animals.

=== 14,900 to 14,000 BP ===
- 14,000 BP The Central Coast of British Columbia's Heiltsuk Nation's oral history included the description of land on the coast that provided a refuge for early inhabitants during the ice age. Archaeologists unearthed what appears to be that settlement on Triquet Island in a 2016 dig supported by the Hakai Institute. In November 2016, tests results showed that the hearth was approximately 14,000 years old, making it "one of the oldest human settlements" unearthed in North America. University of Victoria's Brigit Katz who was a PhD student and a Hakai Institute associate listed some of the findings—"fish hooks, a hand drill for igniting fires, a wooden device for launching projectiles and a cache of stone tools near the hearth". Katz presented the teams' findings at the April 2017 meeting of the Society for American Archeology.

=== 12,900 to 12, 000 BP ===
- 12,000 BP According to R. Cole Harris, prehistoric trade routes map show that Knife River silica was traded in all directions including the route north to what is now Canada.
- 12,000-11,000 BP According to internationally renowned archaeologist George Carr Frison Bison occidentalis and Bison antiquus, an extinct sub-species of the smaller present-day bison, survived the Late Pleistocene period, between about 12,000 and 11,000 years ago, dominated by glaciation (the Wisconsin glaciation in North America), when many other megafauna became extinct. Plains and Rocky Mountain First Nations depended on these bison as their major food source. Frison noted that the "oldest, well-documented bison kills by pedestrian human hunters in North America date to about 11,000 years ago."

=== 11,900 to 11,000 BP ===
- 11,200 to 10,500 BP Archaeological evidence, fluted spear points used for hunting bison and caribou found across Canada
- 11,000 BP The Crowsnest Pass is the richest archaeological zone in the Canadian Rocky Mountains. The oldest relics are stone tools found on a rock ridge outside Frank, Alberta, from the Clovis culture, 11,000 years before present. Other sites include chert quarries on the Livingstone ridge dating back to 1000 BC.
  Crowsnest Pass
- 11,000 BP Archaeological evidence of different cultural campsites on Asian and North American sides of Beringia.
- 11,000 BP The Folsom tradition, also known as Folsom culture, or Lindenmeier culture, replaced previous Clovis ways of life.
- 11,000 BP - 6,000 BP The Plano cultures existed in modern-day Canada during the Paleo-Indian or Archaic period between 11,000 BP and 6,000 BP. The Plano cultures originated in the plains, but extended far beyond, from the Atlantic coast to British Columbia and as far north as the Northwest Territories. "Early Plano culture occurs south of the North Saskatchewan River in Saskatchewan and in the foothills of the Rocky Mountains north to the Peace River Valley of Alberta and adjacent British Columbia. At this time, most of Manitoba was still covered by Glacial Lake Agassiz and associated glacial ice." The Plano cultures are characterised by a range of unfluted projectile point tools collectively called Plano points and like the Folsom people generally hunted bison antiquus, but made even greater use of techniques to force stampedes off of a cliff or into a constructed corral. Their diets also included pronghorn, elk, deer, raccoon and coyote. To better manage their food supply, they preserved meat in berries and animal fat and stored it in containers made of hides. Bison herds were attracted to the grasslands and parklands in the western region. Around 9,000 BP as retreating glaciers created newly released lake regions, the expansion of plant and animal communities expanded north and east, and tundra caribou and boreal woodland caribou replaced bison as the major prey animal.
- 11,000 BP Charlie Lake Cave Archaeological site report HbRf-39 states: "...the importance of this site lies in its exceptionally long and continuous cultural, sedimentary and faunal sequence, which seems to have accumulated steadily without erosional episodes for at least 11,000 years." The lowest (earliest) level containing stone artifacts, including a fluted point, six retouched flakes and a small stone bead has been dated to 10,770±120 years BP. With an average age of about 10,500, component 1 at Charlie Lake cave near Fort St. John is the oldest dated evidence of man in the province, and one of the oldest in Canada. The Dane-zaa First Nation (Beaver) are the descendants of these early people. Driver wrote in 2005 that, "Charlie Lake Cave is situated right in the middle of the ice-free corridor region. However, evidence from the site suggests that people may not have moved from north to south down the corridor, but instead may have moved from south to north, following herds of bison. This is suggested from DNA analysis of the bison remains, which indicates that some of the bison found at Charlie Lake originated in the southern regions of the North American continent. In addition, the fluted point found at Charlie Lake Cave is similar to points found at the Indian Creek and Mill Iron sites in Montana. These sites were occupied before Charlie Lake Cave, which suggests that perhaps the tool technology was developed in the south, and brought to Charlie Lake Cave at a later time when the tool makers and their descendants moved north."
Charlie Lake Caves
- 11,000 BP Salmon-based Northwest Coast culture established.
- 11,000 BP Prehistoric trade routes map show that Batza Tena obsidian was at the center of trade routes by 11000 BP. Obsidian was valued for it cutting edge and its beauty. Archaeological sites revealed obsidian was traded far from its place of origin.
- 11,000 BP "Archaeological records confirm that there were Aboriginal campsites in New Brunswick dating back approximately 11,000 years."
- 11,000 BP Paleo-indians "reached Maine by over 11,000 years ago and Debert, Nova Scotia not many years later." The Debert Palaeo-Indian Site was designated a National Historic Site of Canada in 1974.
  Debert in Nova Scotia.

=== 10,900 to 10,000 BP ===
- 10,800 to ca. 9,000 BP Early human occupation of the Vermilion Lakes, Alberta area has been dated from 10,800 to ca. 9,000 BP.
- 10,500 - 7,750 BP The Early Precontact Period (10,500–7,750 years ago)
  is characterized by archaeological complexes containing stone projectile points of triangular, fluted, lanceolate, or stemmed forms, presumably used with throwing and stabbing spears. At least five cultural complexes occur in Alberta, including Clovis and its derivatives, Windust, Cascade, Cody, and Plains-Mountain. These groups appear to have been primarily big-game hunters who often moved over vast areas during their annual rounds while visiting preferred resources. Their stone tools can be found great distances from the sources of their raw material.
  — Meyer
- 10,500 BP Prehistoric trade routes map show that Wyoming obsidian was at the center of trade routes from 10500 BP to AD 500 including the route north to what is now Canada.
  - Dane-zaa The Dane-zaa (ᑕᓀᖚ, also spelled Dunneza, or Tsattine, and historically often referred to as the Beaver tribe by Europeans) are a First Nation of the large Athapaskan language group; their traditional territory is around the Peace River of the provinces of Alberta and British Columbia, Canada. Recent archaeological evidence establishes that the area of Charlie Lake north of Fort St John has been continuously occupied for 10,500 years by varying cultures of indigenous peoples.
  - "Other sites in the province from this time period include the Charlie Lake Cave site near Fort St. John, dating to 10,500 BP."

=== 10,000 BP ===
- 10,000 BP In a study published in Nature in 2016, scientists argued that by 10,000 years ago, the ice-free corridor in what is now Alberta and B.C. "was gradually taken over by a boreal forest dominated by spruce and pine trees" and that "Clovis people likely came from the south, not the north, perhaps following wild animals such as bison."
  - The inhabitants of Quilá Naquitz cave in Oaxaca, Mexico, cultivated and initially domesticated Cucurbita Pepo between 10,000 and 8000 calendar years ago (9000 to 7000 carbon-14 years before the present). This "predates maize, beans, and other directly dated domesticates in the Americas by more than 4000 years."
  - The site of what is now Banff National Park, Alberta, Canada, has been occupied by people for 10,000 years. Over 700 archaeological sites (both pre-contact and historic) have been recorded. These sites contain artifacts, evidence of the presence of Aboriginal campsites, butchering sites, quarries, mining towns and historical dumps.
  - 10,000 BP to 8,000 BP The Stó:lo called their traditional territory in the Fraser River Valley,S'ólh Téméxw. The first traces of people living in the Fraser Valley date from 8,000 to 10,000 years ago. There is archaeological evidence of a settlement in the lower Fraser Canyon(called "the Milliken site") and a seasonal encampment ("the Glenrose Cannery site") near the mouth of the Fraser River.
  - The Ediza quarry was the oldest of several obsidian quarries in British Columbia. Ediza obsidian was in use from 10,000 BP until European contact. Fladmark argued that trade in that region of BC is at least 10,000 years old.*
  - Human occupation in Prince George, British Columbia dates to 9,000 to 10,000 BP.

=== 9,900 to 9,000 BP ===
- 9,700 BP Human occupation in a site near Namu on Vancouver Island, dates to 9,700 BP.
- 9,000 BP to 7,000 BP During the Holocene climatic optimum or Hypsithermal period, about "9000 years ago the climate of western North America started becoming hotter and drier before reaching a maximum warmth and dryness about 7000 years ago." Archaeological sites from this period in Alberta include Boss Hill, Bitteroot, Mummy Cave, at sites near Calgary, Crowsnest Pass, and in the Cypress Hills (Canada) and Porcupine Hills, on the Manitoba Escarpment, which was the shoreline of the glacial Lake Agassiz.
  9000 BP Manitoba archaeological sites
  - The Milliken site in the Fraser Canyon dated to 9,000 BP.

=== 8,900 to 8,000 BP ===
- 8,500 BP The Paskapoo Slopes of Broadcast Hill as well as in Tuscany, downtown Calgary, Alberta, and Hawkwood, are the oldest archaeological sites in the city of Calgary, dating back to about 8,500 radiocarbon years BP. In "pre-contact times, First Nation peoples used the area extensively as the high escarpment ridge offered unobstructed views of the Bow River Valley below and the prairies beyond. The river banks were used as winter camps."
- 8,250 BP Gore Creek site near Kamloops dates to 8250 BP. The early occupants of the area were likely fairly mobile hunter-gatherers due to the lack of dependable resources.
- 8,000 BP Prehistoric trade routes map show that Keewatin silica was at the center of trade routes.

=== 6,900 to 6,000 BP ===
- 6,800 years ago The eruption of Mount Mazama deposits volcanic ash over much of present-day western Canada. Archaeologists use the layer of Mazama ash to date sites.
- 6,000 years ago The flat pink granite of what is now Whiteshell Provincial Park in southeast Manitoba along the Manitoba-Ontario boundary, was used for petroform making by First Nation peoples, at the Tie Creek Boulder Site, for example. There is also archaeological evidence of ancient copper trading going east to Lake Superior, prehistoric quartz mining, and stone tool making in the area. For thousands of years aboriginal peoples – Ojibway, or Anishinaabe various other groups before them, used the area for harvesting wild rice, hunting, fishing, trade, and dwelling. The Whiteshell Natural History Museum opened in 1960. The name of the park is derived from the cowrie shells that were used in ceremonies by the Ojibway, Anishinaabe, and Midewiwin.
  Whiteshell Provincial Park

=== 5,900 to 5,000 BP ===
- 5,000 years ago Porcupine Hills/Oldman River basin pattern of bison driving, trapping and processing dating back over the past five thousand years or more, is characterized by the use of escarpments, slopes, benches and ravines for trapping and processing bison. The bison were gathered from the grazing lands in the uplands to the south and west and moved by a system of drive lanes to preferred killing and processing locales along Paskapoo Slopes. Archaeologist Brian O.K. The northern extension of the Porcupine Hills/Oldman River basin pattern has been identified in Calgary, Alberta where forty-nine archaeological pre-contact Native archaeological sites were found in the East Paskapoo Slopes. These sites ranged in type from kill/processing sites of buffalo to camps and sweat pits. First Nation peoples used the area extensively as the high escarpment ridge offered unobstructed views of the Bow River Valley below and the prairies beyond. The river banks were used as winter camps. As well, the steep cliffs provided ideal conditions for the buffalo jump, a unique method of hunting bison that is similar in complexity to the UNESCO World Heritage Site Head-Smashed-In Buffalo Jump.
  - "Oxbow technology originally entered the Canadian grasslands 5000 years ago from both the southwestern foothills and the southeastern prairies. The development of adaptive strategies involving seasonal use of the boreal forest and parkland zones allowed the eventual full-time colonization of these zones by Oxbow groups."
- 5,000 BP to 360 BP During the Archaic Period, a vast network of village sites and 15 ancient burial mounds were built in what was once called Manitou Mounds National Historic Site. Now called the Kay-Nah-Chi-Wah-Nung National Historic Site of Canada, it is one of the "most significant centres of early habitation and ceremonial burial in Canada." The Kay-Nah-Chi-Wah-Nung Historical Centre, or Manitou Mounds, is Canada's premier concentration of ancient burial mounds. It is on a river stretch known as Long Sault Rapids on the north side of Rainy River, approximately 54 kilometres (34 miles) east of Fort Frances, in the Rainy River District of Northwestern Ontario, Canada off highway 11. It was designated as a National Historic Site of Canada in 1969.

=== 4,900 to 4,000 BP ===
- 4,500 BP Archaeologists say that Palaeoeskimo peoples——Paleo-Inuit, Tuniit/Sivullirmiut——had a "common ancestry based in northeast Asia and Alaska beginning about 4500 BP" "Independence I, which is found in portions of Greenland and Labrador from 4000 to 3500 BP."
  - "Salish woven objects have been excavated by archaeologists at Musqueam. In the same area weaving tools have been found."
- 4,300 BP In 1997, in the Yukon, a 4,300-year-old dart shaft was discovered as the ice receded.
- 4,000 BP The oldest dated occupation in the area of what is now known as L'Anse aux Meadows, Newfoundland was 6,000 years ago. Prior to European settlement, there is evidence of different aboriginal occupations in the area. None was contemporaneous with the Norse occupation. The most prominent of these earlier occupations were by the Dorset people, who predated the Norse by about 200 years.

=== 3,900 to 3,000 BP ===
- 3,000 BP Human sites have been found on the Slate Islands (Ontario), Slate Island, in what is now known as northern Lake Superior, dating to about 3000 BP.
  - Pukaskwa Pits are depressions left by early inhabitants, probably Algonkian people, between 3000 BP and 500 BP. The larger pits or "lodges" may have been seasonal dwellings with domed coverings, hunting blinds or caches for food. The smaller pits may have been used to cook food or smoke fish. Ojibwe, voyageurs, fur traders, prospectors, fishermen and loggers came later.

=== 2,900 to 2,000 BP ===
- 2,400 years ago Tom Andrews, working closely with the Sahtúot'ine or Mountain Dene and using their experience and tradition knowledge (TEK), found 2400-year-old spear throwing tools in the Mackenzie Mountains. The spear and "1000-year-old ground squirrel snare, and bows and arrows dating back 850 years" were used by the Mountain Dene's ancestors.
- 2,300 to 1000 BP There is archaeological evidence that corn—and therefore agricultural—was introduced as early as 2,300 BP "across northeastern North America", by Northeast Woodlands Indigenous groups

=== 1,900 to 1,000 BP ===
- 1,050 BP Huron-Petun, or Wendat-Tionontaté, Iroquoian-speaking agriculturalists occupied south-central Ontario from 1050 BP to 300 BP.

== 1st millennium AD ==
- 800 AD Ancestors of the Kʼómoks used fish traps to fish for herring and salmon in the Comox Estuary and the Puntledge River. Archaeologists found hundreds of large fish traps underwater made with 150,000 to 200,000 Douglas Fir stakes that were carbon dated from 1,300 to over 100 years old.

== 1000 to 1500 AD ==
- c. 1000 – c. 1500 Norse settlement. Greenland Norse trade.
- c. 1000 – c. 1500 Two large 15th-century Huron ancestral villages surrounded by palisade, Draper Site and the Mantle Site have been excavated. The Mantle Site had more than 70 longhouses. They later moved from there to their Georgian Bay historic territory to their villages such as, Ratcliff Site, the Aurora or Old Fort Site where they encountered Champlain in 1615.
- 1400s William W. Warren wrote c. 1842 that the Ojibwe people had been on Madeline Island since c. 1490—for 8 generations—and left in the 19th century. The dates have been disputed. (Note: According to Busch (2008), William W. Warren "described a copper plate kept by an Ojibwe chief that as of 1842 recorded eight generations since the chief's family had arrived on Madeline Island." "By estimating forty years as the duration of a generation, Warren calculated that the Ojibwe arrived on Madeline Island 360 years earlier or ca. 1490. (Warren wrote his history between 1849 and 1852.) Warren went on to describe the great village on Madeline Island that the Ojibwe occupied for three generations, or 120 years by Warren's calculation. At the end of this time the Ojibwe abandoned Madeline Island.") A 2.6-meter long wiigwaasabak, now in the Glenbow Museum in Calgary, Alberta, by Eshkwaykeeshik James Red Sky, (b. Shoal Lake area in Manitoba c. 1899 ) author of Great leader of the Ojibway: Mis-quona-queb, recounts the Ojibwe peoples' 500-year-long journey in the 14th and 15th centuries migrating from the Zhiiwitaagani-gichigami (Atlantic Ocean) down the St. Lawrence River to Montreal, past the Lachine Rapids to Mattawa, Ontario, down the French River (Ontario) to Lake Huron, Nayaano-nibiimaang Gichigamiin (Great Lakes). They continued through the Straits of Mackinac to Sault Ste. Marie, Ontario, along the south shore of Lake Superior to the Keweenaw Peninsula, then to La Pointe, Wisconsin, breaking through a sand bar at Fond du Lac, Wisconsin, at the west end of Lake Superior and traveled up the St. Louis River westward to Leech Lake and finally to (Madeline Island) in Lake Superior. James Redsky Redsky learned about the cultural practices of the Ojibway, including the Medewiwin tradition, from his uncle Baldhead Redsky and "became the custodian of eight ancient and sacred birchbark scrolls containing historical information".
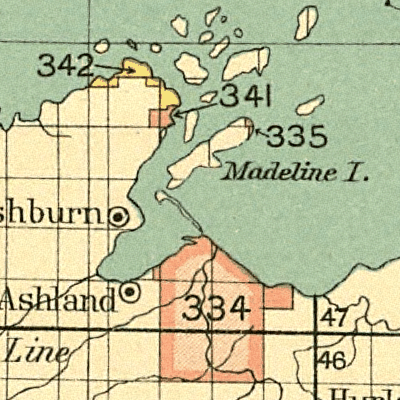
  An early map of Madeline Island, Chequamegon Bay, Lake Superior
- 1500–1550 The Seed-Barker archaeological site is a 16th-century Iroquoian village on the Humber River in Vaughan. It has been used as a summer school field trip site since 1976 by the Boyd archaeological field summer school for high school students. The school is sponsored by the York Region district school board in co-operation with the Royal Ontario Museum and the Toronto and Region Conservation Authority (TRCA). In 1895 a local farmer began finding Iroquoian artifacts in the area. In 1895 Roland Orr recognized the classic ecological features favoured by the Iroquoian people for their villages: floodplains along a river, an easily defensible plateau and nearby forests. The Peeps used the floodplains to plant the three main agricultural crops: squash, maize (corn), and climbing beans, using a companion planting technique known as the Three Sisters. In the 1950s University of Toronto professor, Norman Emerson, and the students excavated artifacts from the Seed-Baker site. Since 1975 more than a million artifacts were discovered and nineteen longhouses were excavated.
  Seed-Barker site 16th century Iroquoian village, Vaughan, ON

== Early colonies (1500–1763) ==
- c. 1536–1632 Documented accounts of Basques whalers in the Strait of Belle Isle Terranova – the "first Europeans to regularly visit North America" focused on the harbor of Red Bay in the 16th century. In the 16th century there was extensive trade contact overall friendly exchanges between the Basque whalers and the Mi'kmaq which provided the basis for the development of an Algonquian–Basque pidgin in the mid-16th century, with a strong Mi'kmaq imprint, recorded still in use in the early 18th century. Linguist P. Bakker identified two Basque loanwords in Mi'kmaq.
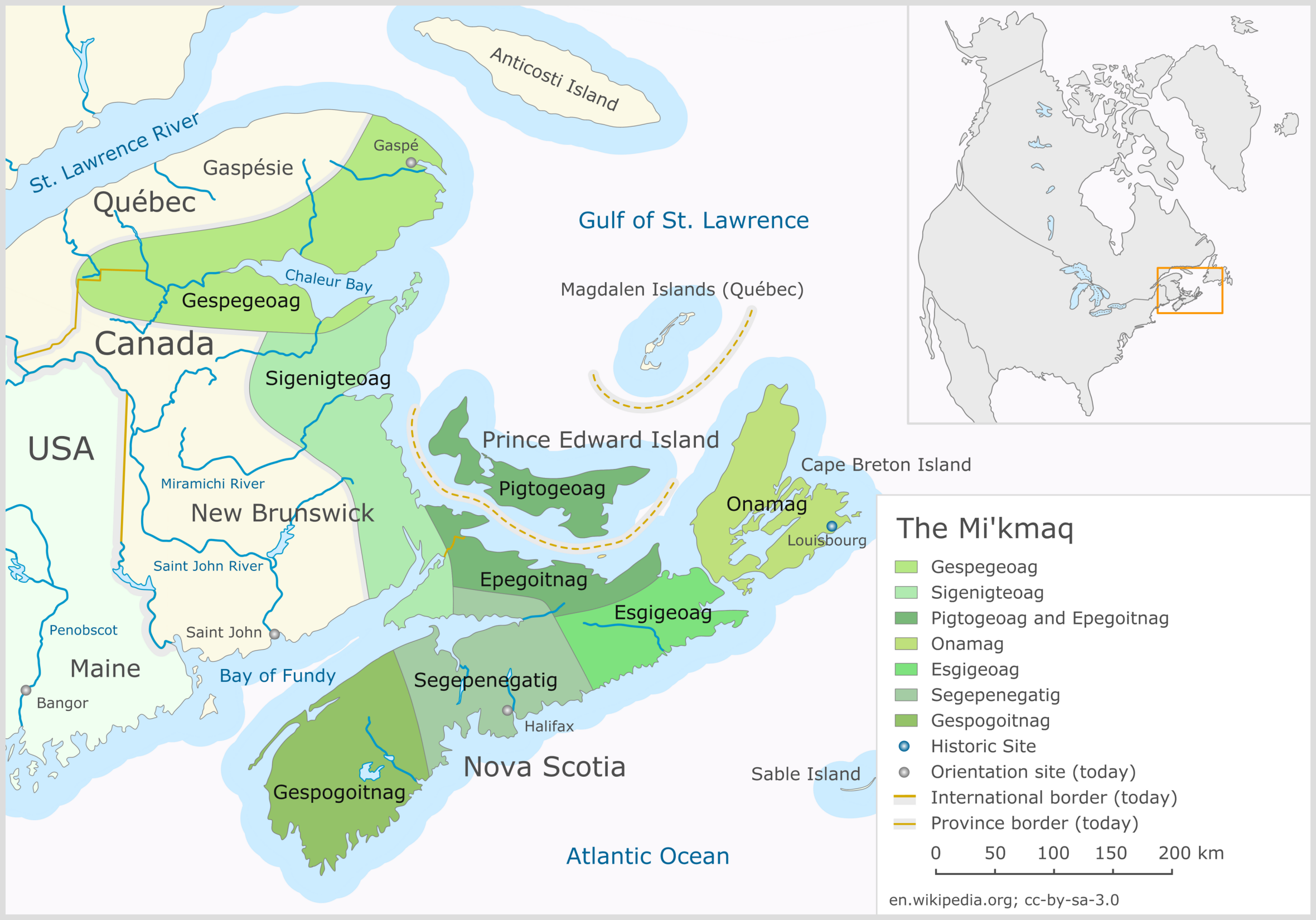
  _{Mi'kma'ki: Divided into seven districts: Epekwitk aq Piktuk (Epegwitg aq Pigtug) Eskikewa'kik (Esge'gewa'gi) Kespek (Gespe'gewa'gi) Kespukwitk (Gespugwitg) Siknikt (Signigtewa'gi) Sipekni'katik (Sugapune'gati) Unama'kik (Unama'gi)}
  - c. 1580A notable" quantity of European goods had reached the eastern Iroquoians of the St. Lawrence Valley. At the same time, Wendat, Mohawks and other groups had driven the St. Lawrence Iroquoians from their villages with those who remained "absorbed by the Huron -Petuns, the eastern Iroquois, the Abenakis, and possibly the Ottawa River Algonquians."
  - 1603 Samuel de Champlain first encountered the Mi'kmaq – whom he referred to the Souriquois after the Shediac River (Jedaick in the original Mi'kmaq which Champlain referred to as the Souricoua River) – on his first expedition to North America in 1603. He visited the traditional lands of the Mi'kmaq people in the Shediac area in southeast New Brunswick including Percé, Quebec Sigsôg ("steep rocks" or "crags") and Pelseg ("fishing place") which he named Isle Percée ("Pierced Island"). The Mi'kmaq had a large encampment – Gédaique – meaning "running far in." The Mi'kmaq used the copper from a mine in the area which is found in burial sites. Champlain observed that the winter encampment of the Mi'kmaq was on Cape Breton Island. According to archaeological finds – including stone and copper tools – the Shediac watershed "appears to have been a transportation nexus" for "thousands of generations." The material culture of the "first ten thousand years" include "tools, adornments and weapons" made out of stone and copper by pre-contact people.
    Port Royal
  - 1606–1607 Marc Lescarbot – lawyer, traveler, and writer – stayed in Port-Royal from July 1606 until the spring of 1607. From there he went to the Saint John River and Île Sainte-Croix. He wrote about the first European encounters with the Mi'kmaq and the Malécite in his book Histoire de la Nouvelle-France published in 1609. Lescarbot made notes on native songs and languages. "Lescarbot described hill planting and intercropping of corn and beans among the aboriginal peoples of Maine, Virginia and Florida."
  - 1608-1760 "This alliance between French and First Nations forcing each into the others arms, created our first example of intercultural learning in Canadian history. Indians had helped scurvy-ridden men cure themselves with white cedar. Natives taught the French how to survive the winter. They supplied them with valuable geographical information. The French learned the value of birch bark canoes, toboggans, and snowshoes. They learned how to make maple sugar and collect berries."
  - 1610 Henri Membertou also known as Kjisaqmaw Maupeltuk, chief of the Mi'Kmaq, sakmow (Grand Chief) of the Mi'kmaq First Nations – entered into a relationship with the Catholic Church – the Mi'kmaq Concordat. A lay priest - Jessé Fléché - baptized Sakmowk Membertou and twenty-one of his immediate family members was baptized by a lay priest Jessé Fléché on 24 June 1610. Sakmowk Membertou encouraged all of his people to convert.
  - 1611 Henri Membertou was the Grand Chief of the Grand Council made up of chiefs Keptinaq from the seven district councils in Mi'kma'ki, Elders, the Putús, the women's council, and the Grand Chief. He was at least one hundred years old when he died on 18 September 1611. He was originally chief of the Kespukwitk district where the French first overwintered in Port Royal.
  - 1629 The Hausenosaunee Beaver Wars (1629–1701) helped establish New France and French imperialism in North America, according to historians William Starna and José António Brandão. They said that rivalries that already existed between Indigenous peoples of the Great Lakes region were further exacerbated by European trade goods and the beaver trade. The Haudenosaunee were supported by England and Dutch Republic. Algonquian allies included the Wendat (Huron), Erie, Neutral, Odawa, Ojibwe, Mississaugas, Potawatomi, Algonquin, Shawnee, Wenro, Mahican, Innu, Abenaki, Miami, Illinois Confederation, and other nations allied with France.
  - 1669 Pierre-Esprit Radisson in the English service, sailed along the coast from the Rupert River to the Nelson River both in Hudson Bay.
  - 1670 In his 2002 publication, historical geographer Paul Hackett traced how epidemics of highly infectious diseases, such as smallpox, influenza, and measles—carried unwittingly by European traders—through the region known as the Petit Nord. This region which is east of the prairies and was covered in a boreal forest, extends from Lake Winnipeg in the west to the Great Lakes in the east and the Hudson Bay lowlands to the north. The epidemics spread through the Petit Nord to busy trading centres in Sault Ste. Marie and the Red River Settlement from 1670 through 1846.
  - 1670–71 Pierre-Esprit Radisson explored the James Bay area in the winter of 1670/71 from the base at Rupert House.
  - 1673 Charles Bayly of the Hudson's Bay Company established a fur-trading post originally called Moose Fort at what is now Moose Factory.
  - 1755 In 1755 the first Indian Department led by pre-Confederation superintendents, was established as a wing of the British military in British North America. Sir William Johnson, who served from 1755 to 1774 was Sir William Johnson, who was responsible for seeking allegiance to Britain against France and the United States, from First Nations who lived north of the Ohio River. His son John Johnson became superintendent in 1796.
  - 1763Royal Proclamation of 1763

== Displacement and assimilation (1764–1969) ==
- 1793 Nuxálk and Carrier guides led Alexander MacKenzie along the grease trails to the Pacific Ocean when natural obstacles in the Fraser River prevented his continued water route. Nuxalk-Carrier Route or Blackwater Trail was part of a long used network of trails originally used by the Nuxálk and Carrier people for communication, transport and trade, in particular, trade in Eulachon grease from the Pacific coast.
- 1799 Makenunatane "Swan Chief", was a visionary leader, who foresaw the changes coming that would affect his people, the Dunne-za or Beaver Nation. He believed his people should adopt the more individualistic life of the fur trapper-trader rather than continue with the communal hunts to survive. He led his people to a trading post to initiate contact with the traders. He also encouraged them to accept Christianity as he believed the Christian rituals were more appropriate to the life of fur traders and Christianity was a short cut to heaven. Swan Chief got his name because of his ability to fly like the swan. He had powerful visions of the bison hunt and organized the surround and slaughter hunts with skill because of his visions.
- 1812 "British support for First Nations was a source of conflict that was the foundation for the Revolutionary War and continued with the War of 1812. "During the War of 1812, an alliance was established and a respectful relationship grew between a British leader, Major General Isaac Brock, a British Officer, and an emerging Shawnee leader of the First Nations named Tecumseh." After the war the traditional roles for Indian people in colonial society declined rapidly.
- 1821 A trading post was established at York Factory as headquarters of the Hudson's Bay Company's Northern Department. They traded with the Swampy Cree (Maškēkowak / nēhinawak).
- 1839 Upper Canada passed a law to protect Indian reserves, basically including Indian lands in with crown lands.
- 1840sThe first Indian residential schools in Canada were set up in the 1840s with the last residential school closing in 1996.
- 1850 Four works by George Copway Kah-Ge-Ga-Gah-Bowh (1818–1869), a Mississaugas Ojibwa writer, ethnographer, and Methodist missionary, lecturer, were published in 1850, The Traditional History and Characteristic Sketches of the Ojibway Nation, The Life, Letters, and Speeches of Kah-ge-ga-gah-Bowh, Ojibwa Conquest, and Organization of a New Indian Territory, East of the Missouri River
- 1867 The British North America Act 1867 Constitution Act, 1867 established Canada as a self-governing country.
- 1867 Thirteen cabinets were established through negotiations after the creation Dominion of Canada including the "minister of the interior, who was also then the superintendent-general of Indian affairs".
- 1868 The British Parliament passed the Rupert's Land Act 1868 – "An Act for enabling Her Majesty to accept a Surrender upon Terms of the Lands, Privileges and Rights of 'The Governor and Company of Adventurers of England trading into Hudson's Bay' and for admitting the same into the Dominion of Canada."
- 1869–70 On 19 November 1869, HBC surrendered its charter to the British Crown, which was authorized to accept the surrender by the Rupert's Land Act.

The new Canadian government compensated the Hudson's Bay Company £300,000 ($1.5 million)(£27 million in 2010) for dissolving it HBC's charter with the British Crown. The HBC had exclusive commercial domain over Rupert's Land—a vast continental expanse—a third of what is now Canada. By order-in-council dated 23 June 1870, the British government admitted Rupert's Land to Canada through the Constitution Act, 1867, effective 15 July 1870, conditional on the making of treaties with the sovereign indigenous nations providing consent to the Queen.

- 1871 Treaty 1, a controversial agreement established 3 August 1871 between Queen Victoria and Brokenhead Ojibway Nation, Fort Alexander (Sagkeeng First Nation), Long Plain First Nation, Peguis First Nation, Roseau River Anishinabe First Nation, Sandy Bay First Nation and Swan Lake First Nation in South Eastern Manitoba including the Chippewa and Swampy Cree tribes, was the first of the numbered Treaties.
- 1871 "Your Great Mother, therefore, will lay aside for you 'lots' of land to be used by you and your children forever. She will not allow the white man to intrude upon these lots. She will make rules to keep them for you, so that as long as the sun shall shine, there shall be no Indian who has not a place that he can call his home, where he can go and pitch his camp or if he chooses build his house and till his land."
- 1872 Then Prime Minister John A. Macdonald established the Department of the Interior for the purpose of administering the Dominion Lands Act of 1872.
- 1873 1 June A group of American bison hunters, wolf hunters or "wolfers", and whisky traders killed a camp of over twenty Nakoda Assiniboine people. The Massacre was a catalyst to bring the newly formed North-West Mounted Police to the area. In 1964 the site of the massacre was designated a National Historic Site of Canada.
  Cypress Hills Massacre
- 1875 In the summer of 1875 government offered the Fisher River Cree Nation some land at the mouth of the Fisher River because their preferred land at Grassy Narrows/White Mud River that Chief Rundle had requested in 1874, was reserved for Icelandic immigrants. The land granted to New Iceland was a 57.9 kilometres (36.0 mi) strip of land that stretched along the western shore of Lake Winnipeg between Boundary Creek and White Mud River inclusive of Hecla Island including what is now Gimli.
- 1876 A severe smallpox epidemic erupted in 1876 originating from the second wave of hundreds of Icelandic settlers resulting in hundreds of deaths as it quickly spread to the indigenous First Nation population including the nearby Sandy Bar Band first nation community at Riverton. The newly formed Council of Keewatin imposed severe restrictions on the fur trade with furs and trading posts burnt to prevent the spread of smallpox and no possibility of compensation. The epidemic and quarantine postponed the move until the summer of 1877 when 43 families—representing 200 people made the 200 mile journey south to the present day Fisher River Reserve.
- 1876 The Indian Act, a Canadian statute that concerns registered Indians, their bands, and the system of Indian reserves was first passed in 1876 and is still in force with amendments, it is the primary document which governs how the Canadian state interacts with the 614 Indian bands in Canada and their members. Throughout its long history the act has been an ongoing source of controversy and has been interpreted in many ways by both Aboriginal and non-Aboriginal Canadians. The legislation has been amended many times, including "over twenty major changes" made by 2002. The provisions of Section 91(24) of the Constitution Act, 1867, provided Canada's federal government exclusive authority to legislate in relation to "Indians and Lands Reserved for Indians".
- 1876 25 November |The District of Keewatin was created by the passage of the Keewatin Act on 7 October 1876 The government of Canada established the Council of Keewatin with Lieutenant Governor Alexander Morris as its head. The Council was disbanded on 16 April 1877.
- 1877Following the signing of Treaty 5 the Fisher River Cree Nation a "surplus population" of 180 people who had been living at Norway House 200 miles south to Fisher River in 1877 and 1888. The HBC earned $1000 in revenue by assisting with the move.
- 1879 This year is remembered by the Blackfoot Confederacy or Niitsitapi as Itsistsitsis/awenimiopi meaning when first/no more buffalo.
- 1879 John A. Macdonald implemented the National Policy with its focus on the speedy construction of the Canadian Pacific Railway (CPR). In his 2013 history, James Daschuk described how the government used starvation to move the First Nations unto reserves. The National Post reported that Daschuk had found ample primary evidence in government archives that "Macdonald's Indian agents explicitly withheld food in order to drive bands onto reserve and out of the way of the railroad." A Liberal MP at the time even called it "a policy of submission shaped by a policy of starvation."
- 1883 Sir Hector-Louis Langevin PC KCMG CB QC (25 August 1826 – 11 June 1906), a Canadian lawyer, politician and one of the Fathers of Confederation played an important role in the establishment of the Canadian Indian residential school system. As Secretary of State for the Provinces, Langevin made it clear to Parliament in 1883 that day schools would be insufficient in assimilating Aboriginal children. Langevin was one of the architects of the residential schools and argued: "The fact is that if you wish to educate the children you must separate them from their parents during the time they are being taught. If you leave them in the family they may know how to read and write, but they will remain savages, whereas by separating them in the way proposed, they acquire the habits and tastes...of civilized people."
- 1885 The pass system was introduced by the Department of Indian Affairs and was phased out by the 1940s. While it was never a law, Indian agents assumed authority to grant or deny permission for aboriginal people to leave or for outsiders to enter, reserves.
- 1884 The Great Marpole Midden, an ancient Musqueam village and burial site in the Marpole neighbourhood of Vancouver, British Columbia, was uncovered during road upgrading.
- 1887 In 1887, the Nisga'a challenged the distribution of their traditional lands in the Nass River valley to western settlers. This was in violation of the Royal Proclamation of 1763, which recognized Aboriginal title in British North America and acknowledged the existence and continuity of Aboriginal self-government.
- 1888 St. Catherines Milling v. The Queen, regarding lands on Lake Wabigoon granted to a lumber company by the federal government, thought to be within Rupert's Land when Canada entered into Treaty 3 in 1873 with the Ojibway. It was the leading case on aboriginal title in Canada for more than 80 years. See R. v. Guerin.
- 1899 Treaty 8 was the last formal treaty signed by a First Nation in British Columbia until Nisga agreement.
- 1890-1891 Two monuments dedicated to Canada's Aboriginal Peoples and their cultures were unveiled in front of Quebec's Parliament Building: Louis-Philippe Hébert's A Halt in the Forest (1890) and The Nigog Fisherman (1891). This countercurrent respect of Aboriginal Peoples' contribution to Canada's history shows the insight of the avant-garde of Eugène-Étienne Taché, the Parliament building' architect, who commissioned the sculptures. They were the first monuments unveiled in front of the building.
- 1900 The Beaver peoples suffering from disease and starvation, were the last band to sign Treaty 8 in May, 1900.
- 1907 In Moose Factory, Bishop Horden Memorial School also known as Horden Hall Residential School, Moose Factory Residential School, Moose Fort Indian Residential School (1907–1963), named after Bishop Horden, serving all the communities in the James Bay area, was run by the Anglican Church. The Truth and Reconciliation Commission investigated the school which, like others across Canada, where the highest number of premature deaths among children at these schools was from tuberculosis.
- 1922 Peter Henderson Bryce self-published The Story of a National Crime: an Appeal for Justice in which he expressed grave concerns about the Indian residential schools in Canada. His original 1907 report was a scathing indictment of the condition of the church-run schools. He noted the number of children who had died at the schools from tuberculosis. He argued that the over-crowded and over-heated facilities combined with lack of nutrition and hygiene created an environment where children became deathly ill. When Duncan Campbell Scott ignored his report and then fired him, he published this document.
- 1930 By 1930 the caribou in the Newfoundland interior — upon which the Mi'kmaq depended — had been hunted to near extinction. With the completion of the railway across Newfoundland in 1898 large numbers of sports hunters and settlers had easy access to the huge interior boreal woodland caribou herds. This led to an appalling slaughter with the caribou populations dropping from "about 200,000–300,000 in 1900 to near extinction by 1930."
- 1933 The Great Marpole Midden, an ancient Musqueam village and burial site located was designated as a National Historic Site of Canada.
- 1936 The Department of the Interior was dissolved in 1936 through the Natural Resources Acts which transferred control over natural resources to the Prairie provinces). Indian Affairs fell under the purview of the Department of Mines and Resources.
- 1940s The First Nations nutrition experiments were conducted on isolated communities, such as The Pas and Norway House in northern Manitoba and in residential schools.
- 1953 The Department of the Interior was renamed the Department of Northern Affairs and National Resources.
- 1950s, 1960s UBC professor Charles Edward Borden undertook salvage archaeology projects at Great Marpole Midden. Borden "was the first to draw links between contemporary Musqueam peoples and excavated remains."
- 1961 In the early 1960s, the National Indian Council was created in 1961 to represent indigenous people of Canada, including treaty/status Indians, non-status Indians, the Métis people, though not the Inuit.
- 1960s The Sixties Scoop was coined by Patrick Johnston in his 1983 report Native Children and the Child Welfare System. It refers to the Canadian practice, beginning in the 1960s and continuing until the late 1980s, of apprehending unusually high numbers of children of Aboriginal peoples in Canada and fostering or adopting them out, usually into white families.
- 1961 The Department of Northern Affairs and National Resources was renamed The Department of Indian Affairs and Northern Development.
- 1960s Norval Morrisseau, an Ojibwe artist from Northern Ontario, Canada. was the originator of the Woodlands School style of painting inspired by traditional oral Ojibwe histories, dreams and visions. Morriseau learned from his grandfather Moses "Potan" Nanakonagos. Morrisseau said, "all my painting and drawing is really a continuation of the shaman's scrolls."
- 1965 The Supreme Court upheld the treaty hunting rights of Indian people on Vancouver Island against provincial hunting regulations in R. v. White and Bob.
- 1967 In 1963, the federal government commissioned University of British Columbia anthropologist Harry B. Hawthorn to investigate the social conditions of Aboriginal peoples across Canada. The Hawthorn Reports of 1966 and 1967 "concluded that Aboriginal peoples were Canada's most disadvantaged and marginalized population. They were "citizens minus." Hawthorn attributed this situation to years of failed government policy, particularly the residential school system, which left students unprepared for participation in the contemporary economy." "The Hawthorne report, issued in 1967 under the title A Survey of the Contemporary Indians of Canada, provided the first systematic non-Aboriginal critique of the Indian Act."
- 1969 Frank Arthur Calder and the Nisga'a Nation Tribal Council brought an action against the British Columbia government claimed they had legal title to their traditional territory. AANDC They declared that aboriginal title to certain lands in the province had never been lawfully extinguished.

== Renewal to constitutional entrenchment (1969–present) ==
- 1969 1969 White Paper was a Canadian policy paper by Prime Minister Pierre Trudeau and his Minister of Indian Affairs, Jean Chrétien in 1969 proposing the abolition the Indian Act and dismantling of the established legal relationship between Aboriginal peoples and the state of Canada in favour of equality. The federal government proposed that, by eliminating "Indian" as a distinct legal status, equality among all Canadians would result. The White Paper proposed to
  eliminate Indian status, dissolve the Department of Indian Affairs within five years, abolish the Indian Act, convert reserve land to private property that can be sold by the band or its members, transfer responsibility for Indian affairs from the federal government to the province and integrate these services into those provided to other Canadian citizens, provide funding for economic development and appoint a commissioner to address outstanding land claims and gradually terminate existing treaties
  — First Nations Studies Program 2009
  The federal government at the time argued that the Indian Act was discriminatory and that the special legal relationship between Aboriginal peoples and the Canadian state should be dismantled in favour of equality, in accordance with Trudeau's vision of a "just society." The federal government proposed that by eliminating "Indian" as a distinct legal status, the resulting equality among all Canadians would help resolve the problems faced by Aboriginal peoples. "Following considerable review, and rejecting the recommendations of the much touted Hawthorne Report,11 commissioned to identify the underlying causes of Aboriginal disengagement from Canadian society, of only a few years earlier, the Government of Canada released the White Paper on Indian Affairs in 1969."
- 1971 October The Manitoba Indian Brotherhood – now the Assembly of Manitoba Chiefs – presented their landmark position paper entitled, "Wahbung: Our Tomorrows"—in opposition to then-Prime Minister Pierre Elliott Trudeau's 1969 White Paper which proposed the abolition of the Indian Act. After opposition from many Aboriginal leaders—including the MIB—the white paper was abandoned in 1970.
- 1973 The Supreme Court of Canada in Calder v. British Columbia (Attorney General) 4 W.W.R. 1 was the first time that Canadian law acknowledged that aboriginal title to land existed prior to the colonization of the continent and was not merely derived from statutory law. Frank Arthur Calder and the Nisga'a Nation Tribal Council won the landmark case, Calder v British Columbia (AG) with Thomas Berger as their counsel.
- 1973 The Federation of Newfoundland Indians — which included Mi'kmaq from all across the island formed in order to achieve federal recognition.
- 1975 The James Bay and Northern Quebec Agreement land claim settlement was approved in 1975 by the Cree and Inuit of northern Quebec. It was slightly modified in 1978 by the Northeastern Quebec Agreement when the Quebec's Naskapi First Nations joined the treaty.
- 1979 In the 1979 Hamlet of Baker Lake v. Minister of Indian Affairs case, Judge Mahoney of the Federal Court of Canada, recognized the existence of Aboriginal Title in Nunavut. The plaintiffs, the Baker Lake Hunters and Trappers Association from Baker Lake and the Inuit Tapirisat of Canada (ITK) were concerned that "government-licensed exploration companies were interfering with their aboriginal rights, specifically, their right to hunt caribou."
- 1982 Section Thirty-five of the Constitution Act, 1982 provides constitutional protection to the aboriginal and treaty rights of Aboriginal peoples in Canada.
- 1984 R. v. Guerin 2 S.C.R. 335 was a landmark Supreme Court of Canada decision on aboriginal rights where the Court first stated that the government has a fiduciary duty towards the First Nations of Canada and established aboriginal title to be a sui generis right. The Musqueam Indian band won their case.
- 1985 Bill C-31.
- 1986 The National Gallery of Canada acquired its first work of contemporary art by a Canadian Indigenous artist. It was The North American Iceberg (1985) by Ojibwe artist, Carl Beam R.C.A. (1943–2005) who was originally from the M'Chigeeng First Nation.
- 1987 Meech Lake Accord, a constitutional amendment package negotiated to gain Quebec's acceptance of the Constitution Act, 1982, was negotiated without the input of Canada's Aboriginal peoples.
- 1987 November Two men stood trial in November 1987 for the 1971 murder of Helen Betty Osborne—a nineteen-year old Cree teenager who was attending Margaret Barbour Collegiate in The Pas, Manitoba, at the time. "Allegations were made that the identity of four people present at the killing was known widely in the community shortly after the murder." This was one of the incidents that became the catalyst for the establishment of the Manitoba Aboriginal Justice Inquiry in April 1988.
- 1988 March John Joseph Harper, executive director of the Island Lake Tribal Council, died "following an encounter with a Winnipeg police officer. Many people, particularly in the Aboriginal community, believed many questions about the incident were left unanswered by the police service's internal investigation." This was one of the incidents that became the catalyst for the establishment of the Manitoba Aboriginal Justice Inquiry in April 1988.
- 1988 April The Manitoba Government created the Aboriginal Justice Inquiry in response to "the trial in November 1987 of two men for the 1971 murder of Helen Betty Osborne in The Pas and the death in March 1988 of J.J. Harper, executive director of the Island Lake Tribal Council.
- 1989 Rita Joe PC CM (born in Whycocomagh, Nova Scotia 1932 – died Sydney, Nova Scotia 2007) was a Mi'kmaw poet and songwriter, known as the Poet Laureate of the Mi'kmaq people. She wrrote in both Mi'kmaq and English about loss and resilience of the Mi'kmaq culture, was awarded the Order of Canada in 1989. Well known works include the 1996 publication Song of Rita Joe: Autobiography of a Mi'kmaq Poet which told of some of her experiences at the Shubenacadie Indian Residential School. She is one of a number of writers who refers in her work to Glooscap, a trickster, a cultural hero in Mi'kmaq literature. Other honours include the National Aboriginal Achievement Award in 1987 and the Queen's Privy Council for Canada in 1992.
- 1990 The Oka Crisis was a land dispute between a group of Oka and the Mohawk community of Kanesatake, Quebec, the first well-publicized violent conflict between First Nations and the Canadian government in the late 20th century.
- 1990 June In 1990, Elijah Harper, OM (1949–2013) a Canadian politician and Chief of his Red Sucker Lake, Manitoba, held an eagle feather as he refused to accept the Meech Lake Accord because it did not address any First Nations grievances. Harper was the first "Treaty Indian" in Manitoba to be elected as a member of the Legislative Assembly of Manitoba.
- 1990 The third, final constitutional conference on Aboriginal peoples was also unsuccessful. The Manitoba assembly was required to unanimously consent to a motion allowing it to hold a vote on the accord, because of a procedural rule. Twelve days before the ratification deadline for the Accord, Harper began a filibuster that prevented the assembly from ratifying the accord. Because Meech Lake failed in Manitoba, the proposed constitutional amendment failed.
- 1991 The Royal Commission on Aboriginal Peoples was a Canadian Royal Commission established in 1991 to address many issues of aboriginal status that had come to light with recent events such as the Oka Crisis and the Meech Lake Accord
- 1993 18 June The report "Aboriginal Peoples and the Justice System" by the National Round Table on Aboriginal Justice Issues was published. It included a chapter by Patricia A. Monture (1958–2010), a Mohawk lawyer, educator and writer.
- 1995 6 September On 6 September 1995 Dudley George was fatally shot by an Ontario Provincial Police (OPP) officer in Ipperwash Provincial Park leading to the Ipperwash Inquiry.
- 1996 For almost two decades—from 1996 to 2015—an arbitrary cap on the base budget of the Indian and Northern Affairs Canada (INAC), the federal department that funds and regulates water and sanitation infrastructure on reserves, limiting INAC to a 2% annual increase "regardless of population growth, inflation, or need." The funding constraints were first imposed under Prime Minister Jean Chrétien (1993–2003), and maintained during the premiership of Stephen Harper (2006–2015). These funding caps were criticized by the United Nations special rapporteur on the rights to water and sanitation, who "warned that imposing this type of cap can slow down the progressive realization of human rights, or worse, lead to retrogression".
  - Steven Tyler Kummerfield and Alexander Dennis Ternowetsky were charged with manslaughter in the death of 28-year-old Pamela Jean George of the Sakimay First Nation near Regina on 18 April 1995. Justice Ted Malone interrupted the Crown prosecutor several times and gave "controversial instructions" to the jury all-white jury to "bear in mind that Pamela "indeed was a prostitute". Justice Malone told the jury that it would be "very dangerous' to convict Kummerfield and Ternowetsky of first degree murder." In response, "a coalition of Regina-based women's groups filed a formal complaint against Mr. Justice Malone to the Canadian Judicial Council for the inappropriate comments during his charge to the jury. The National Action Committee on the Status of Women said the judge's remarks "dehumanized women and trivialized the murder". Blaine Favel, Chief of the Federation of Saskatchewan Indian Nations, called the verdict "one of the most unjust in Saskatchewan judicial history".
  - The report of the Royal Commission on Aboriginal Peoples was published setting out "a 20-year agenda for implementing changes."
  - The 'Nisga'a Final Agreement or Nisga'a Treaty was signed by Joseph Gosnell, Nelson Leeson and Edmond Wright of the Nisg_a'a Nation. Nisga'a Treaty the long-standing and historic land claims made by the Nisg_a'a with the government of British Columbia, and the Government of Canada. As part of the settlement in the Nass River valley nearly 2,000 square kilometres of land was officially recognized as Nisg_a'a, and a 300,000 cubic decameter water reservation was also created. Bear Glacier Provincial Park was also created as a result of this agreement. Thirty-one Nisga'a placenames in the territory became official names. The land-claim settlement was the first formal treaty signed by a First Nation in British Columbia since Treaty 8 in 1899. The agreement gives the Nisga'a control over their land, including the forestry and fishing resources contained in it.
- 1997 Delgamuukw v. British Columbia 3 S.C.R. 1010, is a decision of the Supreme Court of Canada that set a "precedent for how treaty rights are understood in Canadian courts, affirming the recognition of oral testimony from Indigenous people." The SCC "found treaty rights could not be extinguished, confirmed oral testimony is as legitimate as other forms of evidence and stated Indigenous title rights include not only land, but the right to extract resources from the land." In 1984, the Gitksan and the Wet'suwet'en Nation had claimed ownership of land in northwestern British Columbia and took the BC government to court to "establish jurisdiction over 58,000 square kilometres of land and water in northwest British Columbia."
- 1997 "Since 1997, more than 207 archaeological objects and 1700 faunal remains have been recovered from 43 melting ice patches in the southern Yukon. The artifacts range in age from a 9000-year-old (calendar) dart shaft to a 19th-century musket ball ... Of particular interest is the description of three different techniques for the construction of throwing darts and the observation of stability in the hunting technology employed in the study area over seven millennia. Radiocarbon chronologies indicate that this period of stability was followed by an abrupt technological replacement of the throwing dart by the bow and arrow after 1200 BP." The artifacts are curated by the Yukon Archaeology Program, Government of Yukon.
- 1999 Canadian Indigenous Languages and Literacy Development Institute (CILLDI) was established in 1999.
- 2001 In the 2001 INAC publication, Words First: an Evolving Terminology Relating to Aboriginal Peoples in Canada, which described outdated terminology and suggested more respectful terms, noted that "Many First Nations now prefer the term "First Nation community," and no longer use "reserve". In Canada, the term First Nation began replacing Indian in the 1970s According to the Communications Branch of Indian and Northern Affairs Canada publication, published in 2001 and updated since, to "provide writers with background information and guidance on appropriate word usage and style issues, the term "Indian" is controversial and outdated. The Department, following "contemporary usage, typically uses the term "First Nation" instead of "Indian," except in the following cases: in direct quotations, when citing titles of books, works of art, etc., in discussions of history where necessary for clarity and accuracy, in discussions of some legal/constitutional matters requiring precision in terminology, in discussions of rights and benefits provided on the basis of "Indian" status and in statistical information collected using these categories (e.g., the Census)."
- 2002 Matthew Coon Come, national chief of the Assembly of First Nations and other chiefs across Canada rejected the First Nations Governance Act (FNGA) proposed in 2002 by then-Robert Nault, then the minister of Indian affairs, during the final term of then-Prime Minister Jean Chrétien. Coon Come said the proposed FNGA intended to reform the Indian Act, was paternalistic. Margaret Swan of Manitoba's Southern Chiefs' Organization said that one of the omissions on the part of the federal government in the process was bypassing the elected leadership of First Nations communities. When Prime Minister Paul Martin assumed office in 2003, he abandoned the legislation.
- 2005 29 December During the visit of Queen Elizabeth II to Alberta and Saskatchewan in 2005, provincial and federal ministers denied First Nation leaders private audience with the monarch – something they have had since the 1600s. Land claim disputes, as well as a perceived intervention of the Crown into aboriginal affairs threatened relationships between The Canadian Crown and Aboriginal peoples.
- 2004 Justice David R. Wright's "explosive" report of the 20-month inquiry into the death by hypothermia of Saulteaux First Nations teenager Neil Stonechild on 25 November 1990, was published in 2004. As a result of the inquiry and the Wright's report Saskatoon police began to use "GPS and video surveillance in cruisers". An "independent body" to investigate complaints was created. Lawrence Joseph, then vice-chief of the Federation of Saskatchewan Indian Nations (FCIN) said in 2015, that, "This process has torn down walls and fences. It has built bridges in our society." The Saskatoon StarPhoenix produced an in-depth 2004 series in the referred to the Stonechild Effect.
- 2005 In 2005, the federal government spent $9.1 billion for "education, social services, health and housing programs for aboriginal people, many of whom are owed the support under historic, mutually agreed upon treaties."
- 2005 24–25 November The Kelowna Accord was a series of agreements between the Government of Canada, First Ministers of the Provinces, Territorial Leaders, and the leaders of five national Aboriginal organizations regarding proposed improvements in Aboriginal education, employment, and living conditions through a five-year "$5-billion plan." The first meetings on Aboriginal Affairs were held in Kelowna, British Columbia, on 24–25 November 2005 with then-Prime Minister Paul Martin. The Kelowna Accord had proposed a five-year, "$5-billion plan to improve the lives of First Nations, Métis and Inuit peoples." Although endorsed by Martin, it was not endorsed by his successor, then-Prime Minister Stephen Harper. The Accord had included "$1.8 billion for education, to create school systems, train more aboriginal teachers and identify children with special needs; $1.6 billion for housing, including $400 million to address the need for clean water in many remote communities; $1.3 billion for health services; and $200 million for economic development." The Kelowna Accord was the result of 18 months of talks and the final plan "included a 19-page plan of targets and reporting requirements."
- 2006 2 May According to the CBC, the first budget of the newly-elected Conservative government under Prime Minister Stephen Harper, "killed" the Kelowna Accord as only $150 million was allocated to finance aboriginal education, clean water, housing, etc in 2006.
- 2006 In 2006, a court-approved Indian Residential Schools Settlement Agreement (IRSSA), the largest class action in Canada's history was reached with implementation to begin in September 2007. Crawford Class Action was the court-appointed administrator. Various measures to address the legacy of Indian Residential Schools (IRS) included a $20 million Commemoration Fund for national and community commemorative projects, $1.9 billion for the Common Experience Payment (CEP), Independent Assessment Process (IAP), $60 million for the Truth and Reconciliation Commission (TRC) to document and preserve the experiences of survivors, Healing Support such as Resolution Health Support Worker (RHSW) Program and $125 million for the Aboriginal Healing Foundation (AHF). The IRSSA offered former students blanket compensation through the Common Experience Payment (CEP) which averaged lump-sum payment of $28,000. Payments were higher for more serious cases of abuse. The CEP, a component of the Indian Residential Schools Settlement Agreement, "part of an overall holistic and comprehensive response to the Indian residential school legacy." The CEP recognized "the experience of living at an Indian Residential School(s) and its impacts. All former students who resided at a recognized Indian Residential School(s) and were alive on 30 May 2005 were eligible for the CEP. This include[d] First Nations, Métis, and Inuit former students." "To benefit former students and families: $125 million to the Aboriginal Healing Foundation for healing programmes; $60 million for truth and reconciliation to document and preserve the experiences of survivors; and $20 million for national and community commemorative projects."
- 2007 13 September The United Nations Declaration on the Rights of Indigenous Peoples (UNDRIP) was adopted by the General Assembly on Thursday, 13 September 2007, by a majority of 144 states in favour, 4 votes against (Australia, Canada, New Zealand and the United States) and 11 abstentions (Azerbaijan, Bangladesh, Bhutan, Burundi, Colombia, Georgia, Kenya, Nigeria, Russian Federation, Samoa and Ukraine).
- 2007 The Harper administration allocated only "$300 million in 2007 to improve education programs, provide clean water, upgrade mostly off-reserve housing and close the socio-economic gap between aboriginal Canadians and the rest of the population."
- 2008 May The Standing Senate Committee on Aboriginal Peoples submitted their interim report entitled "Honouring the Spirit of Modern Treaties: Closing the Loopholes: Interim Report Special Study on the implementation of comprehensive land claims agreements in Canada". The Committee called for the replacement of the Department of Indian and Northern Affairs Canada "with a direct institutional role between the federal Crown and Aboriginal peoples as partners."
  - 2 June The Truth and Reconciliation Commission was established in June 2008 as mandated in the 2006 Indian Residential Schools Settlement Agreement (IRSSA)—the largest class action settlement in Canadian history.
  - 11 June Then-Prime Minister Harper apologized to Indian residential school survivors in the House of Commons.
  - March Indigenous leaders and church officials embarked on a multi-city "Remembering the Children" tour to promote the Truth and Reconciliation Commission.
  - 28 September Brian Sinclair, a 45-year old indigenous man died of acute peritonitis, a bladder infection caused by the blocked catheter while sitting in his wheelchair in the waiting room of the Winnipeg Health Sciences Centre (HSC) Emergency Department after waiting unattended for 34 hours, according to a September 2017 report by the Brian Sinclair Working Group (BSWG). The BSWG was established to "examine the ongoing systemic anti-Indigenous racism in our contemporary health and legal systems." On 19 September 2008, Sinclair had been sent to the ER for an urgent catheter change by health workers at the community health care centre—the Health Action Centre—who had provided him with an explanatory letter. The 200-page report of inquest into his death was submitted on 12 December 2014. Esther Grant, Brian Sinclair's sister and administrator of Sinclair's estate commenced a Canadian Charter of Rights and Freedoms action against the Winnipeg Regional Health Authority. In May 2015, the Manitoba Court of Appeal, found that family members, "who claim to have suffered as a result of a breach of a privacy interest of another member" have the right, to "advance a claim in their own right." members of the Brian Sinclair Working Group said that while the inquest into the 2020 death of Joyce Echaquan led to changes, in Sinclair's case it did not. The former took an anti-racism approach; the latter "refused to even consider it".
  - 20 October Justice Justice Harry LaForme, chair of the Indian Residential Schools Truth and Reconciliation Commission resigned, claiming "the commission was on the verge of paralysis and doomed to failure". He cited an "incurable problem" with the other two commissioners — Claudette Dumont-Smith and Jane Brewin Morley — whom he said "refused to accept his authority as chairman and were disrespectful."
- 2009 The Death of Frank Paul entitled "Alone and Cold", was published. Commissioner William H. Davies QC led the inquiry into 5 or 6 December 1998 death in Downtown Eastside (DTES) Vancouver, British Columbia of Frank Joseph Paul who was born on 21 July 1951 on the Mi'kmaq Elsipogtog First Nation, /ɛlzɪˈbʊktʊk/ New Brunswick. The inquiry began on 10 August 2007. According to the report, on a cold December night Paul was arrested by the Vancouver Police, where "a sergeant at the city drunk tank refused to take him in, and Paul was dragged to a police wagon and then dumped in the alley, where he died of hypothermia".
  - 15 October The Indian Residential Schools Truth and Reconciliation Commission was relaunched by then-Governor General Michaëlle Jean with Justice Murray Sinclair, an Ojibway-Canadian judge, First Nations lawyer, was the chair.
- 2010 12 November Canada officially endorsed the United Nations Declaration on the Rights of Indigenous Peoples (UNDRIP) but maintained its position that UNDRIP was 'aspirational'.
- 2011 At the first anniversary of Canada's adoption of UNDRIP, Chief William Commanda (1908-3 August 2011), Anishinabek spiritual leader, was honoured for his work that was "key not only in the adoption of the U.N. declaration, but in all the work leading up to it throughout the last 25 years"
  - In 2011, the federal department responsible for First Nations, Inuit, and Metis affairs was renamed Aboriginal Affairs and Northern Development.
  - December Wataynikaneyap Power was established as a First Nation-led company that would "design, permit, construct, own and operate a 230 kV transmission line" which would provide "additional grid connection" to Pickle Lake. The township, which is 530 kilometres (330 mi) north of Thunder Bay, is the most northerly community in Ontario with year-round access by road via Highway 599, the only access road to the town from the south. The 3 February 2011 Ministry of Energy Directive and the Ministry's 23 November 2010 Long Term Energy Plan supported the construction of this transmission line as phase one of a two part process, to improve the connectivity of remote First Nation communities. The "second phase would extend the grid north of Pickle Lake to service the remote communities." A 6 December news release said that "significant pre-development work" was completed. The new transmission network will replace the polluting and expensive diesel generators that are used in remote Northwestern Ontario communities. Twenty First Nations communities are equal owners of Wataynikaneyap Power. Goldcorp had "provided early development funding" and had partnered with the First Nation communities from 2010 to 2015.
- 2012 30 June The Harper government shut down the 12-year old aboriginal-run National Aboriginal Health Organization (NAHO). In 2011, NAHO had received $4,955,865 from Health Canada.
- 2013 February The 158-page report by former Supreme Court Judge, Frank Iacobucci's entitled "First Nations Representation on Ontario Juries" was released in February 2013. The report was a result of a year-long investigation on the relationship between Aboriginal peoples and the Ontario justice system, According to Tanya Talaga, the report described a "justice system "in crisis" for aboriginals, particularly in Northern Ontario." Iacobucci said that the "underrepresentation of individuals living on reserves on Ontario's jury roll" was a symptom of justice system in crisis. He said that there is a broader set of "systemic issues that are at the heart of the current dysfunctional relationship between Ontario's justice system and aboriginal peoples in this province. It is these broad problems that must be tackled if we are to make any significant progress in dealing with the underrepresentation of First Nations individuals on juries." In response to Iacobucci's 2013 report, in 2015, the Attorney General of Ontario, created a new portfolio, the assistant deputy attorney general, responsible for "aboriginal issues". Lawyer Kimberly Murray, a graduate of Osgoode Law School, whose father is Mohawk and whose mother is Irish, was named as lead of the team of 17 to coordinate with Ontario's ministries and departments.
- 2014 Canadian author and journalist Writer Richard Wagamese (1955–2017), an Ojibwe from the Wabaseemoong Independent Nations, published his novel Medicine Walk, the winner of the 2015 Banff Mountain Book Festival Grand Award. In The New York Times, the novelist Liam Callanan wrote that the novel "feels less written than painstakingly etched into something more permanent than paper".
  - The 2014 decision in Tsilhqot'in Nation v British Columbia was heavily influenced by the 1997 Delgamuukw v British Columbia decision. The 2014 Tsilhqot'in decision "further established the existence of Indigenous title to land in British Columbia not covered by treaties."
- 2015 June The Indian Residential Schools Truth and Reconciliation Commission was completed in June 2015. It included 94 calls to action. This included the ratification of UNDRIP as one of its national "calls to action" in its final report.
  - 28 May Beverley McLachlin, a Supreme Court of Canada Chief Justice used the term "genocide" to describe the "mistreatment of Indigenous peoples" in her speech "Reconciling Unity and Diversity in the Modern Era: Tolerance and Intolerance". She said it was the "most glaring blemish on the Canadian historic record" and that the "assimilationist efforts constitute 'cultural genocide.'"
  - November The Trudeau government promised to lift long-term drinking water advisories (DWA) on reserves by the end of 2020. By February 2023, 138 DWAs had been lifted. Thirty two communities were still under a DWA.
- 2016 Lisa Monchalin, who graduated with a PhD in Criminology at the University of Ottawa on 3 June 2012, was the first Aboriginal woman in Canada to do so.
  - In February 2016, representatives from nine Ontario First Nations called for support at the UN Committee on Economic, Social and Cultural Rights, in Geneva, for the improvement of the water and sanitation infrastructure on reserves, citing Shoal Lake 40 First Nation as an example. The reserve has been under a drinking water advisories (DWA) since at least 2006. In Shoal Lake, raw lake water is delivered through pipes to a pump house where it is disinfected with chlorine before being pumped into homes.
  - September The Government of Canada under Prime Minister Justin Trudeau established the National Inquiry into Missing and Murdered Indigenous Women and Girls" (MMIWG) in September 2016 in response to repeated calls of indigenous groups, other activists, and NGOss to investigate missing and murdered Indigenous women. By 16 February 2018, more than "697 families and survivors" had participated in the MMIWG inquiry's "Truth Gathering Process" by sharing stories" of violence, including murder, against Indigenous women and girls with about 600 more registered to participate in community hearings. The mandate of the Commissioners of the National Inquiry Truth Gathering is to "examine and report on the systemic causes of all forms of violence against Indigenous women, girls and LGBTQ2S people in Canada by looking at patterns and underlying factors. The mandate also includes examining institutional practices and policies implemented in response to violence experienced by Indigenous women and girls, including examining police investigation practices and responses, as part of this public investigation."
  - 10 May At the United Nations Permanent Forum on Indigenous Issues in New YorkCarolyn Bennett announced that Canada intended to fully adopt and implement UNDRIP "in accordance with the Canadian Constitution." Bennett attended the conference with then-Justice Minister Jody Wilson-Raybould. Bennett said that "Through Section 35 of its Constitution, Canada has a robust framework for the protection of Indigenous rights...By adopting and implementing the declaration, we are excited that we are breathing life into Section 35 and recognizing it as a full box of rights for Indigenous Peoples in Canada."
- 2017 14 February Ontario Superior Court Justice Edward Belobaba ruled in favour of Beaverhouse First Nation Chief Marcia Brown Martel on behalf of c. 16,000 individuals affected by the Sixties Scoop—in Brown v. Canada (Attorney General). The class action lawsuit, which was first certified in 2010, was part of a series of class action lawsuits that had been launched by survivors. On 17 February 2017, then Minister of Indigenous and Northern Affairs, Carolyn Bennett, announced the launch of "negotiations towards a national resolution to Sixties Scoop litigation". A 12 November 2020 CBC article said that $875 million class action settlement agreement included $750 million to "compensate status First Nations and Inuit children and $50 million for the establishment of a foundation—the Sixties Scoop Healing Foundation, which was launched in 2020."
  - 15 June The National Gallery of Canada opened its new exhibition Canadian and Indigenous Art: From Time Immemorial to 1967 for the 150th anniversary of Confederation. NGC Director Marc Mayer, said the exhibition was "a strong affirmation of our commitment to tell these stories together, and never again apart." Greg Hill from the Grand River First Nation, who is the NGC's Audain Curator of Indigenous Art was one of a team of curators preparing the exhibitions.
  - 14 July 2017 The Working Group of Ministers on the Review of Laws and Policies Related to Indigenous Peoples, a Cabinet working group chaired by Jody Wilson-Raybould, responsible for reviewing federal laws and policies that impact the rights of Indigenous peoples. adopted 10 Principles respecting the Government of Canada's relationship with Indigenous peoples to guide their work. Those Principles released on 14 July 2017, which were the result of consultation with Indigenous groups and experts, "establish a clear, transparent foundation for reconciliation based on recognition" and "bring a new direction and standard to how government officials must work and act in partnership with Indigenous peoples to respect Indigenous rights and to implement the UN Declaration." John Borrows, the Canada Research Chair in the University of Victoria's Indigenous Law at the Faculty of Law said that these principles are "good for our economy and democracy: Indigenous economic activity generates money that is spent in our towns and cities, and Indigenous democratic participation draws more people and ideas into public life."
  - 28 August During the 29th Canadian Ministry, under then Minister Jane Philpott, the Canadian federal government created two Ministers of the Crown in the Canadian Cabinet responsible for overseeing Indigenous and Northern Affairs Canada. One of the new positions, the Indigenous Services Canada (ISC) was created on 28 August 2017 took over the management of health, clean water, and other services to reserves and other First Nations communities from the former Indigenous and Northern Affairs portfolio.
  - 16 September 2017 The Minister of Indigenous Services Jane Philpott, said that "Canada's First Nations people are 'disproportionately affected' by the opioid crisis."
  - December On 1 December 2017 the "Supreme Court of Canada (SCC) rejected the land plan proposed by the Yukon government land plan that would have opened the Peel Watershed, a pristine wilderness about the size of [the province] of Nova Scotia" to "mining and gas development". A "coalition made up of three First Nations and a conservation group gathered in Whitehorse" had argued to protect the water shed.
  - 2 February On 2 February 2018 the Supreme Court of Canada (SCC) ruled that the Williams Lake Indian Band was "wrongfully displaced from its village lands in the 1860s, and the Colony of British Columbia allowed settlers to take up their lands".
  - 9 February On 9 February 2018 in the case of the Crown vs Stanley at the Court of Queen's Bench Saskatchewan presided by Saskatchewan Chief Justice Martel D. Popescul, an all-white jury acquitted local Battleford, Saskatchewan, farmer Gerald Stanley, who had been accused of second-degree murder of 22-year-old Colten Boushie, a resident of the Cree Red Pheasant First Nation. that took place on Stanley's farm, near Biggar, Saskatchewan, on 9 August 2016. Stanley shot Boushie "in the back of the head at point blank range" as Boushie sat in the passenger seat of a Ford Escape on Stanley's property. Clint Wuttunee, Chief of the Red Pheasant First Nation, called the verdict "absolutely perverse". In the trial, Stanley's attorney Scott Spencer said there was "no evidence" that Stanley intentionally killed Boushie. Stanley's son had smashed the windshield of the SUV with a hammer. The jury accepted that the gunshot that killed Boushie was "hang fire" resulting from a "delay between the pulling of the trigger and the discharge". Following the announcement of the acquittal, about 1,000 people, including the mayor of Saskatoon, Charlie Clark, gathered at a rally at the Saskatoon court house to show support for Boushie's family and to express frustration with the acquittal. Other rallies and vigils took place in Battleford, Winnipeg, Halifax, Nova Scotia, Toronto, and Ottawa to challenge the verdict. In response to the verdict, Federation of Sovereign Indigenous Nations's Vice-chief David Pratt, challenged the jury selection system, saying that "defence counsel used peremptory challenges to block every potential juror who appeared to be Indigenous". Prime Minister Justin Trudeau issued a statement said, "I am going to say we have come to this point as a country far too many times. Indigenous people across this country are angry, they're heartbroken and I know Indigenous and non-Indigenous Canadians alike know that we have to do better." Saskatchewan Premier Scott Moe said he would be meeting with Trudeau and with First Nations leadership. At a press conference hosted by Saskatoon Tribal Council, Mayor Clark described the event as a "defining moment for this community and this country". Many chiefs across Saskatoon, including Northern communities, traveled to Saskatoon to attend the rally. In 2019, University of Toronto law professor published Canadian Justice, Indigenous Injustice: The Gerald Stanley and Colten Boushie Case.
  - 14 February Hundreds of marchers took part in the annual 14 February Women's Memorial March to commemorate missing and murdered Indigenous women. The first march was held in 1992 in response to the 1991 murder of a Coast Salish woman in Vancouver's Downtown Eastside (DTES). DTES, which is also nicknamed "Skid Row", is known for its social activism and for high levels of drug use (including an opioid epidemic (2017-ongoing) that has led to overdoses, specifically fentanyl, poverty, severe mental illness (specifically co-occurs with addiction, sex work, homelessness, and crime.
- 2018 February Prime Minister Trudeau, launched the Working Group of Ministers, with six federal ministers, including Indigenous Affairs Minister Carolyn Bennett, Fisheries Minister Dominic LeBlanc, Justice Minister Jody Wilson-Raybould, Health Minister Jane Philpott, Families Minister Jean-Yves Duclos and Natural Resources Minister Jim Carr to review "federal laws, policies and operational practices to ensure that Canada is meeting its constitutional obligations with respect to Aboriginal and treaty rights, adhering to international human rights standards, including the United Nations Declaration on the Rights of Indigenous Peoples, and supporting the implementation of the Truth and Reconciliation Commission of Canada's Calls to Action."
  - May Bill C-262, which would ensure Canada's laws were in harmony with the 2007 UNDRIP, introduced by New Democrat MP Romeo Saganash, passed in the House of Commons with a margin of 206 to 79. It was sent to the Senate.

Saganash was "among the original architects" of UNDRIP.

  - August The class action lawsuit against the Canadian government on behalf of the Sixties Scoop Survivors resulted in a $875-million settlement.
  - 30 December The Ontario Office of the Independent Police Review Director (OIPRD) released their 208-page report entitled "Broken Trust: Indigenous People and the Thunder Bay Police Service" which concluded that TBPS needed to "improve its relationship with Indigenous communities" and that it "needs to "ensure that its investigations are timely, effective and non-discriminatory."
- 2019 June According to a 2019 study by researchers at the Assembly of First Nations and the Canadian Centre for Policy Alternatives (CCPA), the third in the Upstream Institute's series on indigenous child poverty, nearly 50% of Indigenous children in Canada—both on and off reserve—were living in poverty.
  - 14 January Seamus O'Regan replaced Jane Philpott as Minister of Department of Indigenous and Northern Affairs.
  - In April 2019 chair of the UN permanent forum on Indigenous issues, Mariam Wallet Med Aboubakrine, Assembly of First Nations's Perry Bellegarde, Amnesty International Canada's Alex Neve and former president of Inuit Tapiriit Kanatami, Rosemarie Kuptana, called on the Senate to pass Bill C-262. By 1 April, Bill C-262 was in second reading at the Senate. The next stage if it passes the Senate, is the committee stage for study. According to Aboubakrine, if the Senate passes Bill C-262, "Canada would be the first country in the world to harmonize its federal laws with UNDRIP.
  - 21 June According to Minister of Indigenous Services (ISC), "Bill C-92: An Act respecting First Nations, Inuit and Métis children, youth and families received Royal Assent."
  - June The Final Report of the National Inquiry into Missing and Murdered Indigenous Women and Girls was published along with a List of Report Recommendations.
- 2020 January - March The Wetʼsuwetʼen pipeline and railways protests were partially in response to the construction of the Coastal GasLink Pipeline (CGL) through 190 kilometres (120 mi) of unceded Wetʼsuwetʼen First Nation land in British Columbia (BC).
  - 28 September Joyce Echaquan, a 37-year-old mother of seven from the community of Manawan, Quebec, of the Atikamekw Nation, recorded a Facebook Live video showing her in distress, as two nurses made "derogatory comments toward her shortly before her death" due to a pulmonary edema at the Centre hospitalier de Lanaudière in Saint-Charles-Borromée, Quebec. A "damning" 1 October 2021 report and follow-up 5 October press conference by Quebec coroner, Géhane Kamel, concluded that if Echaquan had been white, she would not have died, and that while the death was listed as "accidental", racial prejudice contributed to her "unacceptable" and preventable death. The report revealed that medical staff assumed without evidence that Echaquan was experiencing withdrawal from narcotics and was treated as such. This included being secured with restraints on all four limbs and lap belt, which could have been a factor contributing to her death. Maryse Poupart, who has been CEO of the regional health authority since March 2020, has implemented—or is in the process of implementing—the eight recommendations made by the coroner. Poupart said that the "process of improving relations with the Atikamekw people is ongoing and reconciliation takes time." The chief of the Atikamekw Council of Manawan said that he "is "very happy and particularly proud" of the steps taken by the regional health board to improve its relationship with the Atikamekw community".
  - 9 November A group of Miꞌkmaq First Nations partnering with Premium Brands Holdings Corp. announced their $1 billion purchase of Clearwater Seafoods which represented the "largest investment in the seafood industry by a Canadian Indigenous group". This means that harvest of non-Indigenous fishermen would be purchased by Clearwater Seafoods' Miꞌkmaq part owners. Just prior to the Clearwater sale, a number of non-indigenous fishers had violently protested Mi'kmaq traditional lobster fishers during the 2020 lobster fishing season.
- 2021 19 April In her 2021 Budget speech Chrystia Freeland announced over $18 billion over the next five years, for indigenous communities.
- 2021 23 May A 27 May Tk'emlúps te Secwépemc First Nation news release reported that a ground-penetrating radar specialist, who was working under the guidance of their language and cultural department and ceremonial knowledge keepers, had confirmed the remains of 215 children at a burial site at the Kamloops Indian Residential School on Tk'emlúps te Secwépemc land in British Columbia. In response, Members of Parliament unanimously fast-tracked Bill C-5, SC 2021, c 11 to establish 30 September as an annual National Day for Truth and Reconciliation. As of 2015, estimates of Canadian Indian residential school gravesites ranged from 3,200 to over 6,000.
- 2021 26 July Mary Simon, an "Inuk leader and former Canadian diplomat", became the 30th Governor General of Canada and the "first Indigenous person to hold the role." Prime Minister Trudeau had named Simon as his choice.
  - 30 September The first National Day for Truth and Reconciliation. In response to action 80 of the Truth and Reconciliation Commission of Canada—to "honour Survivors, their families, and communities, and ensure that public commemoration of the history and legacy of residential schools remains a vital component of the reconciliation process", on 3 June 2021, Bill C-5, SC 2021, c 11, amended the Canada Labour Code to include this "statutory holiday for employees of federally-regulated workplaces". 30 September is also Orange Shirt Day—a "day to reflect on and grieve Canada's tragic history of residential schools, honour the healing journey of Survivors and their communities, take collective action towards reconciliation, and engage in dialogue to ensure history will not be forgotten."
- 2022 27 July During his 24 July – 29 July 2022 penitential pilgrimage, Pope Francis apologized for the role Catholic Church played in the Canadian Indian residential school system in Maskwacis—the site of one of the largest residential schools in Canada—Ermineskin Indian Residential School
  - September: The Office of the Independent Special Interlocutor for Missing Children and Unmarked Graves and Burial Sites Associated with Indian Residential Schools tabled the report, "Moving from Our Heads to Our Hearts to Our Hands".

== See also ==
- Aboriginal peoples in Canada
- First Nations
- Index of Aboriginal Canadian-related articles
- Settlement of the Americas (Note: This well-documented article discusses conflicting theories on the prehistory of settlement.)
