= Justice for our Stolen Children Camp =

The Justice for our Stolen Children Camp in Canada was set up in Wascana Park, across from the Saskatchewan Legislature grounds on February 28, 2018. The demonstration was a response to the deaths of Colten Boushie and Tina Fontaine, and the acquittals of the accused in both cases. But the camp also wanted to illuminate systemic racism in the child welfare system and the justice and corrections systems. After 197 days, the camp was permanently dismantled on September 12, 2018.

== Prior to July 2nd meeting ==
The Saskatchewan government issued an eviction notice to the demonstrators after the security team in charge of Canada Day raised security concerns. Also cited were the violation of park bylaws. They were to leave by June 5 at 5:00 pm local time. Protesters remained on site despite the eviction, having a barbecue and performing a round dance around the teepee. The demonstration was on its 111th day when the Regina Police Service (RPS) dismantled the teepee and arrested protesters. Six protesters were taken into custody, but no charges were made and they were released shortly after.

Three days later on June 21, National Indigenous Peoples Day, the protesters returned and reassembled the teepee. The police were informed, but did not engage as there was no complaint filed. By the 26th, there were six teepees total on the Wascana Park grounds.

The Canada Day celebration events that were usually done in Wascana Park were relocated to the northern section of the park. The Provincial Capital Commission (PCC), in charge of planning the festivities, asked the RPS to remove the structures, but police Chief Evan Bray reported having no intention of removing the camp unless public safety was risked. Camp protesters responded that the PCC's request for their removal was counter to the attempts at reconciliation since the parties were meeting on July 2 to resolve the conflict.

== July 2nd meeting ==
On June 26, 2018, a meeting was scheduled between the camp and the provincial government. The meeting was on July 2, 2018, in the glass teepee in Fort Qu’Appelle at the Treaty 4 Governance Centre.

To the Ministry of Social Services, the camp requested: transparent reporting on the number of children and their expected duration in care to the public; a review of social services' permanent and long-term wards; replace apprehension with in-home supervision; visit the Red Pheasant First Nation; pause adoptions and expanding the foster care system; include cultural and developmental needs of each child with full reports; implement a review process for all foster homes in Saskatchewan to address overcrowding and harm; and "complete a cost analysis on how the ministry is resourcing families so they can stay together or be reunited, relative to costs that are paid to agencies that house children in care".

To the Ministry of Justice and the Attorney General, the camp requested: an investigation into the death of Haven Dubois, or a broader investigation of practices by the RPS's major crimes unit in 2015; conduct an inquiry into the missing and murdered Indigenous men and boys; and revise the Police Act and the Coroners Act.

To the Ministries of Central Services and the Provincial Capital Commission, the camp requested they desist efforts to remove the camp.

Finally, to all ministers, the camp requested they "strike an inter ministerial round table" to meet with the campers in two weeks.

== After the July 2nd meeting ==
On July 13, Regina's officials released and circulated a response to the camp's requests. The letter responds to each request with what the government is already attempting to do regarding the concerns. The letter concludes by stating the government's expectations for the camp to be disassembled.

== Responses ==
The Provincial Capital Commission released the following statement in response:

We recognize freedom of expression as a fundamental right in Canada guaranteed under the Canadian Charter of Rights and Freedoms and under the Saskatchewan Human Rights Code. However, the activities by this group in the Wascana Centre are in violation of a number of restrictions and bylaws that are in place. Activities including overnight camping and fires are prohibited in the park. A permit is required for all activities and protests and this group has yet to contact us for a permit. Contact information to obtain a permit has been provided to this group several times. We want to work together with this group and hope they will reach out to us and abide by the rules, but this has not taken place to-date...

Prime Minister Justin Trudeau responded to the issue on the Global News Morning Show while in Regina, saying "We know there are a lot of deep systemic challenges within our country’s institutions, and not just the justice system when it comes to reconciliation, when it comes to building a strong future for all Canadians, including Indigenous Canadians. That’s why whether it’s on health, whether it’s on education, whether it’s on entrepreneurship, or whether it’s on issues in the justice system, we have an awful lot of work to do."

== Similar protests ==
- On March 4, a group of protesters set up outside Toronto City Hall in response to the acquittals of the accused in Boushie's and Fontaine's deaths.
- On July 10, Saskatoon's Healing Camp for Justice started its 10-day demonstration and ceremony on Saskatoon's Victoria Park.
