= Canadian Justice, Indigenous Injustice =

2019 nonfiction book by Kent Roach

Canadian Justice, Indigenous Injustice: The Gerald Stanley and Colten Boushie Case
- First edition
- Author: Kent Roach
- Language: English
- Genre: Non-fiction
- Publisher: McGill–Queen's University Press
- Publication date: 2019
- Publication place: Canada
- Media type: Print
- Pages: 307

Canadian Justice, Indigenous Injustice: The Gerald Stanley and Colten Boushie Case is a 2019 nonfiction book by Kent Roach, a law professor at the University of Toronto about the trial of Gerald Stanley, who was found not guilty of the 2016 killing of Colten Boushie—a twenty-two-year-old resident of the Red Pheasant First Nation by an all-white jury in an infamous court case in Battleford, Saskatchewan. The book was published by McGill-Queen’s University Press.

== Kent Roach ==
University of Toronto law professor, Kent Roach, who is the author of public policy books—The Supreme Court on Trial and Due Process and Victims' Rights which were on the short list for the Donner Prize, wrote Canadian Justice, Indigenous Injustice in 2019.

== Reviews ==
A review in the Canadian Journal of Law and Society described the book as an "excellent scholarly book" and an "important historical document".

A Canadian Law Library Review (CLLR) review of the 2022 paperback edition of the book, which included a new preface by Roach, said the book was a "valuable investigation" of how indigenous people experience the Canadian justice system.

Roach focused on the "historical, political, social, and legal" aspects of the case, according to a Quill and Quire review.

A 2021 review in the British Journal of Canadian Studies said that Roach—whose book was informed by his previous books and his professional experience—presented an "excellent account of the infamous" court case.

A CBC News' article cited the book, saying that the trial jurors did not receive enough instructions on how to handle a hang fire defence.

The Boushie family raised concerns that Roach had written the book without consulting them.

== See also ==
- Killing of Colten Boushie
