= Killing of Colten Boushie =

2016 shooting in Saskatchewan, Canada

Colten Boushie
- Born: Colten Boushie; October 31, 1993; Ronan, Montana, U.S.
- Died: August 9, 2016 (aged 22) near Biggar, Saskatchewan, Canada

Colten Boushie (October 31, 1993 – August 9, 2016) was a 22-year-old Indigenous man of the Cree Red Pheasant First Nation who was fatally shot on a rural Saskatchewan farm by its owner, Gerald Stanley. Stanley stood trial for second-degree murder and for a lesser charge of manslaughter, but was ultimately acquitted in February 2018.

After getting a flat tire, he and four friends drove to a farmhouse near Biggar, Saskatchewan, owned by Stanley. They had been drinking and had earlier tried to break in to a truck at another farm. One of the group tried to steal an ATV on the property while Stanley and his son were outside. Stanley's son ran to the vehicle and used a hammer to smash the windshield. The people in the SUV attempted to take off and crashed their vehicle into one of Stanley's cars.

Stanley reacted by going into his home, returning with a TT-30 (Tokarev) handgun, and firing two shots into the air. Two of the individuals in the SUV fled on foot, while Boushie moved to the front seat. Stanley then approached the SUV – with Boushie in the driver's seat – when the gun discharged. Boushie was shot in the neck just below the ear and died instantly. Stanley's defence claimed the shot was an accident and the gun's trigger was not pulled. Instead, the defence argued a third round loaded into the magazine was fired, yet failed to detonate, precipitating a hang fire.

The circumstances of the shooting, the RCMP investigation, the trial, and the verdict are flashpoints of controversy in Canada. The case drew significant attention, sparking protests and provoking debates about racism in Saskatchewan and across Canada. People who supported Stanley generally perceived the trial as fair, given the circumstances of events leading up to the shooting. Supporters of the Boushie family felt the trial was unfair due to the selection of what appeared to be an all-white jury.

Canadian Prime Minister Justin Trudeau and Minister of Justice Jody Wilson-Raybould denounced the verdict. Critics scorned these comments for politicizing the trial and discrediting the Canadian judiciary system. The mayor of Saskatoon, Charlie Clark, said the trial and its aftermath represented "a defining moment for this community and this country".

Legislation eliminating peremptory challenges from jury selection was enacted in 2019 and upheld by the Supreme Court of Canada in the October 2020 case R v Chouhan. Two 2021 reports by the Civilian Review and Complaints Commission for the Royal Canadian Mounted Police found that RCMP's death notification to Boushie's family had been discriminatory and noted serious investigative and communications failures in an otherwise professional response.

== Background ==
Colten Boushie (October 31, 1993 – August 9, 2016) was a resident of the Cree Red Pheasant First Nation of Saskatchewan.

The incident took place near Biggar, Saskatchewan.

According to the police Information To Obtain warrant (ITO), which was produced in the early stages of the investigation (Note: The ITO "(laid) out in detail for the first time the police perspective on the facts of the case and the information gathered in the early stages of the investigation. These documents are intended to persuade a judge to issue a warrant; they are not produced with balance in mind, nor do they weigh possibilities that run counter to police theories, but they must be full, frank and fair.") and obtained by The Globe and Mail on August 9, 2016, 22-year-old Colten Boushie and his girlfriend Kiora Wuttunee, Belinda Jackson and her boyfriend Eric Meechance, and Cassidy Cross-Whitstone, all from the Red Pheasant First Nation, had spent the day swimming, drinking, and shooting at the Maymont River. Wuttunee's grey 2003 Ford Escape SUV got a flat tire.

The ITO stated that Boushie's group first visited a neighbouring farm belonging to the Fouhy family, where they "attempted to steal vehicles and items" by trying to smash the window of a truck with a .22 calibre rifle. Cross-Whitstone broke the stock of the rifle in this failed attempt. They then drove on to Gerald Stanley's property near Biggar, Saskatchewan, in the Rural Municipality of Glenside No. 377, which is about 57 kilometres (35 mi) from their home.

When the SUV entered the Stanley property, Gerald Stanley and his son Sheldon were repairing a fence, while Stanley's wife Leesa was mowing the lawn not far away. The SUV's occupants first entered a truck belonging to one of Gerald's customers, then mounted an ATV. Sheldon chased them away and smashed the SUV's windshield with a hammer. It "crashed into Stanley's wife's car and came to a halt".

Stanley took a TT-30 (Tokarev) semi-automatic handgun from his shed, loaded it and "fired warning shots in the air" as Cross-Whitstone and Meechance ran from the ATV and fled the property. Sheldon Stanley went into the house to get his truck keys.

Stanley then approached the SUV with Boushie in the driver's seat and Jackson and Wuttunee in the back. Stanley would later testify he saw the lawnmower his wife was using and thought that she had been run over. He reached in with his left hand to turn off the ignition while holding his handgun in his right hand. The RCMP later found a loaded .22-calibre rifle near Boushie's body.

== Aftermath of the shooting ==
Boushie's supporters expressed frustration with the "flawed and inadequate" police inquiry, stating that it "initially focused more on the actions of the five young Indigenous people than on the killing of Mr. Boushie". The person initially in charge of the investigation was a junior constable; no forensic experts were brought in. The Ford Escape SUV in which Boushie was killed, was "left uncovered, its doors open, for two rainy days, washing away evidence".

On August 10, 2016, a media release from the RCMP said, "A man was declared dead at the scene. Another man 'associated to the property' was arrested by police at the scene without incident. No charges were immediately laid. Three occupants of the vehicle—one woman, one girl and one man—were taken into custody as part of a related theft investigation, police said. Police later identified and located a fourth boy who was in the vehicle."

This release explained that the witnesses to Boushie's killing were taken into custody "as part of a related theft investigation". None of them were charged as the result of a plea deal in exchange for testimony. Ultimately their testimony was deemed inconclusive due to inconsistencies of their accounts.

On August 12, the Federation of Sovereign Indigenous Nations (FSIN) representing 74 First Nations in Saskatchewan, issued a media release expressing disappointment in the way the RCMP presented the shooting incident. The RCMP statement "provided just enough prejudicial information for the average reader to draw their own conclusions that the shooting was somehow justified. The messaging in an RCMP news release should not fuel racial tensions ... The media's initial portrayal of the event made the incident sound like a crime was about to be committed by the passengers in the car." The FSIN called for a review of the RCMP's communication policies and writing guidelines. The FSIN said that the "RCMP news release was biased and not in line with the relationship the FSIN and the RCMP have been building with measures such as the RCMP FSIN Partnership Protocol".

The FSIN blamed the RCMP's August 10 statement for "racially charged social media posts" that were posted on the Saskatchewan Farmers Group's Facebook pages with photos of "farmers carrying firearms". The RCMP Superintendent held a press conference asking "residents to put their guns away". The Federation said that the RCMP media release "made it appear that Boushie's killing was justified" by the "right to defend" and that the way the RCMP shared information about the incident had fuelled racial tensions in Saskatchewan.

On the same day, the RCMP responded to the August 12 FSIN statement.

Three days after the shooting, on August 12, 2016, CBC News reported that the "event had stimulated a lot of discussion on various social media platforms". Paul Dornstauder, CBC's Executive Producer for Radio Current Affairs in Saskatchewan, described how "there was a vigorous and at times rancorous debate about what had happened and why, some of which was racist".

The article was the subject of investigation by CBC's ombudsman, following CBC's receipt of 25 complaints from readers concerned that "it was wrong of CBC News to publish this article, that it fed into a racist argument about Indigenous peoples that saw Mr. Boushie as a menace. It was seen as an endorsement of the use of violence by some readers." One complainant asserted that the article mistakenly linked "property rights" to Boushie's death. The complainant called the article "irresponsible and damaging" as it "could fan racist sentiment". The article has since been revised. Dornstauder described "this story as having had an electrifying effect in Saskatchewan". It is "complex and controversial", requiring sensitivity and "likely will continue to for some time to come".

On August 15, Saskatchewan Premier Brad Wall called the comments "unacceptable, intolerant and a betrayal of the very values and character of Saskatchewan". He described them as "dangerous". More than five hundred comments representing both sides of the debate appeared on Wall's Facebook page in response to his remarks.

By August 17, 2016, the National Farmers Union published a statement in which they expressed their "profound sadness over the tragic shooting of Colten Boushie", and extended "deepest condolences to his family and community" and "as farmers", condemned "the rampant racist remarks that have circulated since the death of Colten Boushie, including comments made on the 'Saskatchewan Farmers' Facebook group".

Robert Innes, a University of Saskatchewan professor, described the "racial tension" in Saskatchewan as a "tinder box" with "some farmers" "blaming First Nations people for rural crime. Their mentality is to protect their property."

== Bail hearing ==
Gerald Stanley's bail hearing was held in North Battleford on August 18, 2016. Hundreds of people protested outside the North Battleford courthouse with RCMP on rooftops observing. On August 19, Stanley was granted bail on a $10,000 cash surety. His bail included a number of conditions, including that he stay within 6.4 kilometres (4.0 miles) of his home and that he have no contact with Boushie's family or any of the witnesses.

== Trial ==
I know this is an emotional case and I know that people are very vested in what's happening, but that can't happen. It's not a sporting event where we're rooting for one team or another.

— Saskatchewan Chief Justice Martel D. Popescul February 8, 2018. Court of Queen's Bench, Court of Queen's Bench, Battleford, Saskatchewan

The trial for second-degree murder took place from January 30, 2018, to February 9, 2018, at the Court of Queen's Bench Saskatchewan in Battleford with Saskatchewan Chief Justice Martel D. Popescul presiding.

The jury selection system allowed trial lawyers to use "peremptory challenges" to reject a limited number of potential jurors without giving a specific reason. Seven hundred and fifty people were randomly summoned based on health cards for potential jury duty from the Battleford Jury Boundary, a huge area that stretches to the north of Saskatchewan. The pool which was almost double the normal size was enlarged to help secure a more representative jury, though only 204 of the 750 individuals who were summoned actually showed up. Five who appeared to be First Nations were challenged by the defence, leaving what appeared to be an all-white jury.

During the trial, Stanley's attorney Scott Spencer said there was "no evidence" that Stanley intentionally killed Boushie. By February 8, 2018, the jurors were deliberating on a verdict behind closed doors. Judge Popescul "warned people in the gallery about making comments during [the] tense trial" and said that "it was the first time in his long career that he had to say that in court based on a complaint from a juror".

During Judge Popescul's charge to the jury, he instructed them:

You must not find Gerald Stanley guilty unless you are sure he is guilty. Even if you believe that Mr. Stanley is probably guilty or likely guilty, that is not sufficient. In those circumstances, you must give the benefit of the doubt to Mr. Stanley and find him not guilty because the Crown has failed to satisfy you of his guilt beyond a reasonable doubt.

If you have a reasonable doubt about Mr. Stanley's guilt arising from the evidence, the absence of the evidence, or the credibility or the reliability of one or more of the witnesses then you must find him not guilty. In short, the presumption of innocence applies at the beginning and continues throughout the trial, unless you are satisfied after considering the whole of the evidence that the Crown has displaced the presumption of innocence by proof of guilt beyond a reasonable doubt.

=== "Hang fire" defence ===
The defence case relied heavily on the assertion that the fatal shot was unintentional and the result of a hang fire. The casing from the fatal shot had an unusual bulge which testing of the gun could not reproduce.

The gun used was a 1947 Tokarev T33 with surplus military ammunition from 1953. The ammunition had been stored in an unheated shed where the temperature varied between 30 °C (86 °F) and −30 °C (−22 °F). Experts concluded nevertheless that the gun was functioning properly and a misfire could not be replicated during testing.

== Verdict ==
Stanley was acquitted on February 9, 2018. Since Canadian jurors are legally barred from discussing the proceedings, it is not known how the jury reached its verdict or whether the jury accepted that the gunshot that killed Boushie was hang fire.

== Impact ==
The case has exposed an ugly side in rural Saskatchewan—landowners who blame Indigenous people for high rates of property crime and First Nations who bear the brunt of that racism and hate.

— APTN News February 8, 2018

The story attracted widespread attention from social media and mainstream media.

Following the announcement of the acquittal, about 1,000 people, including the mayor of Saskatoon, Charlie Clark, gathered at a rally at the Saskatoon court house to show support for Boushie's family and to express frustration with the acquittal. Other rallies and vigils took place in Battleford, Winnipeg, Halifax, Nova Scotia, Toronto, and Ottawa to challenge the verdict. Clint Wuttunee, Chief of the Red Pheasant First Nation, called the verdict "absolutely perverse" and stated that "an all-white jury formed the twisted view of that obvious truth and found Stanley not guilty".

In response to the verdict, Federation of Sovereign Indigenous Nations's Vice-chief David Pratt, challenged the jury selection system, saying that "defence counsel used peremptory challenges to block every potential juror who appeared to be Indigenous". Prime Minister Justin Trudeau issued a statement on February 10, saying, "I am going to say we have come to this point as a country far too many times. Indigenous people across this country are angry, they're heartbroken and I know Indigenous and non-Indigenous Canadians alike know that we have to do better." Saskatchewan Premier Scott Moe said he would be meeting with Trudeau and with First Nations leadership.

Canadian Justice Minister and Attorney General of Canada Jody Wilson-Raybould made a comment in a Tweet that Canada "can and must do better". Jagmeet Singh, a criminal defence lawyer and the Leader of the New Democratic Party, told reporters on February 13 that "justice was not served for Colten Boushie".

Toronto-based criminal defence lawyer Sean Robichaud said that it was "wholly inappropriate for elected officials to publicly undermine findings of a lawfully delivered verdict, particularly when it is one of a jury". He cautioned that there could be ramifications. "By commenting on a particular case, it may affect the ability for Crown to proceed with the case if an appeal is granted." Lisa Raitt, Deputy Leader of the Conservative Party, Rob Nicholson, and other Conservatives also criticised comments by Trudeau and Wilson-Raybould.

At a press conference hosted by Saskatoon Tribal Council, Mayor Clark described the "high-profile trial and its aftermath—which included rallies across Canada—represent a defining moment for this community and this country. A defining moment for our city, our province, our country, where we decide what kind of country we're going to be." The Saskatoon StarPhoenix reported that Clark called for a "prompt reckoning across the country" as the acquittal had sparked "anxiety and anger". Many chiefs across Saskatchewan, including northern communities, travelled to Saskatoon to attend the rally.

The Royal Canadian Mounted Police (RCMP) issued a statement to remind concerned parties to "conduct themselves in a peaceful and civil manner regardless of the outcome", warning that "people will be held responsible for what they say or post online and police will investigate any complaints of suspected criminal behaviour".

On February 10, thousands attended rallies across Canada in a day-of-action activities to support Boushie's family. About 200 people gathered at Toronto's Nathan Phillips Square to protest the verdict that day. On February 12, over 300 people gathered to march from Calgary City Hall to Reconciliation Bridge, in temperatures and wind chill that felt like −28 °C (−18 °F), to show support for Colten Boushie's family.

By February 11, Colten Boushie's mother Debbie Baptiste, his cousin Jade Tootoosis, and uncle Alvin had travelled to Ottawa from their remote community for potential meetings with Wilson-Raybould, Public Safety Minister Ralph Goodale and other ministers, to advocate for justice. They called for "an end to peremptory challenges in jury selection, which were used in Mr. Stanley's trial to block every potential juror who appeared to be Indigenous". They are also challenging "a number of systemic problems in the justice system, as well as specific complaints arising from the way Mr. Boushie's death was investigated and prosecuted".

On February 28, the Justice for our Stolen Children Camp was set up on Wascana Park in Regina in response to the death of Colten Boushie and Tina Fontaine.

nîpawistamâsowin: We Will Stand Up, a documentary film by Tasha Hubbard about the Colten Boushie case, won the award for Best Canadian Feature Documentary at the 2019 Hot Docs Canadian International Film Festival, and the Colin Low Award for Best Canadian Documentary at the 2019 DOXA Documentary Film Festival.

== Post-trial developments ==
=== Legislative changes ===
In response to controversy over how defendant's legal team used peremptory challenge to remove all Indigenous jurors from the jury pool and get what seemed to be an all-white jury, the federal government passed Bill C-75, which eliminated peremptory challenges during jury selection. The law came into effect in September 2019. In October 2020, the Supreme Court of Canada ruled in R v Chouhan that the legislation was constitutional, as well as its retroactive application to jury selection.

=== Civilian Review and Complaints Commission reports into RCMP conduct ===
In March 2021, the Civilian Review and Complaints Commission (CRCC) for the Royal Canadian Mounted Police released two reports on the conduct of the RCMP during the case. One of the reports stemmed from an appeal by the Boushie family of a 2017 RCMP internal investigation into the case in which it mostly cleared itself. Concurrent to handling the appeal the CRCC launched its own public interest investigation to produce a second report. Both reports were completed in 2020 but the release was delayed so that the RCMP could review and reply to the reports. The CRCC found that the way that Boushie's family were notified of his death was discriminatory, but that other RCMP actions were not racially motivated. It also found that with the exception of serious shortfalls in the investigation and the dealings with Boushie's family, the RCMP had otherwise acted professionally and reasonably.

The CRCC found that surrounding the Boushie home with cars, training lights on the home, and approaching the home with carbines drawn was an unreasonable approach to the risk that one of Boushie's companions may have been there and armed. The CRCC also found that a subsequent search of the home violated the Charter, however it found no evidence that the RCMP's tactical decisions or illegal search were racially motivated. This was contested by the Boushie family's lawyer, who said that a similar overreaction would not have occurred to a non-Indigenous family. However, the CRCC did find that the armed, tactical approach was a poor way to deliver the death notification. Asking whether Boushie's mother had been drinking and smelling her breath for alcohol after she took her son's death poorly was found to be insensitive and discriminatory. The CRCC also criticized the RCMP's later decision to update Boushie's mother on the investigation during her son's wake as insensitive.

The main investigative failures involved handling of physical evidence at the crime scene and treatment of witnesses. The vehicle at the centre of the shooting was left uncovered despite having an available tarp and being aware of upcoming bad weather, which led to crucial evidence being destroyed by rainfall. Stanley's wife and son were also allowed to retrieve another vehicle at the crime scene to travel to a police interview together, despite crime scenes normally being restricted and witnesses usually being separated before interviews to avoid cross-contamination of their testimony. The RCMP also failed to warn the Stanleys not to discuss the case, contrary to standard operating procedure. By contrast, Boushie's three companions, who were arrested for criminal mischief that night – charges which were not pursued – were kept overnight in cells, with one witness testifying that she couldn't sleep because she was still covered in Boushie's blood. The interviews were then conducted the next day after police warned them not to incriminate themselves. The CRCC found that historic distrust between RCMP and Indigenous peoples, shock from the shooting, poor rest, potential hangovers, and the RCMP's coercive approach led to poor witness cooperation. The CRCC found that these witness interviews and their continued detainment afterwards were unreasonable.

A separate issue brought up by the CRCC reports involved the Saskatchewan RCMP's press releases, which while factually accurate, disproportionately focused on the allegations of theft. The CRCC found that this fueled the implication that Boushie's death was somehow deserved and inflamed racial tensions. Shortly after the shooting and initial criticism, the Saskatchewan RCMP updated its communications policies. The CRCC also found that there was no evidence that Boushie was engaged in any property offences the night of the shooting.

The reports also criticized the RCMP for destroying recordings and transcripts in August 2018, which detailed radio communications between its officers who had responded to the shooting. The destruction of these records meant the CRCC had less evidence to assess the RCMP justification for its tactical approach to delivering the death notification. The RCMP said that because these records had no evidentiary value to the criminal case against Stanley, they were destroyed following the standard RCMP records retention policy to only keep records for two years. The CRCC investigation of the RCMP's conducts was announced in March 2018, and the Boushie family's civil lawsuit against the RCMP had also been filed before August 2018. The lawyer for Boushie's family said that the records were relevant to both of those cases and should have been retained.

RCMP Commissioner Brenda Lucki agreed with the CRCC's discrimination ruling for the death notification, accepted most of the report's findings such as those on poor handling of evidence and witnesses, and poor communications policies. She committed to fix the issues raised by measures such as new operational guidance, changes to the force's operational manual, and increased cultural awareness training. Lucki contested some aspects of the CRCC report, such as the tactical approach they took for the death notification because of perceived risk from Boushie's companion. The CRCC said Commissioner Lucki's response to their reports failed to take responsibility for the issues at the heart of the report and focused on minor staffing considerations. The National Police Federation, a police union representing over 20,000 RCMP officers condemned the CRCC report and RCMP leadership for accepting some of the reports' recommendations for disrespecting the RCMP and bringing its professionalism into question.

== See also ==
- Canadian Justice, Indigenous Injustice
- Timeline of First Nations history
