= Drag the Red =

Organization based in Manitoba, Canada

Drag the Red is a volunteer grassroots organisation based in Winnipeg, Manitoba. They search the Red River and its banks for the bodies of suicide deaths and missing persons, particularly Missing and Murdered Indigenous Women and Girls (MMIWG). The initiative was started by Bernadette Smith and Kyle Kematch after the death of Tina Fontaine, a 15-year-old girl whose body was found in the Red River in 2014.

The organisation aims to address the high rates of Indigenous people, especially Indigenous women, who go missing and whose bodies are never found. Volunteers search the river in hopes of bringing the missing home to provide closure for the families. The initiative draws public attention to violence disproportionately levied against Indigenous women and the ongoing lack of effective institutional response.

== Background ==
Drag the Red was founded after the death of Tina Fontaine, a young girl from Sagkeeng First Nation whose body was discovered in the Red River wrapped in a duvet cover. Fontaine had been raised by her great aunt but travelled to Winnipeg to find her biological mother. In the days before her death, Fontaine experienced a series of institutional failures. She was picked up by a man in a truck who was stopped by the police and subsequently arrested for driving with a suspended licence. Fontaine, however, was neglected by the authorities and left on the street. Security cameras later captured her passed out in a parking lot. She eventually was taken to a hospital where she was found to be malnourished and under the influence of alcohol and drugs. She was dropped off at a crisis centre, but they allowed her to leave shortly thereafter. Nine days later, Tina Fontaine was found in the Red River. Community outcry emphasised the significant role of institutional negligence that led to Fontaine's death

Drag the Red emerged from a reality of widespread violence against Indigenous women and girls in Canada. A 2014 report following Fontaine's death by the Royal Canadian Mounted Police (RCMP) found that 1,181 Indigenous women were murdered or went missing between 1980 and 2012. Other sources, such as the Native Women's Association of Canada (NWAC), have stated the number is closer to 4,000 when accounting for systemic data gaps. Although Indigenous people represent approximately 4.3% of the Canadian population, Indigenous women account for 16% of homicide victims, making them six times more likely to be murdered than other women in Canada. In Manitoba, where Drag the Red operates, Indigenous people represent 13.6% of the population, but 49% of homicide victims are Indigenous women. Families and activists in and outside of Drag the Red have criticised law enforcement's responses, arguing that cases regarding Indigenous women are often dismissed or treated with less urgency, especially when victims are labelled as sex workers, criminals or addicts. Founder Bernadette Smith mentions how authorities used her sister Claudette Osbourne's mugshot in her missing poster, despite being provided other images.

== Founders and key actors ==
Drag the Red began as a group of about a dozen volunteers with a borrowed boat and a Facebook page. As of April 2025, they have expanded to roughly 3000 volunteers and around 60 active searchers.

The two cofounders, Bernadette Smith and Kyle Kematch, had known each other before starting Drag the Red. According to Bernadette Smith in an interview on CBC in 2021, after losing both of their sisters two years apart, "it created a bond between their families".

Bernadette Smith's advocacy is connected to the disappearance of her sister Claudette Osbourne whose death drew attention to systemic bias in the treatment of missing Indigenous women in 2008, six years before Fontaine's case. Smith was elected to the Legislative Assembly of Manitoba in 2017, representing the electoral district of Point Douglas as a member of the New Democratic Party (NDP).

Kyle Kematch lost his sister Amber Guiboche in 2010; her case was also characterised by police negligence. He at one point left his job to dedicate himself to the search full time. After his death in 2021, his daughter Kyrra Kematch continued participating in Drag the Red.

== Volunteers ==
The organisation is composed entirely of volunteers, many of whom have personal connections to missing individuals. The work is described by participants as emotionally and spiritually demanding but deeply meaningful. Volunteers voice an intense connection to the work, describing feeling compelled to continue dragging no matter how gruelling, hoping to find whatever they find. In anticipation of the release of 'The River', a short documentary on Drag the Red, the National Film Board of Canada created an Instagram account, "What Brings Us Here", to highlight the stories of volunteers.

== Operations ==
Drag the Red operates in the months of May to October when the Red River is thawed. They search for signs of human remains including clothing, hair, skin, bone fragments, and bloodsoaked items. When matter is recovered, volunteers report findings to police and post information on social media in hopes that families of missing persons may recognise them. The organisation has helped recover three bodies: that of two men and a woman. More bodies have been recovered from the Red River by law enforcement since the organisation's beginnings in 2014.

Drag the Red has two groups of volunteers:

- Some drag the river almost daily in peak season. Using motorboats and canoes, these volunteers drop metal bars with hooks into the water, pulling them across the river until they snag objects.
- The majority of the volunteers conduct shoreline searches using detectors and manual digging.

== Funding and equipment ==
Most of the equipment Drag the Red uses is either hand-built or makeshift, reflecting limited resources.

Drag the Red receives no financial support from the Winnipeg municipal government or police services and relies heavily on public donations and fundraising initiatives. Donations fund fuel, safety and search equipment, life jackets, and maintenance of boats and tools. In June 2021, the organisation received a custom-made search boat funded by a $50,000 donation from the private-sector union Unifor and Indigenous liaison Gina Smoke. The vehicle was designed to drag heavy equipment along the river bottom and can pull up to 300 pounds (140 kg).

Volunteers have also received guidance from professionals, including Emily Holland, an anthropology professor at Brandon University, who teaches volunteers how to properly identify human remains during shoreline searches.

== Grassroots justice ==
Drag the Red represents a grassroots response to institutional failures in policing and justice: "Policing protocols, legal and bureaucratic lingo, absence of information, and redacted documents keep families veiled from knowing or understanding what is going in investigations and are dependent on a system that is directly linked to an unacknowledged colonial logic and ongoing violence". Police argue that dragging the river would be ineffective and that black-water diving in the Red River is extremely dangerous, and therefore, not worth the investment of resources and time. In response, communities organise their own search efforts. These initiatives take the form of community-based justice and decolonial activism, emphasising mutual support and collective care within Indigenous communities. Grassroots activism in this context also seeks to keep the stories of missing individuals alive, and connect families with community resources. Critics of existing investigative systems, policing protocols, and bureaucratic procedures argue that the processes often leave families without information or meaningful participation in investigations, in turn favouring Drag the Red's approach.

== Influence ==
"Reclaiming Power and Place" was the title of the final report of the Missing and Murdered Indigenous women inquiry, reflecting the aim and purpose of Drag the Red alongside the art and initiatives the organisation has inspired.

The National Film Board of Canada's documentary "This River", directed and narrated by Katherine Vermette, documents the work of Drag the Red volunteers. The play "Rise, Red River" by Tara Beagon won the Governor General's Literary Award for Drama in 2025. It was inspired by the work of Drag the Red. The play is performed in Anishinaabemowin, English, and French, following a woman searching a river for the stories of her self, her loved ones, and her culture.

=== Related initiatives ===
Drag the Red has inspired several initiatives focused on safety and advocacy, especially Indigenous-led activism and organisations in the Winnipeg area.

- CommUNITY 2024: CommUNITY 2024 is a twenty two person patrol team that is made up of many former and current members of Drag the Red. They also adopt a grass roots approach to water safety. They offer river patrol services, support, and safety to people living and playing near Winnipeg waterways. Their organisation is focused on supporting underserved youth and homeless populations. Volunteers are trained in harm reduction, water rescue, and paramedic training.
- Coalition for Families of Missing and Murdered Indigenous Women of Manitoba: This group, also made up of former and current members of Drag the Red, provide toolkits to help families navigate. media coverage, document communications with police, and organise search efforts. They also often collaborate with Drag the Red.
- Taken: "Taken" is a documentary TV series project that researches and presents cases of Missing and Murdered Indigenous women and girls in Canada. Bernadette Smith, one of Drag the Red's co-founders, was a head researcher.
