= Death of Tina Fontaine =

Death of a First Nations girl in Manitoba

Tina Fontaine
- September 2013 school photograph of Tina Fontaine
- Born: Tina Michelle Fontaine; 1 January 1999; Winnipeg, Manitoba, Canada
- Disappeared: 8 August 2014 (aged 15); Downtown Winnipeg
- Died: c. 10 August 2014 (aged 15)
- Body discovered: Red River, Winnipeg
- Resting place: Sagkeeng First Nation, Manitoba, Canada

Tina Michelle Fontaine (1 January 1999 – c. 10 August 2014) was a First Nations teenage girl who was reported missing and died in August 2014. Her case is considered among the high number of missing and murdered Indigenous women and girls (MMIWG) of Canada, and her death renewed calls by activists for the government to conduct a national inquiry into the issue.

In December 2015, a suspect was charged with second-degree murder in Fontaine's case. However, no forensic evidence or eyewitnesses directly linking him to her death was presented, and the cause of her death was never established. The accused was acquitted by a jury in February 2018.

The case of Tina Fontaine prompted the Canadian government to commit to creating an independent national inquiry to look into MMIWG.

Fontaine was buried next to her family in Sagkeeng First Nation, 121 km (75 mi) northeast of Winnipeg, Manitoba.

== Background ==
Fontaine's paternal grandfather was a residential school survivor, and his experiences as a child led to years of severe alcoholism and violence. At the age of 12, her father, Eugene Fontaine, left his home in Sagkeeng First Nation to move to Winnipeg, where he fended for himself on the streets. In Winnipeg, he developed an addiction to alcohol.

Fontaine's mother, Valentina (Tina) Duck, was raised in Bloodvein First Nation, 250 km (160 mi) north of Winnipeg. Starting at the age of six, Duck was removed from and returned to her mother several times by Child and Family Services (CFS). Duck experienced a number of significant traumas as a young child, which the Manitoba Advocate for Children and Youth (MACY) said in a 2019 report "were not appropriately addressed." At the age of 10, Duck was taken from her family permanently. After that, she was moved repeatedly, began to be sexually exploited by adults, and started to use alcohol and drugs. MACY says little was done to intervene and protect her.

When Fontaine's parents met, her mother was a 12-year-old child in care, and her father was 23. CFS records show that it knew their relationship was sexual and that Fontaine's father had a past involving violence and severe addictions. Files noted that her mother would frequently run away from her foster placements to stay with Fontaine's father. In 1994, Duck shared with her case worker that she felt "depressed," "suicidal," "isolated, alone, and unloved."

In the spring of 1996, at the age of 14, Duck gave birth to her first child, who was immediately and permanently taken from her by CFS.

== Early life ==
Tina Fontaine was born on January 1, 1999, in Winnipeg and was her mother's second child. In June 2000, her mother gave birth to a third.

When she was one year old, Tina was removed from her family's care for the first time by CFS. It happened again when she was two, after which she was returned to the care of her father. When Fontaine was five, her father placed her and her younger sibling with her great-aunt and -uncle, Thelma and Joseph Favel, through a private guardianship arrangement.

Fontaine lived with her great-aunt and -uncle for nearly a decade in Powerview-Pine Falls, Manitoba (next to Sagkeeng First Nation), except for a brief stay in Selkirk.

In 2011, when she was 12, her father (age 41) was beaten to death, and the two perpetrators were convicted of manslaughter. Fontaine's aunt recalled that her father's violent death deeply affected the girl: "She was very hurt, very lost. That's when she drifted away." Despite being eligible, Fontaine did not receive grief counselling following her father's death. In a 2019 report, MACY noted that CFS was clearly aware that she was struggling in the period between her father's death and her own. Records from the time document that Fontaine was increasingly absent from school; missed assignments; had been suspended from school; got into verbal confrontations and physical fights that resulted in the police being called; received medical treatment for self-harm; and had been reported missing three times. During this period, her family repeatedly asked for help from CFS.

== Disappearances and discovery ==
In early 2014, at the age of 15, Tina Fontaine went to Winnipeg to visit her mother. By that time, Duck had lost custody of her children as a result of her involvement in sex work and her struggle with alcoholism. On 17 and 18 July, Fontaine was under Child and Family Services (CFS) care in Winnipeg, housed at a downtown hotel.

On 31 July 2014, Fontaine was reported missing to Winnipeg Police Service (WPS). Her aunt Lana later said that Fontaine had stayed with her during the August long weekend (1–3 August). On 5 August, Fontaine telephoned her CFS worker and was subsequently picked up by members of CFS and WPS. What happened to Fontaine between 5 and 8 August is unclear, but she remained a missing youth. She presented at a youth shelter in the early morning hours of 8 August, but left shortly thereafter. At 5:15 am on 8 August, two police officers encountered her in a truck with an allegedly drunk driver as part of a traffic stop, but did not take her into custody, even though she was known to be missing. The two constables were suspended for their actions and left the police force.

At 10 am, she was found passed out in an alleyway near the University of Winnipeg. She was escorted to the Health Sciences Centre for treatment. While at the hospital, Fontaine mentioned to her CFS worker that she had been associating with a 62-year-old man named Raymond Cormier. After being medically cleared for discharge, Fontaine was checked into a downtown hotel placement, which she soon left.

An 18-year-old woman who claimed to have been with Fontaine shortly before she disappeared told CBC News of events that she said happened in the hours leading up to Fontaine's disappearance. Identified by CBC News as "Katrina", she said that after she met Fontaine between 10 and 11 pm on 7 August, they went to eat at the Macdonald Youth Services emergency shelter at around 2:30 am. Katrina said she believed Fontaine was drunk, and requested the shelter staff keep her overnight, but that Fontaine refused to stay and refused to give her name. She said that after seeing Fontaine get into the truck and the encounter with the police, she lost contact with Fontaine until around 8 pm, after Fontaine left the hotel where she was staying. At around 3 am the following morning, she said the two were approached on Ellice Avenue by a man who offered Fontaine money to perform a sex act. Katrina said Fontaine accepted and left with the man, and that Katrina followed them but lost sight of the two in the dark. Fontaine was reported missing again on 9 August.

At around 1:30 pm on 17 August, a body was found wrapped in plastic and a duvet cover and weighed down with rocks in the Red River. The body was identified as that of Fontaine's the following day. Police believe she had died on or around 10 August. An autopsy was unable to conclusively determine a cause of death.

== Trial ==
Raymond Joseph Cormier (aged 53) was charged with second-degree murder in December 2015. He pleaded not guilty.

The trial began 29 January 2018. A witness testified that the last time that he saw Fontaine, she was arguing with Cormier because he had sold her bicycle frame for drugs. The Crown did not introduce any forensic evidence or eyewitnesses to directly link Cormier to Fontaine's death, and the cause of her death remained undetermined. The largely circumstantial case relied on the suspect's statements that were secretly recorded during a police sting operation. Cormier's lawyers argued that, without a determination on the cause of death, it could not be known for certain that she died as a result of an unlawful act, and that Cormier should be acquitted "on that [argument] alone." Cormier was found not guilty on 22 February 2018.

On 13 March 2018, Crown prosecutors announced that they would not appeal the case.

== Aftermath and legacy ==
Fontaine was buried on Sagkeeng First Nation next to her father. A memorial was placed at the site on the first anniversary of the discovery of her body at the Red River.

In response to Fontaine's death, the Canadian Human Rights Commission requested an inquiry into the number of missing and murdered Indigenous women (MMIW) in Canada. The RCMP already had such a study underway, which was completed in 2014. Acting Chief Commissioner David Langtry wrote, "Once again our hearts are filled with grief and sadness as we mourn the brutal and senseless murder of an Aboriginal girl. Tina must not disappear into the oblivion of statistics." With the change in government, in December 2015, Prime Minister Justin Trudeau announced that a national inquiry titled "Missing and Murdered Indigenous Women and Girls" would be undertaken. Five independent commissioners were appointed, and commissioners and staff began to consult with families, activist organizations, and others about how to structure the inquiry.

Also in response to the death, a volunteer group known as Drag the Red was formed. They have begun to regularly drag portions of the Red River to find bodies or evidence in missing persons or homicide cases. Tina's death also led to the creation of the Bear Clan Patrol, which promotes safety and crime prevention in Winnipeg's North End. Additionally, a local Inuk woman, Holly Jarrett, has started social media campaigns: the #AmINext hashtag and a Change.org petition in response to Fontaine's death. The hashtag campaign called for a national inquiry and allowed Indigenous women to express their feelings about the issue of MMIW.

Manitoba's Child and Family Services (CFS) announced that, as of 1 June 2015, it would no longer place children in hotels. The Strong Hearted Buffalo Women Crisis Stabilization Unit, a semi-secure crisis intervention program for Indigenous girls considered to be at risk of sexual exploitation, was created in the fall of 2015 in response to Fontaine's case. Through federal funding, the Ndinawe Youth Resource Centre renamed itself "Tina's Safe Haven" and launched a 24/7 safe space for youth in November 2018.

After Cormier's acquittal, Indigenous leaders in Manitoba criticized governmental systems for not protecting Fontaine: "We as a nation need to do better for our young people," said Grand Chief Sheila North, of Keewatinowi Okimakanak. Carolyn Bennett, federal Minister of Crown-Indigenous Relations, tweeted: "Tina's is a tragic story that demonstrates the failures of all the systems for Indigenous children and youth on every level... we need to fix this." A day after the end of the trial, over a thousand people marched in Winnipeg to honour Fontaine and support her family.

On 28 February 2018, the Justice for our Stolen Children Camp was set up on Wascana Park in Regina in response to the death of Fontaine and Colten Boushie. The next month, political activist Indygo Arscott held a rally outside Toronto City Hall to voice outrage in memory of Fontaine due to Cormier being found not guilty of the crime. In March 2019, Manitoba Advocate for Children and Youth's Daphne Penrose released a report documenting Fontaine's life and the shortcomings of the agencies that were meant to protect her.

== See also ==
- List of solved missing person cases (2010s)
- List of unsolved murders (2000–present)
