= Martel D. Popescul =

Canadian judge

The Honourable Mr. Justice Martel D. Popescul

Chief Justice of Court of King's Bench for Saskatchewan
- Incumbent
- Assumed office January 1, 2012
- Preceded by: Robert D. Laing

Personal details
- Born: August 10, 1955 (age 71) Bengough, Saskatchewan
- Education: University of Regina; University of Saskatchewan

Martel D. Popescul (born August 10, 1955) is the Chief Justice of the Court of King’s Bench for Saskatchewan. He was appointed Chief Justice effective January 1, 2012, after serving on the Court since 2006.

Popescul was born in Bengough, Saskatchewan, and lived on a farm near Kayville in that province for the first several years of his life. He moved with his family to Regina where he attended high school at Campbell Collegiate. He obtained a Bachelor of Arts from the University of Regina in 1976 and a Bachelor of Laws from the University of Saskatchewan in 1979.

Popescul articled with the province's Department of Justice, and was called to the Saskatchewan Bar in 1980. He worked as a Crown Prosecutor in Prince Albert for two years before joining Sanderson Balicki Popescul law firm in that city, where he had a diverse practice that included criminal and family law and civil litigation. Appointed Queen's Counsel (Canada) in 1992 and Queen's Counsel (Saskatchewan) in 2000, Popescul served as a Bencher with the Law Society of Saskatchewan from 1997 to 2003 and was President in 2001.

Prior to, and even following his appointment to the Court in 2006, Popescul presented at numerous legal education seminars, the Bar Admission Course and the Canadian Centre for Professional Legal Education (CPLED) program. He was also on the faculty of the Trial Advocacy Workshop for 15 years, and has served on the Workshop's Planning Committee.

Chief Justice Popescul received the Saskatchewan Legal Education Society's Outstanding Volunteer Award (North) in 2005 and its Award of Excellence for Legal Education Development in 2008. In 2012, Popescul received the Queen Elizabeth II Diamond Jubilee Medal, to honour significant contributions and achievements by Canadians during the 60th year of Queen Elizabeth II's reign.

== Controversy ==
Chief Justice Popescul presided in the case against Battleford area farmer Gerald Stanley in the shooting death of 22-year-old Colten Boushie from the Cree Red Pheasant First Nation. Stanley was acquitted on February 9, 2018. The verdict by the all-white jury gained national media attention, and resulted in rallies and vigils in locations such as Saskatoon, Battleford Winnipeg, Halifax, Nova Scotia, Toronto, and Ottawa. Clint Wuttunee, Chief of the Red Pheasant First Nation, challenged the jury selection process. Scott Spencer, the defence attorney, explained that said there was a lack of evidence proving Stanley's intent to kill Boushie. Saskatoon mayor Charlie Clark said the case was a "defining moment for this community and this country".
