= Red Pheasant 108 =

Indian reserve in Saskatchewan, Canada

Coordinates: 52°57′48″N 108°31′22″W

- Indian reserve
- Red Pheasant Indian Reserve No. 108
- Location in Saskatchewan
- First Nation: Red Pheasant
- Country: Canada
- Province: Saskatchewan

Area
  - Total: 25,308.4 ha (62,538 acres)

Population (2016)
  - Total: 519
  - Density: 2.05/km^{2} (5.31/sq mi)
- Community Well-Being Index: 46

Red Pheasant 108 is an Indian reserve of the Red Pheasant Cree Nation in Saskatchewan. It is about 33 kilometres (21 mi) south of North Battleford. In the 2016 Canadian Census, it recorded a population of 519 living in 136 of its 163 total private dwellings. In the same year, its Community Well-Being index was calculated at 46 of 100, compared to 58.4 for the average First Nations community and 77.5 for the average non-Indigenous community.

== See also ==
- List of Indian reserves in Saskatchewan
