= Hang fire =

Unexpected delay after firearm triggering

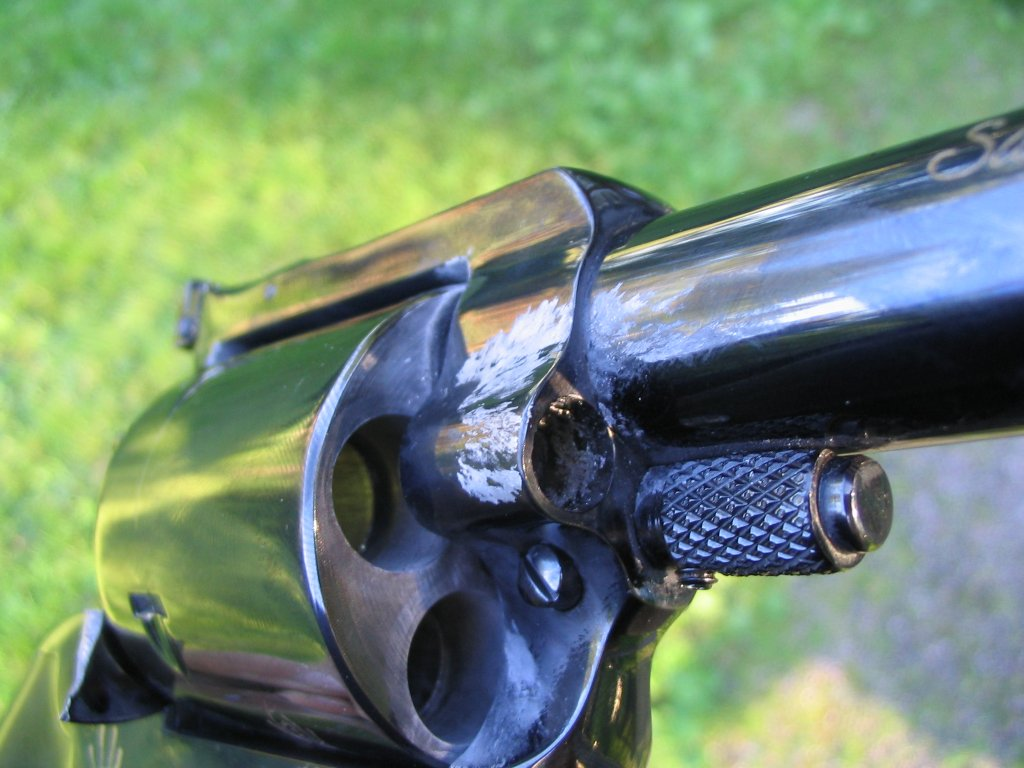
Revolver that has suffered from a hang fire

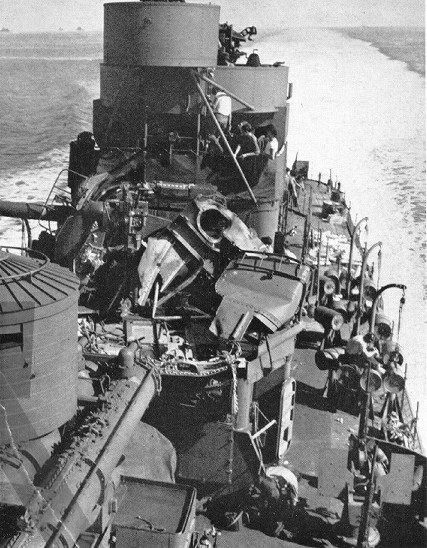
USS Nicholas (DD-449) suffered a hang-fire 127 mm (5 inch/ 38 caliber) gun mount on 13 May 1943, resulting in the gun exploding with no casualties

Hang fire is an unexpected delay between the triggering of a firearm and the ignition of the propellant. This failure was common in firearm actions that relied on open primer pans, due to the poor or inconsistent quality of the powder, although modern firearms are also susceptible. The delay is usually too brief to be noticed, but can be several seconds. A hang fire should be suspected whenever a firearm fails to fire, but has not clearly malfunctioned.

== Ignition sequence ==
The ignition train of modern firearms begins with detonation of a small quantity of impact-sensitive primary explosive in a primer in cartridge firearms or in a percussion cap in muzzleloaders. The energy released by this detonation is intended to ignite the propellant charge of gunpowder or smokeless powder. Primary explosives may deteriorate with age so they release less energy; and propellants damaged by moisture or lubricants may require more energy to ignite. These conditions may either delay the ignition sequence or cause a misfire if ignition is completely prevented. While a normal ignition sequence causes the firearm to discharge immediately when the trigger is pulled, a hang fire will be perceived as a click when the hammer falls followed by the loud noise of suddenly expanding gas when the firearm discharges. The delay may be only a fraction of a second or may last for several seconds.

== Procedures ==
A shooter may interpret the initial click of the hammer fall as an unloaded firearm or a misfire. A hang fire delay of a fraction of a second may be fast enough to correct that misinterpretation before the shooter takes inappropriate action to reload; but a longer delay may allow the shooter time to move the firearm so the muzzle points in a different (and possibly unsafe) direction, or to open the action so the cartridge is no longer confined. Unexpected discharge after the firearm has been moved from the firing position will damage whatever is in front of the muzzle, and large-caliber firearms may injure the shooter during recoil. Unexpected discharge as the action is being opened will allow a portion of the propellant energy to burst the cartridge case and possibly damage the firearm with a risk of injury to the shooter and nearby persons.

The correct procedure is to keep the firearm pointed at a safe target for thirty seconds, then remove the round. This rule is usually not followed in combat, where being without a working firearm is the bigger risk.

== Legacy ==
The phrase "to hang fire" has come to mean a delay in progressing, for example from one task to another.

== See also ==
- Squib load
- Firearm malfunction
