= Red Pheasant Cree Nation =

Plains Cree in Saskatchewan Canada

- Band No. 346
- ᒥᑭᓯᐘᒌᕽ (Cree) mikisiwacîhk (Cree)
- People: Cree
- Treaty: Treaty 6
- Headquarters: Cando
- Province: Saskatchewan

Land
- Main reserve: Red Pheasant 108
- Land area: 253.084

Population (2021)
- On reserve: 820
- On other land: 1
- Off reserve: 1,715
- Total population: 2,536

Government
- Chief: Cody Benson
- Council: Lux Benson; Jason Chakita; Mandy Cuthand; Dana Falcon; Henry Garidpy; Samuel Wuttunee; Shawn Wuttunee

Tribal Council
- Battlefords Agency Tribal Chiefs

Website
- facebook.com/redpheasantcreenation

The Red Pheasant Cree Nation (Cree: ᒥᑭᓯᐘᒌᕽ, mikisiwacîhk) is a Plains Cree First Nations band government in the Canadian province of Saskatchewan. The band's sole reserve, Red Pheasant 108, is 33 km (21 mi) south of North Battleford.

== History ==
Chief Wuttunee's people were living along the Battle River when the Numbered Treaties were being negotiated. Wuttunee did not want to sign Treaty 6 but appointed his brother Red Pheasant to sign in his place, and the Department of Indian Affairs henceforth referred to them as the Red Pheasant Band.

In 1878, they settled on a reserve in the Eagle Hills. A day school and an Anglican church were opened there within a decade.

In 2019, Chief Wuttunee secured the return of the original treaty medal which had been stolen in 1890 off the body of a deceased Chief.

In 2020, Chief Clinton Wuttunee was re-elected to the position of Chief. However, his election and that of one other band councillor were annulled amid substantiated allegations of electoral fraud, including vote buying. This decision was appealed to the Federal Court of Appeal by Chief Wuttunee and the other band councillor on the basis that any vote buying conducted by them had not been decisive in the election. The appellate court affirmed the annulment of the election, noting the lower court's finding that "Chief Wuttunee and Councillor Nicotine had occupied leadership positions within the RPFN, and that, as such, they were supposed to lead by example. Instead of acting as “bulwarks of First Nation democracy”, however, they endeavoured to corrupt the democratic process."

In August 2022, they became a signatory of the Buffalo Treaty.

== Demographics ==
The band has 2,536 registered members, 821 of whom live on the reserve or other band lands and 1,715 live off reserve.

== Notable people ==
- Alex Decoteau, Olympian; first Aboriginal police officer in Canada
- Don Francks (Iron Buffalo), actor, vocalist and jazz musician
- Gerald McMaster, artist, author, and curator
- Robert-Falcon Ouellette, university professor, soldier, federal politician and first Chair of the All Party Indigenous Parliamentarian Caucus in Ottawa.
- Poundmaker (Pîhtokahanapiwiyin), Plains Cree chief known for his role in the North-West Rebellion
- Cree Summer, American actress raised on the Red Pheasant reserve
- Michelle Good, author, winner of the Governor General's Award for English-language fiction in 2020 for Five Little Indians
- Allen Sapp, Plains Cree Artist, OC, SOM, Grand Nephew of Chief Poundmaker, Grandson of Flying Eagle
- Colten Boushie, Youth killed by local farmer, Gerald Stanley, after being confronted during attempted robbery. Gerald Stanley's Not guilty verdict sparked outrage on the reserve and changes to justice system.
