= Monarchy in Saskatchewan =

Role of the Canadian monarchy in Saskatchewan

King in right of Saskatchewan
- Provincial
- Coat of arms of Saskatchewan

Incumbent
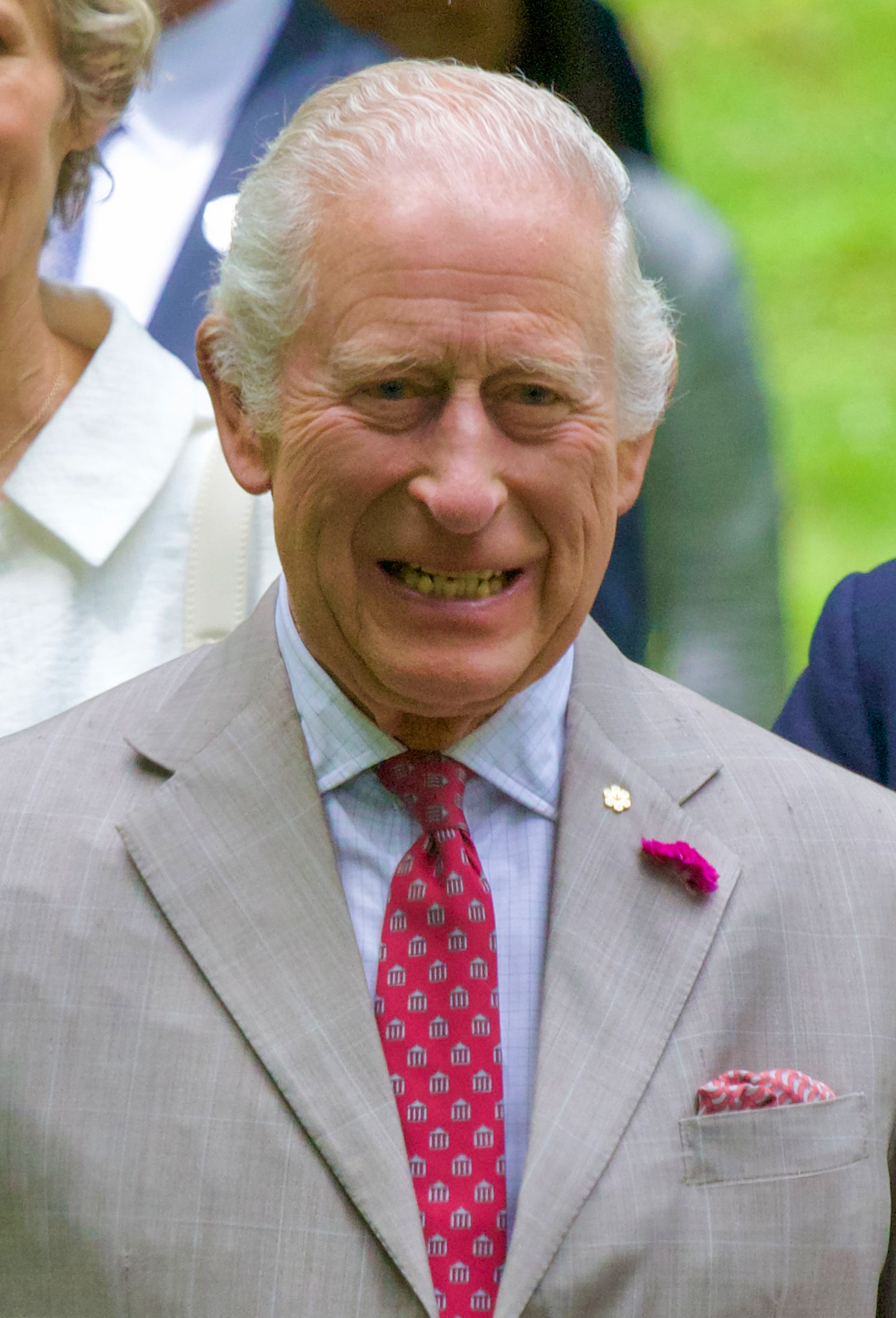
- Charles III; King of Canada since 8 September 2022

Details
- Style: His Majesty
- First monarch: Edward VII
- Formed: 1 September 1905

By the arrangements of the Canadian federation, the Canadian monarchy operates in Saskatchewan as the core of the province's Westminster-style parliamentary democracy. As such, the Crown within Saskatchewan's jurisdiction is referred to as the Crown in right of Saskatchewan, His Majesty in right of Saskatchewan, or His Majesty the King in right of Saskatchewan. The Constitution Act, 1867, however, leaves many royal duties in Saskatchewan specifically assigned to the sovereign's viceroy, the Lieutenant Governor of Saskatchewan, whose direct participation in governance is limited by the conventional stipulations of constitutional monarchy.

In Saskatoon, the most populous city in Saskatchewan, connections to the crown are visible in visits from the Sovereign of Canada, the Canadian Royal Family and vice-regal representatives, and also in the prominence of names and symbols in civic traditions. The Crown's image appears in the centrepiece portrait at Saskatoon City Council chamber and also in the badges of Saskatoon Police Service officers. On one of several visits to Saskatoon, Queen Elizabeth II said "Constitutional Monarchy has always placed the emphasis on people in community – as it were, a national family with the Sovereign as its head." Saskatoon's manifold connections include more than a dozen royal visits, frequent vice-regal visitors, namesakes for schools, streets and neighbourhoods, and the regular inclusion of its own namesake, the saskatoon berry, on menus for royal and vice-regal functions. Canada's 2008 definitive postage stamp features a photograph of Queen Elizabeth II taken in Saskatoon.

== Constitutional role ==
The role of the Crown is both legal and practical; it functions in Saskatchewan in the same way it does in all of Canada's other provinces, being the centre of a constitutional construct in which the institutions of government acting under the sovereign's authority share the power of the whole. It is thus the foundation of the executive, legislative, and judicial branches of the province's government. The Canadian monarch—since 8 September 2022, King Charles III—is represented and his duties carried out by the Lieutenant Governor of Saskatchewan, whose direct participation in governance is limited by the conventional stipulations of constitutional monarchy, with most related powers entrusted for exercise by the elected parliamentarians, the ministers of the Crown generally drawn from amongst them, and the judges and justices of the peace. The Crown today primarily functions as a guarantor of continuous and stable governance and a nonpartisan safeguard against the abuse of power. This arrangement began with the granting of Royal Assent to the 1905 Saskatchewan Act, and continued an unbroken line of monarchical government extending back to the mid 17th century. However, though Saskatchewan has a separate government headed by the King, as a province, Saskatchewan is not itself a kingdom.

Gordon and Naomi Barnhart at a 2006 Monarchist League of Canada event, during their first year as Saskatchewan's viceregal couple

Government House in Regina is owned by the sovereign only in his capacity as King in right of Saskatchewan and is used both as an office and as an official event location by the lieutenant governor, the sovereign, and other members of the Canadian Royal Family. The viceroy resides in a separate home provided by the provincial Crown and the King and his relations reside at a hotel when in Saskatchewan.

=== Governance ===
Municipal authority is vested in the mayor and ten councillors that constitute Saskatoon City Council. Its powers are set by the Province of Saskatchewan largely through the Cities Act, which makes several references to the Crown. As of 2008, at the centre of its meeting chambers hung a photographic portrait of Queen Elizabeth II. Governors general normally pay civic calls on their first visits to municipalities, which include meetings with the mayor and other councillors. On this and other special occasions, the mayor wears a chain of office, part of the mayoral regalia, in a tradition that races its roots to the Crown in medieval times. The mayor presented Saskatoon's key to the city, another medieval tradition, to the Queen in 2005. The municipal police force, the Saskatoon Police Service is one of a few police agencies to have armorial bearings, granted by the Chief Herald of Canada in 2007. Its badge follows the conventional municipal structure, ensigned by the Crown, indicating that the officers enforce the King's peace and the justice of the Crown.

== Royal associations ==
Those in the Royal Family perform ceremonial duties when on a tour of the province; the royal persons do not receive any personal income for their service, only the costs associated with the exercise of these obligations are funded by both the Canadian and Saskatchewan Crowns in their respective councils. Monuments around Saskatchewan mark some of those visits, while others honour a royal personage or event. Further, Saskatchewan's monarchical status is illustrated by royal names applied regions, communities, schools, and buildings, many of which may also have a specific history with a member or members of the Royal Family. Gifts are also sometimes offered from the people of Saskatchewan, via the Office of Protocol and Honours, to a royal person to mark a visit or an important milestone; for instance, Princess Elizabeth, Duchess of Edinburgh (later Queen Elizabeth II), was in 1951 given two paintings by Robert Newton Hurley and works were commissioned from Catherine Perehudoff for Queen Elizabeth The Queen Mother. Unofficial gifts are also offered on various occasions, including a carload of locally milled flour from Yorkton for Princess Elizabeth on her marriage in 1947, and Royal Family members and viceroys have been conferred honorary degrees by Saskatchewan universities. (Note: Princess Anne, Princess Royal, for instance, was awarded her first Canadian honorary degree by the University of Regina in 2004, for her charitable work, and the University of Saskatchewan granted six degrees on viceroys between 1955 and 2006.)

Associations also exist between the Crown and many private organizations within the province; these may have been founded by a Royal Charter, received a royal prefix, and/or been honoured with the patronage of a member of the Royal Family. Examples include the Globe Theatre, which is under the patronage of Prince Edward, Earl of Wessex, and the Royal Saskatchewan Museum, which received its royal prefix from Queen Elizabeth II in 1993. At the various levels of education within Saskatchewan, there also exist a number of scholarships and academic awards either established by or named for members of the Royal Family, such as the Queen Elizabeth II Scholarship in Parliamentary Studies and the Queen Elizabeth II Centennial Aboriginal Scholarship.

The main symbol of the monarchy is the sovereign himself, his image (in portrait or effigy) thus being used to signify government authority. A royal cypher, crown, or the provincial arms (known as the Arms of His Majesty in right of Saskatchewan) may also illustrate the monarchy as the locus of authority, without referring to any specific monarch. Additionally, though the monarch does not form a part of the constitutions of Saskatchewan's honours, they do stem from the Crown as the fount of honour, and so bear on the insignia symbols of the sovereign. The King or others in his family may bestow awards in person: in 2004, the Princess Royal presented to 25 recipients the Saskatchewan Protective Services Medal, marking the first time a member of the Royal Family had presented a provincial honour in Canada, and, when the Queen was in the province in 2005, she appointed Saskatchewan citizens to the Royal Victorian Order. Similarly, under the authority of the Queen in right of Saskatchewan, other members of the Royal Family have received Saskatchewan honours. (Note: Prince Charles, Prince of Wales, and Prince Edward, Earl of Wessex, were both inducted into Saskatchewan Order of Merit (in 2001 and 2005, respectively) and both the Earl of Wessex and his wife, Sophie, Countess of Wessex, were in 2005 awarded the Commemorative Medal for the Centennial of Saskatchewan.)

=== Civic names ===
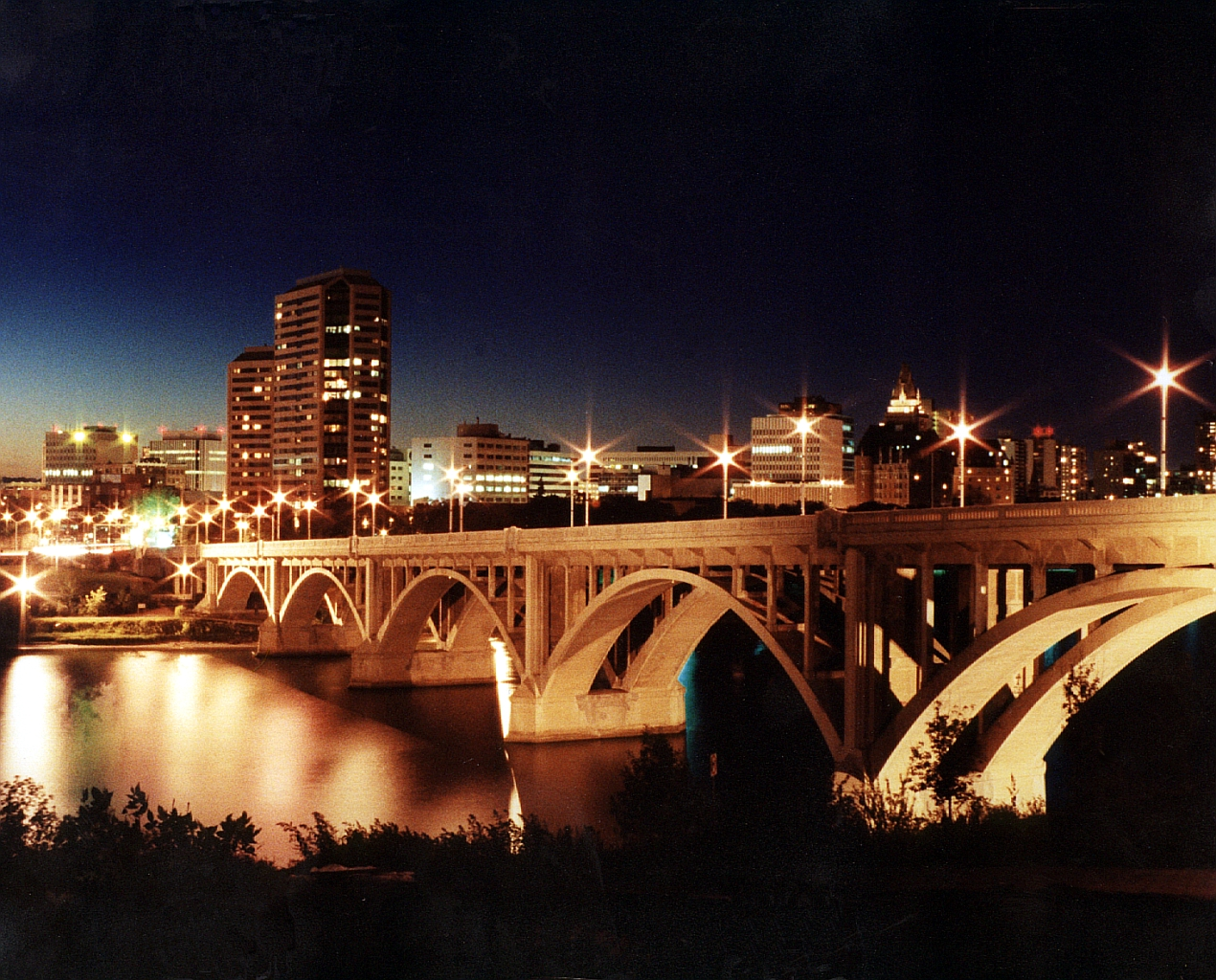
Saskatoon's Broadway Bridge might have been renamed for King George V.

Place names provide information about the landscape and settlement of an area. Several among the names of neighbourhoods, parks and streets in Saskatoon have connections to the Crown. One of its most recognisable features is the Broadway Bridge, an arch bridge that spans the east and west river shores. It was at one time considered that the bridge should be renamed for King George V. Neighbourhoods of note include King George near the city centre. Once home to celebrated athlete Gordie Howe, most of its homes were built prior to World War II. Queen Elizabeth is another mature area. Most of the homes were built during and soon after World War II, and several among its streets have royal namesakes. Massey Place is named for Canadian Governor General Vincent Massey. Most of its homes were constructed in the 1960s and 1970s. McNab Park, near the airport, is named for Lieutenant Governor Archibald McNab and also for his son, a noted pilot in World War II. It was built as a station for the armed forces in 1967, and has since been used as a low-income housing development.

Parks with royal namesakes include Victoria Park, named for Queen Victoria. Spanning 38.8 acres (157,000 m^{2}), it is one of the oldest and most scenic public spaces. It is home to badminton and tennis clubs and a civic swimming pool. The south river bank between the Broadway Bridge and University Bridge was dedicated Coronation Park for King George VI after his coronation in 1937, later to be renamed Cosmopolitan Park in 1952. Princess Diana Multi-District Park is named for Diana, Princess of Wales, and its construction was undertaken a year after her death, in 1998. Massey Park, which spans 1.7 acres (6,900 m^{2}) in the Nutana neighbourhood, is believed to be named for Governor General Vincent Massey. The playing fields at Nutana Collegiate are the last remnant of the Louise Grounds, named for Princess Louise, Duchess of Argyll, daughter of Queen Victoria and wife of Governor General the Marquess of Lorne.

Streets named for monarchs and their consorts include Albert Avenue, Alexandra Avenue, Edward Avenue, Victoria Avenue and William Avenue. Some named for royal family titles including Duchess Street, Duke Street, Empress Avenue and Street, King Crescent and Street, Prince of Wales Avenue, Princess Street and Queen Street, while others named for royal houses include Hanover Avenue and York Avenue, and some named for royal castles include Balmoral Street, Osborne Street and Windsor Street. Albany Crescent and Alberta Avenue can trace their namesakes less directly to royal family members. Governors General are remembered in many streets including Aberdeen Place, Alexander Avenue, Argyle Avenue, Byng Avenues, Connaught Avenue and Place, Devonshire Crescent and Way, Dufferin Avenue, Grey Place, Hnatyshyn Avenue, Lansdowne Avenue, Lisgar Avenue, Lorne Avenue, Massey Drive, Michener Court, Crescent, Place and Way, Minto Place and Vanier Crescent and Way. Others including Fedoruk Drive, Munroe Avenue, Patterson Crescent and Worobetz Place, are named for Lieutenant Governors.

=== Education ===
Saskatoon's educational institutions have connections at various levels to the Crown. Several public schools are named for its personages. Schools such as King George School, St. Joseph High School, and Buena Vista School have hosted royal and vice-regal visitors. Graduates of the University of Saskatchewan have been appointed as representatives of the monarch, and its campus has been a venue for royal ceremonies on multiple occasions. As of 2001, schools in Saskatoon were provided with portraits of the Queen by the federal and provincial governments. Classrooms once sang the royal anthem "God Save the Queen" on a regular basis, but it is now generally limited to such special occasions as remembrance ceremonies, armed forces events, convocations and worship services. Students learn about the Crown through such topics as government structure, aboriginal treaties and Canadian Confederation. Students in some secondary schools once belonged to groups named for the royal houses of Lancaster, Stuart, Tudor and York, such as at Walter Murray Collegiate in the 1960s.

==== Grade schools ====
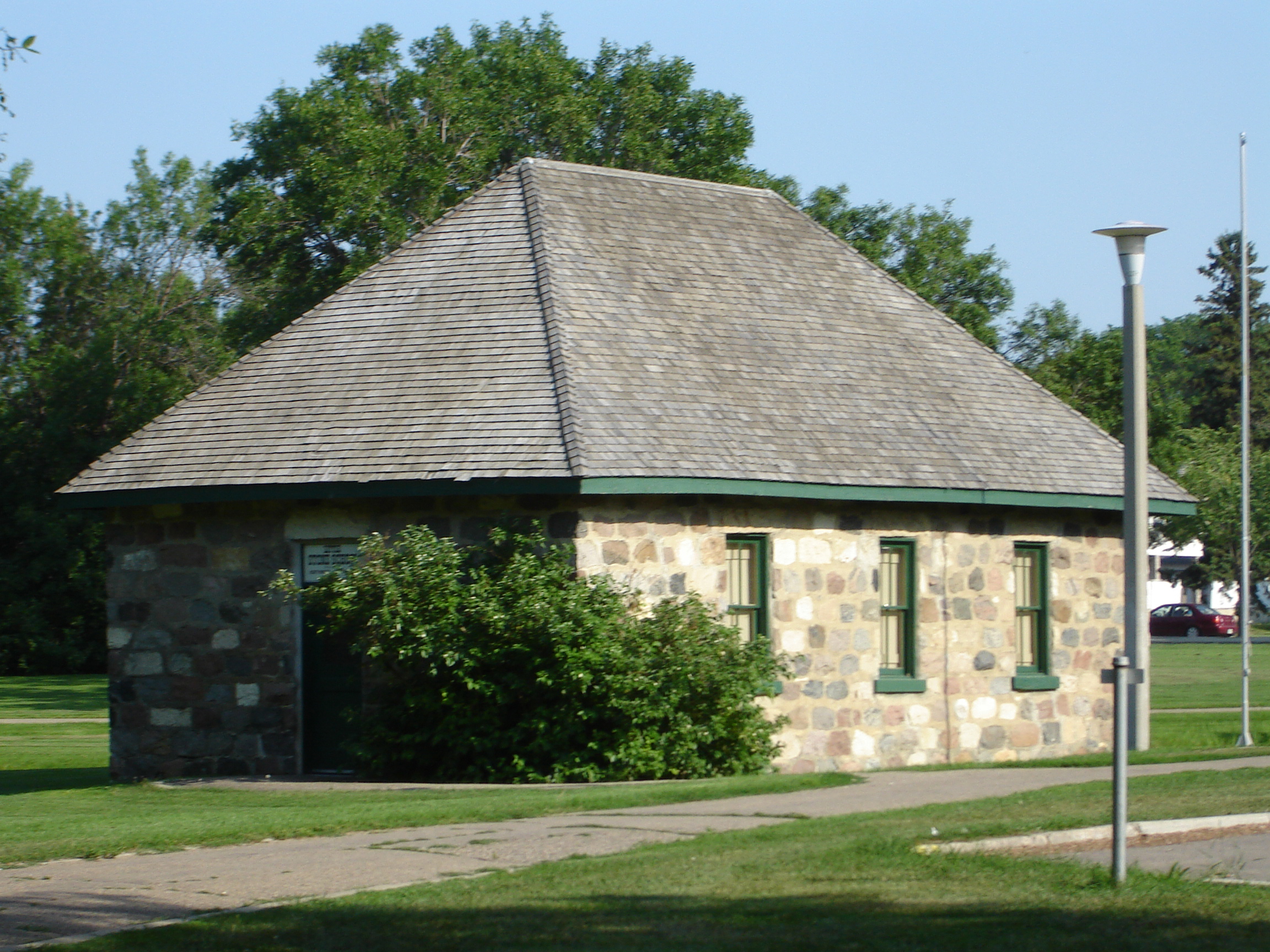
Original Victoria School House, University of Saskatchewan.

May I say how pleased I am to be here in a school named after my great-grandfather, King George V. I am glad to see that you still remember him through the pictures and artefacts on display in your entrance hall ... Saskatchewan’s relationship with the Sovereign continues to be rich and diverse.

— The Princess Royal, Saskatoon, 2004

Several grade schools have royal and vice-regal namesakes. École Victoria School is one among a number of primary schools named for monarchs and their consorts, named for Queen Victoria, who reigned over Canada between 1867 and 1901. The modern school was built in 1909 on the site of the original one-room Victoria School House, built by Alexander Maur in 1888. The school house was relocated to the University of Saskatchewan and was re-opened in tandem with the coronation of King George V in 1911. It was later restored and opened to the public as an historical site in 1967. Governor General Ramon Hnatyshyn attended the school, which is administered in the Saskatoon Public School Division. King George School is named for King George V, who reigned over Canada between 1910 and 1936. It was named Prince of Wales School before his accession to the throne. It was built in the collegiate Gothic style by Scottish-born architect David Webster, who constructed several schools in Saskatoon. Renowned hockey player Gordon Howe attended the school, and the Princess Royal visited it for an honours presentation in 2004. Princess Alexandra School is the result of the combination of Princess School and Alexandra School after the latter was demolished in 1984. Opened only a few years apart on the same lot, in 1907 and 1912, both schools honoured Queen Alexandra in a name chosen through a newspaper contest. The current building replaced the original Princess School, which was sold and demolished in 1961. King George, Princess Alexandra, and the newer Queen Elizabeth and Prince Philip primary schools are also administered in the Saskatoon Public School Division. Two former schools also have royal namesakes. First opened in 1904, King Edward School housed the Saskatoon City Hall Chambers between 1912 and 1956, when it was demolished. Another school of the same name was constructed in a nearby location. It was demolished in 1980, and is now the site of the King Edward Place seniors' residence. Webster built Albert School on the same plan as King Edward School, and it is believed to be named for Prince Albert. It is today the Albert Community Centre. Three primary schools named for Canadian vice-regals include Roland Michener, Vincent Massey and Georges Vanier schools, named for Governors General Michener, Massey and Vanier, respectively. The first two are public schools, and the third is administered in the Greater Saskatoon Catholic School Division. Vincent Massey School is in the neighbourhood with the same namesake, and was opened in 1964. An educator from Georges Vanier School was recognised by the Governor General for teaching excellence in 2007.

==== Higher education ====
The University of Saskatchewan has numerous royal and vice-regal connections. Lieutenant Governor Archibald McNab is credited with bringing the institution to Saskatoon. Its campuses have been venues for royal and vice-regal visits, including visits by Queen Elizabeth II and the Duke of Edinburgh, who lodged at the President's Residence in 1978. A handful of University alumni were invited to a reception for Canadians at Buckingham Palace ahead of that visit to Saskatoon. The main campus is home to Saskatoon's only royally designated institution, the Royal University Hospital. The Diefenbaker Canada Centre, also on campus, houses original correspondence between Queen Elizabeth II and Prime Minister John Diefenbaker, and has staged such exhibits as Happy and Glorious: The Royal Presence in Canada, opened by Lieutenant Governor Lynda Haverstock in 2004. The campus was the first in Western Canada to host the Vanier Cup, named for Governor General Georges Vanier, in 2006. Fifteen fellows of the Royal Society of Canada are affiliated with the University of Saskatchewan.

Lieutenant Governors have filled the office of Visitor to the University of Saskatchewan since its establishment. Lieutenant Governor Sir Richard Lake was famously called upon to assume the Visitor's role in the so-called Crisis of 1919. Four senior members of the Board of Governors had been dismissed after three among them abstained from a vote of confidence in University President Walter Murray. Murray was under scrutiny for his maintenance of University finances. The public and press clamoured for an explanation, and, in accordance with provincial law, Lake held a series of hearings through the office of the King’s Bench. His findings, delivered in April 1920, vindicated the dismissals, saying they were “regular, proper and in the best interest of the university.” In other words, their acts of disloyalty were enough to cost them their jobs.

Certain vice-regal representatives have held teaching and governance positions on campus. Before becoming Lieutenant Governor, Gordon Barnhart was University Secretary and Professor in Canadian Politics, and after his tenure as Lieutenant Governor returned to teaching at the U of S. In 2014, he became the first former Lieutenant Governor to be appointed president of the university. Sylvia Fedoruk was University Chancellor, Professor in Oncology and Associate Member in Physics. Grant MacEwan, before becoming Lieutenant Governor of Alberta, was Director of the School of Agriculture and Professor of Animal Husbandry at the University of Saskatchewan. Honorary Doctor of Laws degrees have been conferred by the University on vice-regal representatives. Recipient Lieutenant Governors include William Patterson in 1955, Robert Hanbidge in 1968, Stephen Worobetz in 1984 and Sylvia Fedoruk in 2006. Recipient Governors General include Vincent Massey in 1955 and Ramon Hnatyshyn in 1990.

The Saskatchewan Normal School was a publicly funded provincial training institution for teachers in Regina, Saskatoon and Moose Jaw. The cornerstone of the Saskatoon building was laid by Lieutenant Governor Henry Newlands in 1921. The three normal schools trained thousands of teachers until the Regina and Saskatoon buildings were taken over in 1940 to accommodate military training. Teacher training resumed after World War II in Saskatoon and Moose Jaw.

=== Armed forces ===
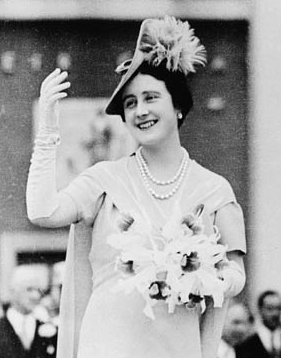
Queen Elizabeth presented the Saskatoon Light Infantry its colours overseas in 1941.

Command of the Canadian Forces is vested in the king. Saskatonians trace their connections to its army division through the Saskatoon Light Infantry (SLI), formed after the reorganisation of the North Saskatchewan Regiment in 1924. In December 1936, the SLI was amalgamated with “C” Company, 12th Machine Gun Battalion, to form the Saskatoon Light Infantry (Machine Gun), which was mobilised in September 1939. The 1st Battalion of the regiment was sent to the United Kingdom in December 1939, as part of the 1st Canadian Division. Queen Elizabeth inspected the unit in April 1940, after which officers posed with her for a photograph. In April 1941, the Queen presented the unit with gifts of socks, mittens, caps, pullovers, scarves and helmets. In October 1941, the unit was presented its colours by the Queen.

I am very glad of this opportunity of being with you once again ... I know that to many of you these months of waiting have seemed very long, and that your thoughts must often have turned to your homes, and to your wives and families whom you have left in Canada. I know too how much your dear ones must be praying for you, and how they are thinking with pride of the part that you have been called upon to play in guarding these shores.

— Queen Elizabeth to the Saskatoon Light Infantry, 1941

In July 1943, the 1st Battalion, SLI (Machine Gun) landed in Sicily and fought in the Italian campaign until March 1945, when it was transferred to the Netherlands. 1st Battalion, SLI (Machine Gun), returned to Canada in November 1945. Its battle honours include: Sicily, Ortona, Liri Valley, Hitler Line, Gothic Line, Lamore Crossing, Rimini Line, and Apeldoorn. The 2nd Battalion SLI (Machine Gun) remained in Canada as part of the Reserve Army. The Saskatoon Light Infantry was the only infantry unit from northern Saskatchewan to see active service overseas during World War II. It has since been amalgamated into the North Saskatchewan Regiment, and presented new colours by Governor General Jules Léger in 1975.

Canadian Forces Maritime Command also maintains connections with Saskatoon. His Majesty's Canadian Ship (HMCS) Unicorn is a land-based ship established in 1923, and its base is in downtown Saskatoon. Its name derives from a long line of ships dating to medieval times. It operated as a recruitment centre during World War II, enlisting over 3,500 men and women into the Royal Canadian Navy. HMCS Unicorn organised a visit by Princess Elizabeth and the Duke of Edinburgh in 1951. The ship's company also participated in a Battle of the Atlantic parade with HMCS Saskatoon. On her first official visit in 2000, Governor General Adrienne Clarkson hosted a public levee at the facility. His Majesty’s Canadian Ship (HMCS) Saskatoon is built to accommodate a crew of up to 41 sailors and patrols Canadian west coast waters. Lieutenant Governor Lynda Haverstock sailed on board from Esquimalt Harbour to Victoria Harbour in 2006, to visit her crew and observe how she manoeuvres. Haverstock, who was given a lesson on how to drive the ship, presented its commanding officer with the Commemorative Medal for the Centennial of Saskatchewan. In 2005, the ship's company were presented the key to the city at a parade in Saskatoon. The original HMCS Saskatoon was in service between 1940 and 1945, and the current ship was commissioned in 1998.

=== Sport and leisure ===
The University of Saskatchewan Huskies football team has an enduring connection with the national university championship, the Vanier Cup. Both the championship and its trophy are named for Governor General Georges Vanier, who granted his permission in 1965. The Huskies have participated in the final championship game on nine occasions between 1989 and 2006, and have been awarded the Cup on three occasions in 1990, 1996 and 1998. The University hosted the first ever championship held in western Canada at its renovated Griffiths Stadium in 2006. The Huskie Athletics programme comprises student athletes who compete in elite interuniversity competition administered by Canadian Interuniversity Sport and its members, both as regions and as individual institutions. At various times in its history, the programme has offered teams in twenty-four different sports. The Duke and Duchess of York helped to publicise the Canada Summer Games on their visit to Saskatoon in 1989. Two years prior to their visit, Queen Elizabeth II inaugurated the Canada Summer Games Boating and Rowing Facility ahead of the event. The Canada Games are a high-level multi-sport event held every two years, alternating between the Winter Games and Summer Games. Athletes are strictly amateur, and represent their province or territory. Since its inception in 1967, the event has played a prominent role in developing some of Canada's premier athletes.

=== Landmarks ===
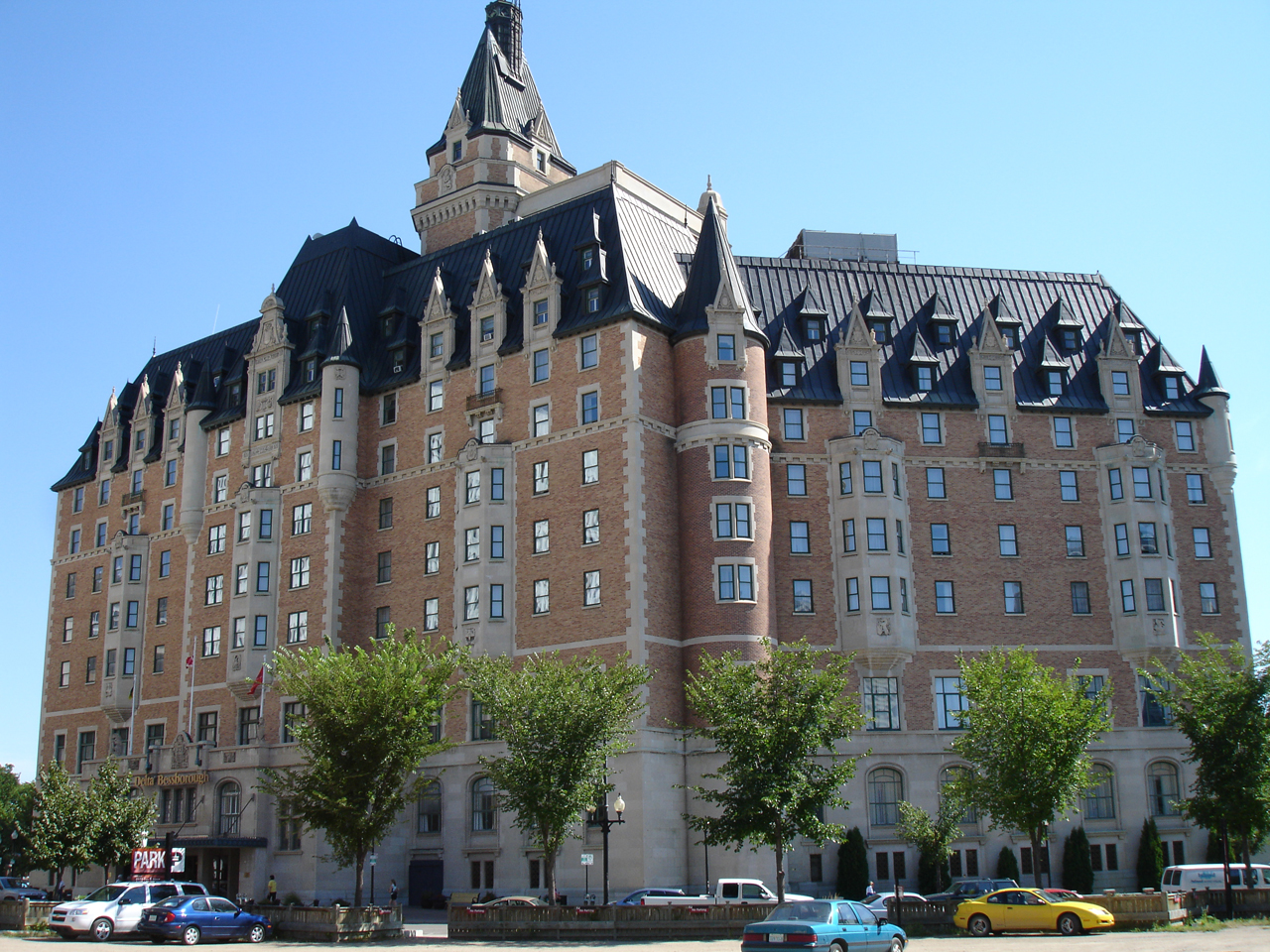
Delta Bessborough hotel in Saskatoon.

Several landmarks have particular connections to the Crown. Those on the riverfront include the Royal University Hospital on Hospital Drive, the Delta Bessborough hotel on Spadina Crescent East, a Statue of Ramon Hnatyshyn at Spadina Crescent East and 24th Street East, the Prince of Wales Promenade at Spadina Crescent East and Duchess Street, St. John's Cathedral on Spadina Crescent East, and the Queen Elizabeth Power Station on Spadina Crescent. Inside the downtown area are situated the Connaught Block on Third Avenue, the King George building at Second Avenue North and 23rd Street East, and the Patricia Hotel on Second Avenue North, as well as those landmarks which have disappeared, including the Queen's, King Edward and Royal hotels. A number of private apartment buildings around the city also have royal namesakes.

- Royal University Hospital: One of a handful of royal designations in the province, it is on the eastern river bank on the university campus. It is the main trauma centre in the province, a seven-story facility housing maternal and child services, neurosurgery and cardiovascular surgery. It delivers a comprehensive health programme in partnership with the university medicine college. Queen Elizabeth II granted its royal designation and bestowed it a Royal Coat of Arms in 1990, forty-five years after it was opened by premier Tommy Douglas. Governor General Roméo LeBlanc toured the hospital on visiting Saskatoon in 1995.
- Delta Bessborough: Governor General the Earl of Bessborough consented to its naming in 1931 and visited it while under construction in 1932. Situated on the western river bank, the Château-style structure was constructed with stone, brick and tiles from the prairies. Its facilities include the private gardens that are the main venue for the Sasktel Saskatchewan Jazz Fest, while its vice-regal suite is the principal accommodation for vice-regal visitors. Governor General Adrienne Clarkson said on visiting that she believed it was "so much a part of our history, belonging to that chain of great hotels which traced the opening of the west across our country; because of its location on the banks of the Saskatchewan River with such marvellous views, and ... because of its connection with my British predecessor, Lord Bessborough."
- Queen Elizabeth Power Station: Originally named the South Saskatchewan River Generating Station, Saskatoon's natural gas-fired station was recommissioned by Queen Elizabeth II on her visit in 1959. The city's 382-megawatt power generation plant is on its southwestern outskirts. Production of electricity from waste heat results in a reduction of greenhouse gas emissions equal to those of 30,00 cars. Saskatoon's water treatment process begins at the station, from which a base supply of water is pumped to the main treatment plant.
- Cathedral of St. John the Evangelist: A municipal heritage property, its cornerstone was laid by Governor General the Duke of Connaught in 1912. Queen Elizabeth II and the Duke of Edinburgh worshipped at St. John's in 1951, 1959 and 1987, as did Governor General Viscount Alexander in 1948. It was the venue for a provincial memorial service for Queen Elizabeth The Queen Mother, which drew mourners including representatives from government, the armed forces and community organisations. Lieutenant Governor Lynda Haverstock said that the late Queen "touched the lives of thousands of people whom she greeted with her characteristic warmth, including those who had the good fortune to meet her when she visited Saskatchewan" in her remarks at the memorial service.
- Statue of Ramon Hnatyshyn: Saskatonian and Governor General Ramon Hnatyshyn is remembered in a bronze statues that stands opposite St. John's cathedral, created by Bill Epp in 1992. It was part of a controversial demonstration entitled Artist as Politician: In the Shadow of the Monument by artist Taras Polataiko, who produced its mirror image by painting himself bronze and standing before it motionless. His plaque read "Dedicated to Ukrainian Canadians Who Never Became the Governor General", and the performance drew the attention of national and international news media.

Other downtown landmarks include the Connaught Block, named for Governor General The Duke of Connaught, and built by Frederick Blain in 1912. The Patricia Hotel is named for his daughter, Princess Patricia of Connaught (Lady Patricia Ramsay). The King George, Saskatoon's oldest standing hotel, named for King George V. Although its condition declined since its elegant beginnings, renovation and conversion into retail, office and condominium spaces was undertaken by a developer in 2007. Beneath the exterior ceramic tiles lies a façade of terracotta and stone and the upper floors once included niches which held a series of terracotta knights in armour. Three other hotels which have disappeared include the Queen's Hotel on First Avenue, believed to have been named for Queen Victoria, the Royal Hotel, constructed during the same period, and the King Edward Hotel, constructed in 1906. The first frame structure of the Queen's Hotel was built in the 1880s and replaced by a stone building in 1892–1894, and this was in turn replaced by a larger and more elegant building in 1911. The hotel was destroyed by fire in 1980. Across the river from the university hospital is the Prince of Wales Promenade, a popular viewpoint along riverfront trails, opened by the Prince of Wales in 2001. Several schools have historic connections to the Crown, including Ecole Victoria School, King George School, and Albert Community Centre, a municipal heritage property.

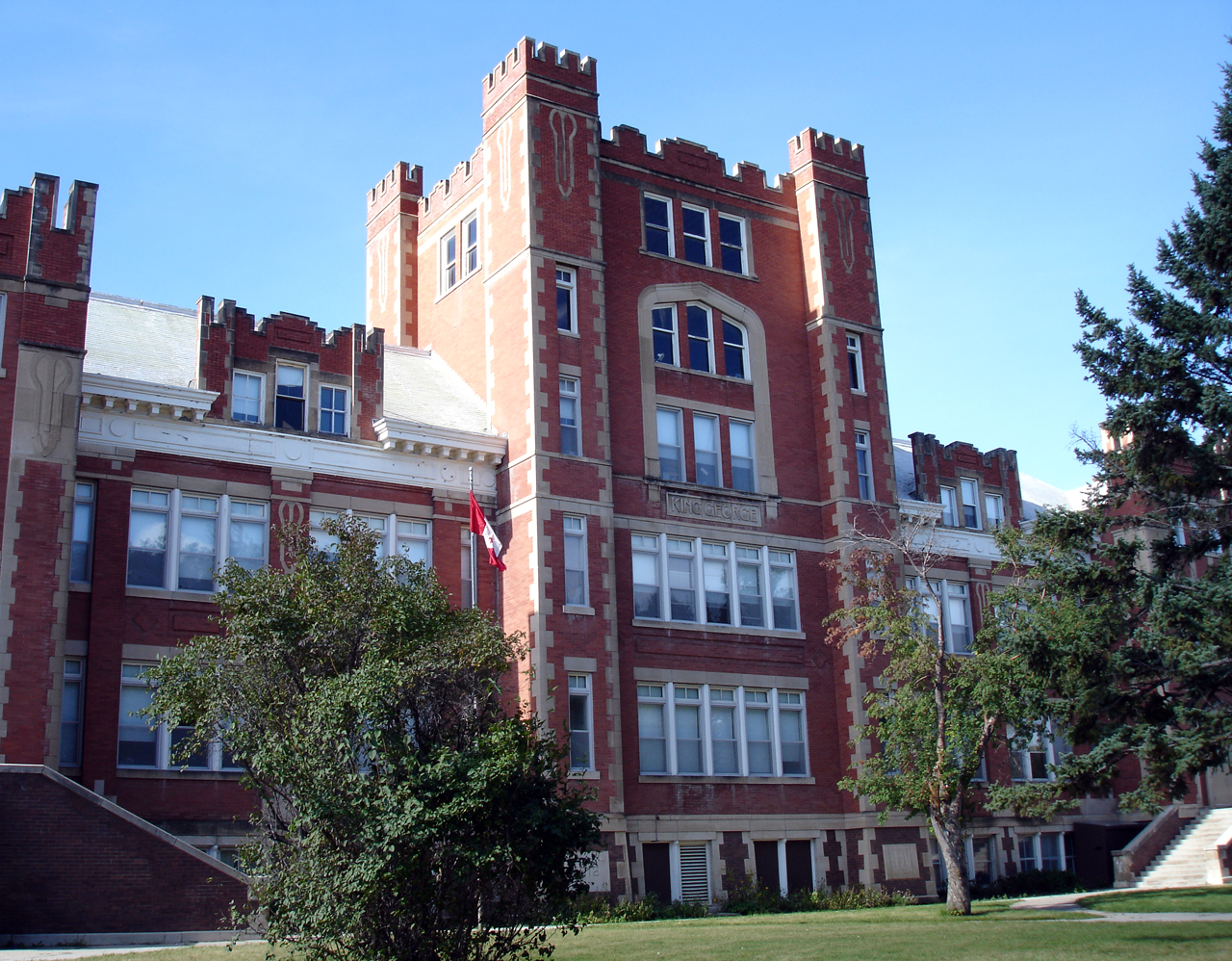
King George School in Saskatoon, named for King George V

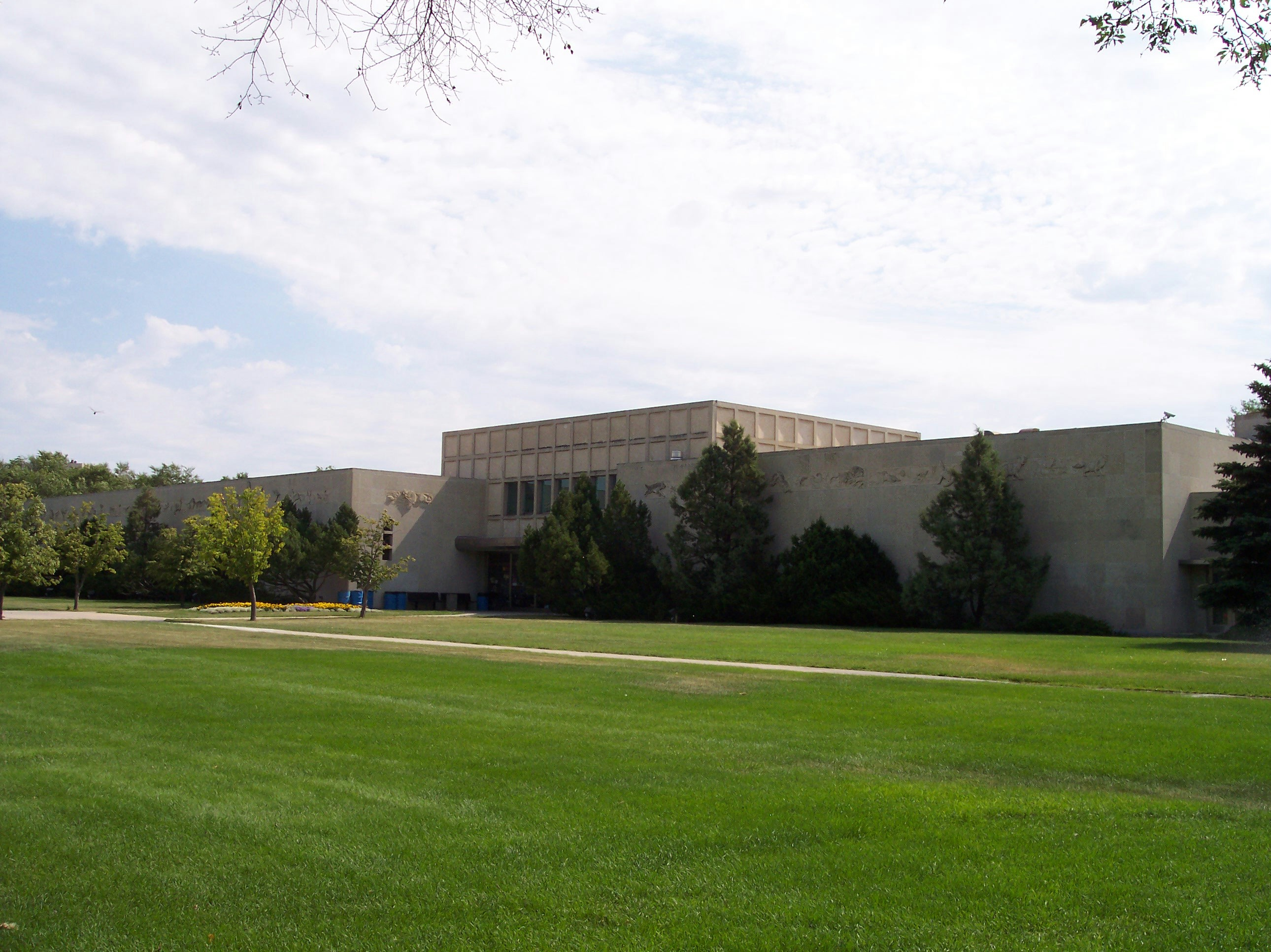
The Royal Saskatchewan Museum in Regina

An equestrian statue of Queen Elizabeth II on the grounds of the Saskatchewan Legislative Building

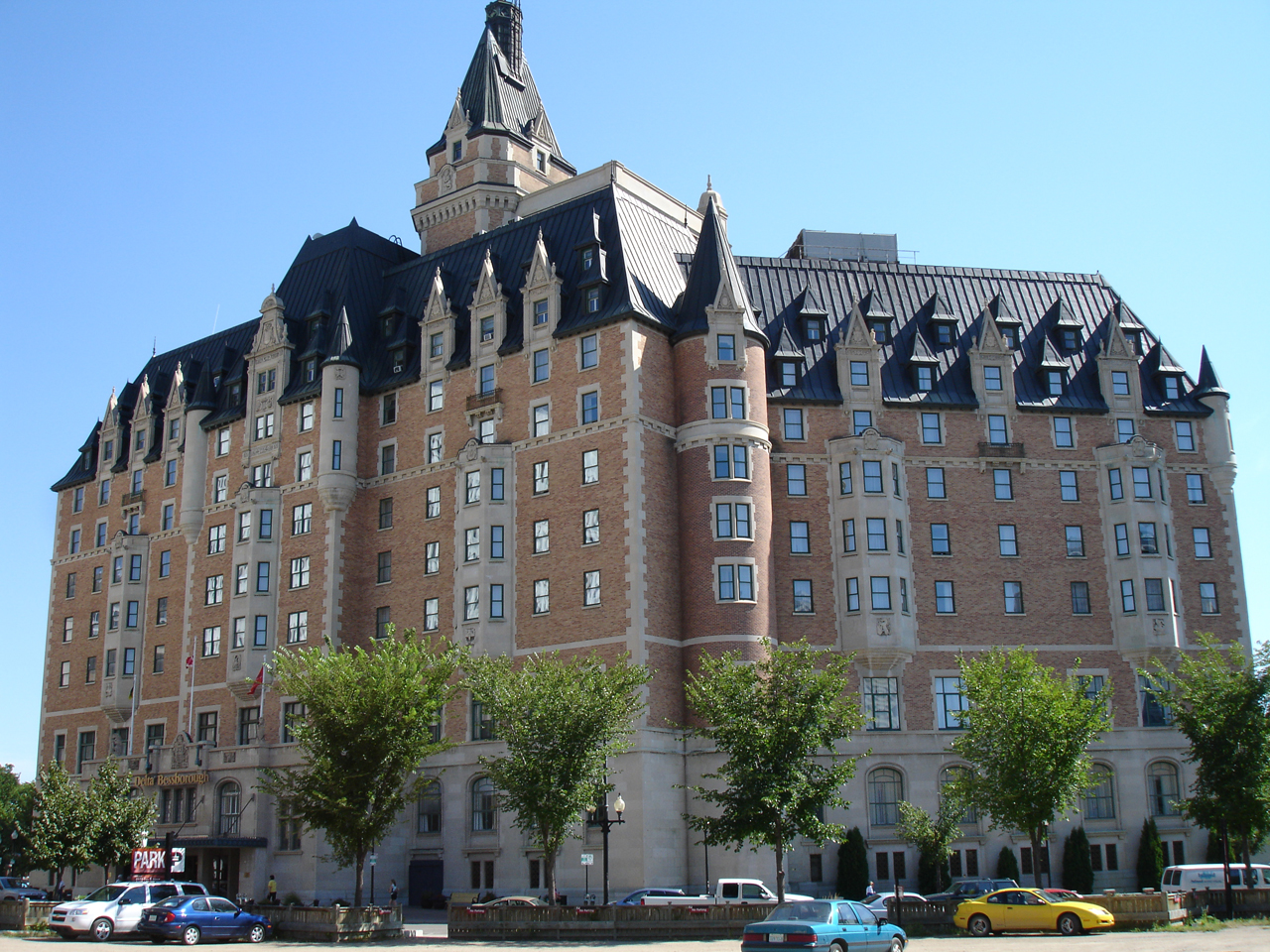
Delta Bessborough

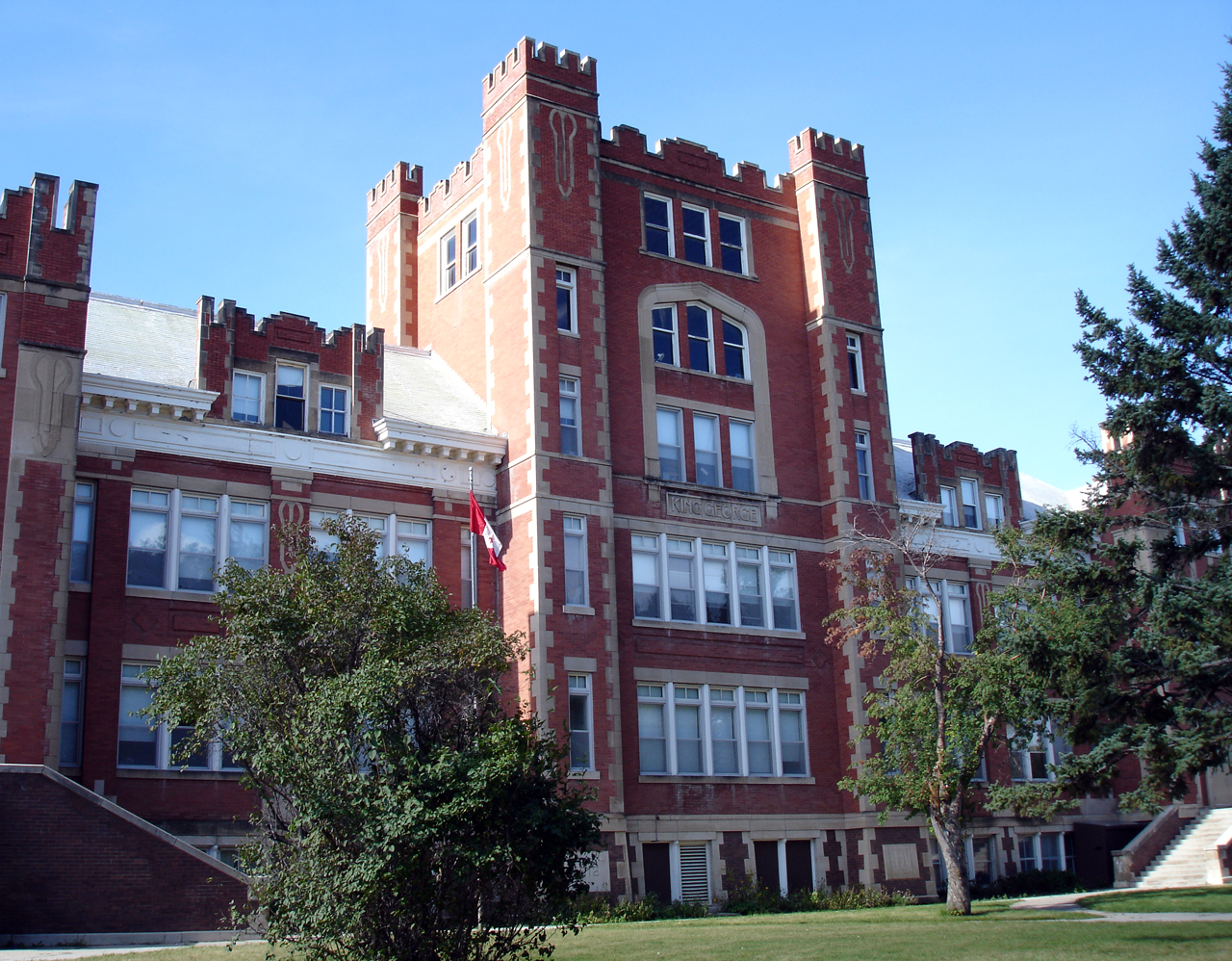
King George School

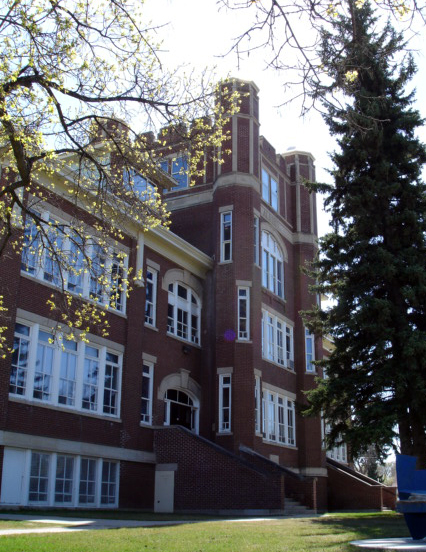
Albert Community Centre

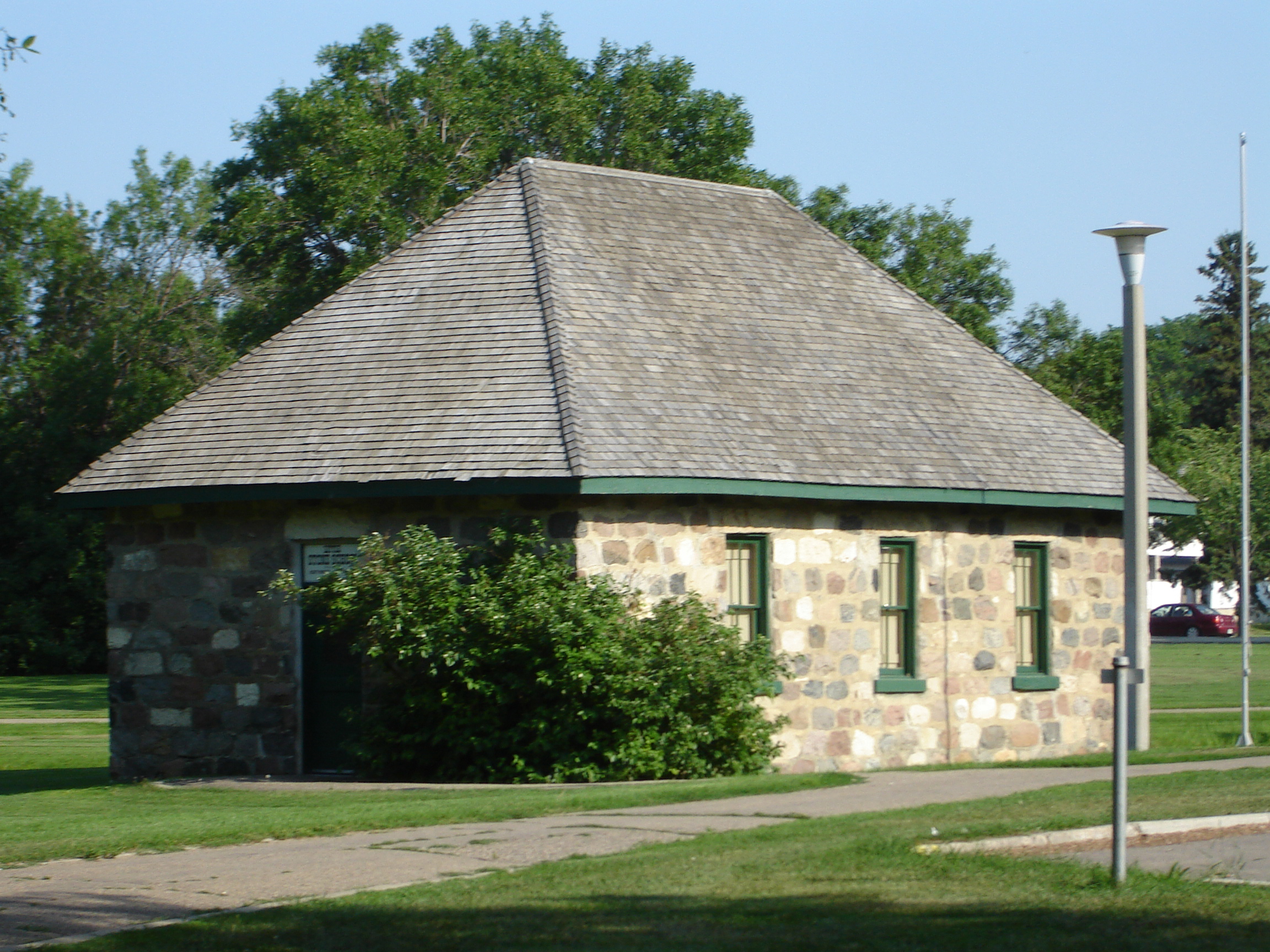
Victoria School House

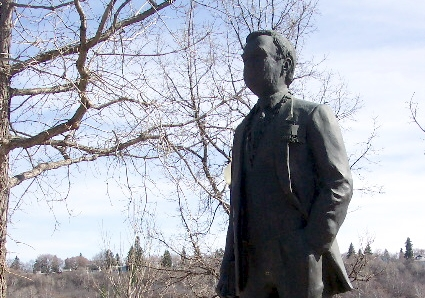
Hnatyshyn Statue

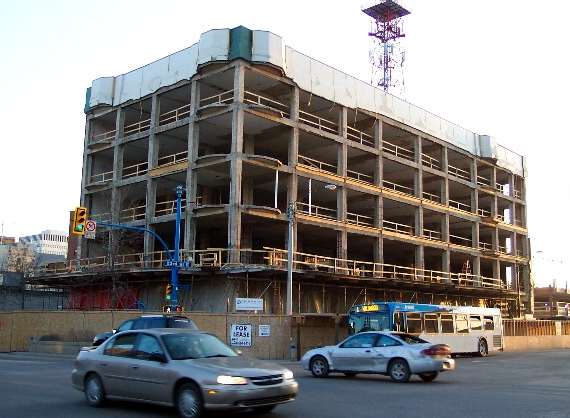
King George Building

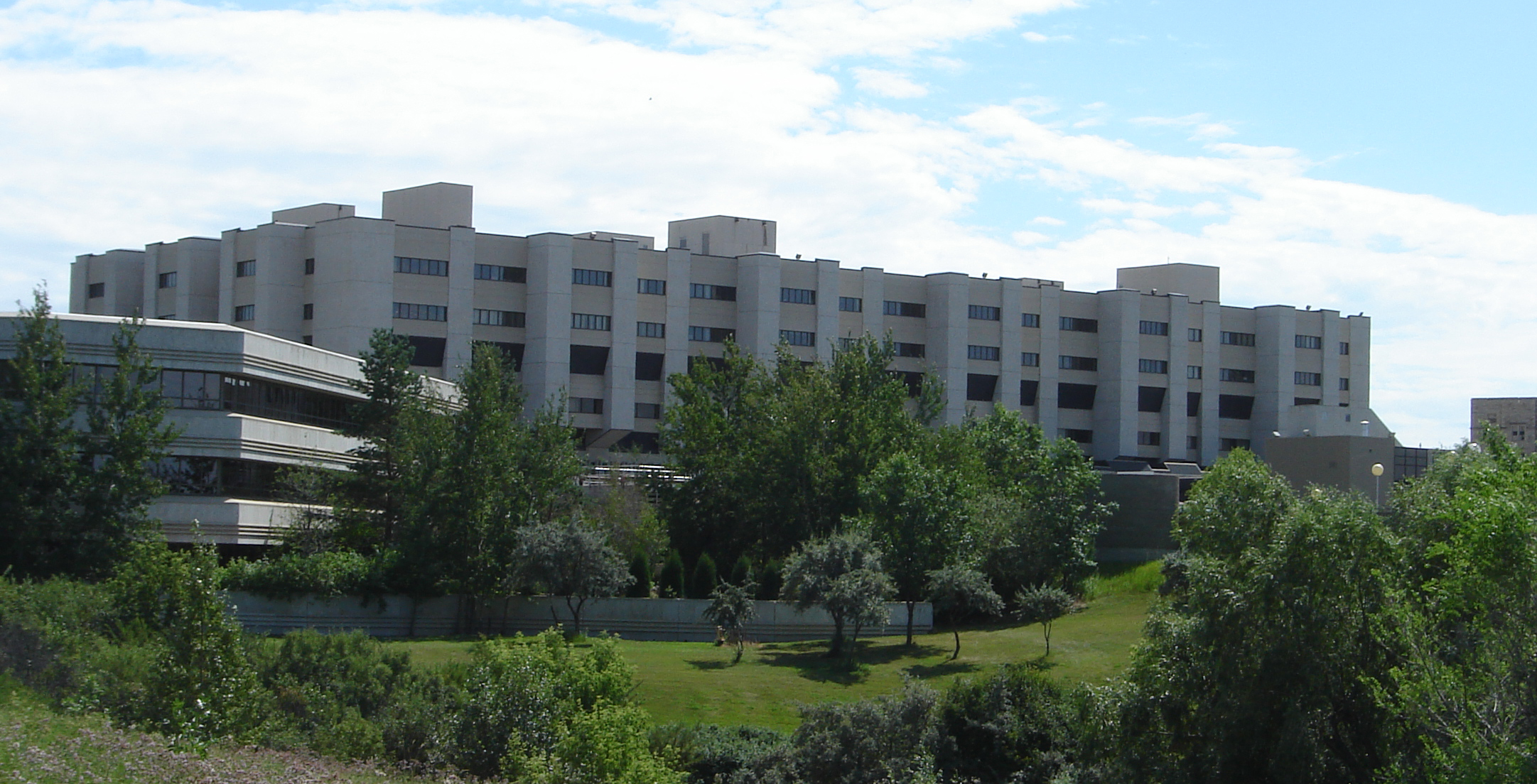
Royal University Hospital

St. John's Cathedral

Patricia Hotel

King Edward Place

== Visits ==
Visits to Canadian communities bring the Sovereign, the Royal Family and vice-regal representatives into direct contact with people from all walks of life. The Government of Saskatchewan maintains that their presence "vividly reminds Canadians of their heritage and political culture as a parliamentary democracy under the Crown ... and it assists the Canadian Crown in its key role of symbolizing and uniting our citizens above the beyond ethnic backgrounds and partisan politics." Though the monarch and her family reside overseas, they have carried out regular ceremonial duties for centuries in Canada on the occasion of important milestones and celebrations. State responsibilities bring them for government-sponsored official visits, while their patronage of organisations brings them for unofficial ones. Invitations and expenses for these visits are usually borne by the organisations. Governors General and Lieutenant Governors, the vice-regal representatives of the monarch, are able to come into more frequent contact with citizens. Saskatoon has been host to more than a dozen royal visits, and home to several vice-regals.

=== Canadian Royal Family ===
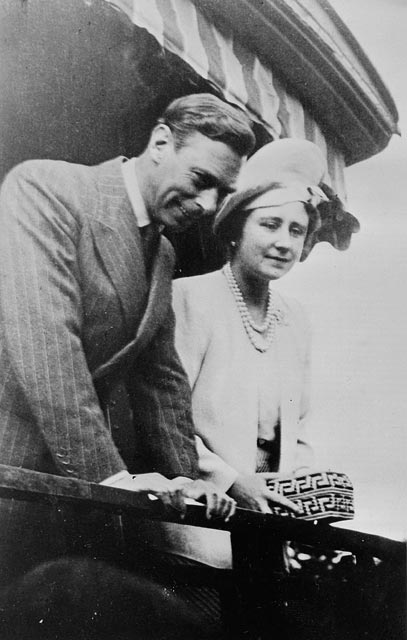
King George VI and Queen Elizabeth paid a visit in 1939, for which more than 100,000 people converged on Saskatoon.

Sovereigns and their consorts who have visited Saskatoon include King Edward VIII as Prince of Wales in 1919, King George VI and Queen Elizabeth in 1939, and Queen Elizabeth II and the Duke of Edinburgh, as Princess Elizabeth in 1951 and afterwards as Queen in 1959, 1978, 1987 and 2005. Other members of the Royal Family who have visited include Princess Margaret, Countess of Snowdon in 1980, Charles, Prince of Wales in 2001, Princess Anne in 1982 and in 2004, Prince Andrew and Sarah, the Duke and Duchess of York in 1989, and the Prince Edward in 1978. On the cross-country tour of King George VI and Queen Elizabeth in 1939, the Saskatoon StarPhoenix reported that "royal weather and a royal crowd greeted Canada's King and Queen in Saskatoon Saturday afternoon. One hundred and fifty thousand persons lost their hearts to the tall, square-shouldered Monarch and his unbelievably gracious consort."

After witnessing the best horsemanship and steer-throwing exhibitions the "Wild West" could produce, the Prince of Wales proved to 20,000 ranchers, cattlemen and cowboys here today that bucking broncos held no terrors for their future King ... At his request a wiry little mustang, untamed and unbroken, was brought out fresh from the paddock, while the huge crowd gasped in surprise. The Prince gained the saddle gracefully, and held it until the little mount was exhausted by its efforts to unseat him.

— The New York Times, 12 September 1919, Saskatoon

Queen Elizabeth II and Prince Philip, Duke of Edinburgh paid several visits to Saskatoon, lastly as part of Saskatchewan centennial celebrations in 2005. The royal couple toured the Canadian Light Source Synchrotron, and there met thousands of well-wishers on the University of Saskatchewan campus, and was later presented with the key to the city. The Queen and the Duke also attended an arts concert at Credit Union Centre, held before a live audience of 12,000 and television viewers nationwide. The Royal Couple were reported to have especially enjoyed the appearance of Saskatoon-native Joni Mitchell, humming along and tapping their heels to her music. The Queen had not visited Saskatoon since 1987, when she toured Wanuskewin Heritage Park, among other engagements with the Duke of Edinburgh.

The Prince of Wales visited Saskatoon for the first time in 2001, when he carried out engagements at its Community Services Village, YWCA and Meewasin Valley trails. At a luncheon given in his honour by Premier Lorne Calvert, the Prince noted that he was "deeply concerned about the problems of inner cities ... our physical surroundings actually matter enormously because they have a profound psychological effect on us." There, he was presented with the gift of a government scholarship for high school students. The Prince dedicated the Prince of Wales Promenade on the river bank, where he was presented with an honorary membership in the Canadian Society of Landscape Architects. To mark the 90th anniversary of the YWCA, the Prince dedicated an arch re-built from the stones of its original building. It is situated outside the entrance off 25th Street, adjacent to the Community Service Village in the downtown core. North of Saskatoon, he also visited Wanuskewin Heritage Park, where he was named Pisimwa Kamiwohkitahpamikohk by an aboriginal elder, which translates to the sun looks at him in a good way.

The Princess Royal is the only living Royal Family member to visit on more than one occasion. On her first visit, she toured the Ukrainian Museum of Canada, attended a civic luncheon and attended a function at the university president's residence, among other campus engagements. She opened the Century Saskatoon Capsule buried in the riverbank at Riverside Park, on the one hundredth anniversary of the settlement of Saskatoon. On her most recent visit in 2004, she became the first member of the Royal Family to present a provincial honour in Canada. The presentation of the Saskatchewan Protective Services Medal to police, fire services, corrections and customs officers, members of the Canadian Forces, and highways and environment personnel, took place in the company of staff, students and invited guests at an inner-city primary school.

In celebration of the 125th anniversary of Confederation and the 100th anniversary of our Ukrainian settlement, the Ukrainian Canadian Congress (Saskatchewan) dedicates this portrait sculpture in honour of His Excellency, the Right Honourable Ramon John Hnatyshyn, twenty-fourth Governor General of Canada, September 12, 1992.

=== Lieutenant Governors ===
Lieutenant Governor Lynda Haverstock at St. Thomas More College, Saskatoon.

Lieutenant Governors are able to make frequent visits to Saskatoon due to closer proximity at Government House in the provincial capital. Visits are normally made at the invitation of organisations, especially those which have been granted vice-regal patronage. Saskatchewan vice-regals are patrons of such organisations as the Saskatoon-based Saskatchewan Craft Council and the Monarchist League of Canada. Events in Saskatoon attended by Lieutenant Governors have included symphony orchestra concerts, celebrity reading week, the International Biology Olympiad, an annual Hindu society dinner and a Ukrainian Canadian Congress awards ceremony. Lieutenant Governors are normally assisted on their engagements by Aides-de-Camp from Saskatoon. Several among the Lieutenant Governors have been residents of Saskatoon, including George Porteous. Porteous, whose state funeral was held in Saskatoon, directed its Community Chest and its Welfare Council, managed a senior citizens housing project, was a member of its public school board and an elder at St. Andrew's Presbyterian Church. Archibald McNab represented the electoral district of Saskatoon City at the provincial legislature before becoming Lieutenant Governor. Stephen Worobetz established a surgical practice, and Hugh E. Monroe established his own medical practice and served as hospital board chairman. Monroe was also one of the first municipal councillors, and member of various local business and leisure clubs. Lynda Haverstock was a member of the Saskatoon Chamber Singers, a group that sang at her installation ceremony as Lieutenant Governor. Lieutenant Governors have also been teachers, governors and students at the University of Saskatchewan in Saskatoon, with Dr. Gordon Barnhart, Lieutenant Governor from 2006 to 2012, becoming acting President of the University as of May 21, 2014.

=== Governors General ===
Governors General make regular visits to Saskatoon, though at greater intervals than their provincial counterparts. Governor General Adrienne Clarkson twice visited, selecting Saskatoon for her urban visits programme through which she sought to dialogue with urban citizens "about innovations and ideas that can be shared with other municipalities to make cities desirable places to live". On this visit, Clarkson hosted a youth roundtable, literary forum and awards presentation, and also met with aboriginal elders. A visit by Roméo LeBlanc included a hospital, senior citizens centre and aboriginal heritage park, another by the Duke of Devonshire included a primary school, and another by the Duke of Connaught included a riverfront cathedral. Former Saskatonian and Governor General Ramon Hnatyshyn was schooled at local grade schools and at the University of Saskatchewan. He is credited with popularising his office on re-opening the vice-regal residence to the public, encouraging artistic development, supporting education and strengthening multiculturalism. Governor General the Earl of Minto visited in 1901, the year Saskatoon was incorporated as a village, and each of his successors have since visited. Their visits include that of Earl Grey in 1906, the Duke and Duchess of Connaught and Princess Patricia in 1912, the Duke of Devonshire in 1917, with the Duchess of Devonshire in 1918, 1919 and 1921, Lord and Lady Byng in 1922 and 1926, the Viscount and Lady Willingdon in 1929, the Earl and Countess of Bessborough in 1932 and 1935, Lord Tweedsmuir in 1938, the Earl of Athlone and Princess Alice, Countess of Athlone in 1941, the Viscount and Lady Alexander in 1946 and 1948, Vincent Massey in 1952 and 1957, Georges and Madame Vanier in 1960 and 1965, Roland Michener in 1968, Jules Léger in 1975, Edward and Mrs. Schreyer in 1979 and 1982, Jeanne Sauvé in 1984, Ramon and Mrs. Hnatyshyn in 1990, Roméo and Mrs. LeBlanc in 1995 and Adrienne Clarkson in 2000 and 2004. Several Governors General are remembered in street, neighbourhood and primary school names, and also in the name of the celebrated Delta Bessborough hotel.

== Arts and culture ==
Saskatoon is home to the Mendel Art Gallery, the Saskatchewan Jazz Festival and the Diefenbaker Museum – and great artists and writers, such as Guy Vanderhaege, David Carpenter and Elizabeth Brewster. Even in this wonderful, modern, cultured city, I think you still see the influence of the landscape, of the sheer physical fact of the prairie, on your artists and thinkers.

— Governor General Adrienne Clarkson, Saskatoon, 2000

Saskatoon artists and artisans also have connections to the Crown. Cyril Leeper, a former portraitist in Saskatoon, was commissioned to paint the portrait of the Queen, and also of the Duke of York on his appointment as commander of HMS Cottesmore. The former portrait was unveiled at Royal Albert Hall in London. Saskatoon-area wood-turning artist Michael Hosaluk's pieces were in Queen Elizabeth II's permanent collection. Painter Robert Hurley (1894–1980) was an English immigrant to Saskatoon well known for his treatment of the prairie landscape. He was largely self-taught in his art, and one of his sketches for a painting was presented to Princess Elizabeth. The work of another Saskatoon painter, Lorenzo Dupuis, was featured in a solo exhibit for the visit of the Duke and Duchess of York there in 1989.

Provincial centennial celebrations in 2005 culminated in an arts gala hosted in Saskatoon by Lieutenant Governor Lynda Haverstock. She said that the event, at which Queen Elizabeth II and the Duke of Edinburgh were present, was a "unique opportunity to experience the rich fabric and diversity of our homegrown artists". It sought to celebrate the achievements of artists, writers, musicians, and entertainers, with special appearances by national and international celebrities including Saskatoon-native Joni Mitchell. Saskatoon-area natives Douglas Bentham, Robert Christie, Gregory Hardy, Michael Hosaluk, Dorothy Knowles and William Perehudoff are members of the Royal Canadian Academy of Arts, an organisation of established professionals working across Canada. Saskatonians have been recognised by national and provincial arts awards, such as the Lieutenant Governor's Award for Lifetime Achievement in the Arts, which are often bestowed by vice-regals.

== Honours ==
The king is the fount of all honours in Canada. The Canadian honours system has developed as a unique entity since the centennial of Canadian Confederation in 1967 when the first distinctly Canadian honour, the Order of Canada was created. Provinces and territories, recognising the Crown's distinct operation in each of their jurisdictions, issue their own orders and medals to honour their citizens for work performed in their province. Saskatchewan established its honours programme in 1985.

Saskatonians have been recipients of many national and provincial honours. The Queen Elizabeth II Golden Jubilee Medal, for example, which commemorated the fiftieth anniversary of the Queen's accession to the throne in 2002, was awarded to nearly 400 residents for their contributions to fellow citizens, their community or to Canada. Similar medals were awarded at the time of the Queen's coronation and silver jubilee. Nearly 100 Saskatonians have been appointed to the Order of Canada, the centrepiece of national honours.

On visiting Saskatoon's King George School in 2004, the Princess Royal presented the Saskatchewan Protective Services Medal to twenty-five recipients from the Royal Canadian Mounted Police and municipal police, fire services, federal and provincial corrections, customs officers, Canadian Forces, and provincial highway transport compliance and environment personnel. It was the first time a member of the Royal Family had presented a provincial honour in Canada. On the occasion, the Princess stated to the audience: "You have chosen to recognize your citizens through honours of the provincial Crown ... a unique opportunity to show our gratitude for the men and women who devote their careers to ensuring our well-being."

== History ==
Queen Elizabeth II Platinum Jubilee Medal (Saskatchewan)

In 1882, Princess Louise, Duchess of Argyll, and her husband, the then Governor General of Canada, were the first members of the Royal Family to pass through what would become Saskatchewan. During a stop at the not yet named territorial capital, in the dining room of the Royal Train, Princess Louise named the new community Regina, after her mother, Queen Victoria.

When Prince Edward Albert (later King Edward VIII) toured Saskatchewan in 1919, he was entertained by the equestrian abilities of the Royal Canadian Mounted Police and bronco busting.

Princess Margaret, Countess of Snowdon, presided over the celebrations of the 75th anniversary of Saskatchewan's entry into Confederation and Princess Anne marked Regina's centennial. Queen Elizabeth II presided over the main events in 2005 celebrating the 100th anniversary of Saskatchewan's creation.

In 2022, Saskatchewan instituted a provincial Platinum Jubilee medal to mark the Queen's seventy years on the Canadian throne; the first time in Canada's history that a royal occasion was commemorated on provincial medals.

== See also ==
- Royal visits to Saskatchewan
- The Canadian Crown in Saskatoon
- University of Saskatchewan > Royal connections
- Symbols of Saskatchewan
- Monarchy

== Sources ==
- MacLeod, Kevin S. (2008). A Crown of Maples (PDF) (1 ed.). Ottawa: Queen's Printer for Canada. p. 16. ISBN 978-0-662-46012-1.
