= Great Seal of Saskatchewan =

Great Seal of Saskatchewan is a seal used to authenticate documents issued by the government of Saskatchewan that are released in the name of the King in Right, including the appointment of the Executive Council and Ministers (the Cabinet).

== History ==
The first seal used was the personal one from the then Lieutenant Governor of Saskatchewan in 1905 until the first official seal was created in 1906. The first seal consisted of the shield from the Coat of arms of Saskatchewan with a border with the words The Great Seal of the Province of Saskatchewan. The current seal created in 1991 replace the shield with the full coat of arms. The border wording was changed to include the words Queen Elizabeth II - Queen of Canada.

== See also ==
- Symbols of Saskatchewan
