= Commemorative Medal for the Centennial of Saskatchewan =

Commemorative medal of the Canadian province of Saskatchewan

- Obverse of the medal
- Type: Commemorative medal
- Awarded for: Contributions to the community and to the province through leadership, voluntarism, community involvement and outstanding personal achievements
- Presented by: The lieutenant governor of Saskatchewan
- Eligibility: Residents of Saskatchewan
- Established: 27 May 2005

Highlights
- Total: 4,200
- Ribbon bar of the medal

Precedence
- Next (higher): British Columbia Fire Services Long Service and Bravery Medals
- Next (lower): Alberta Centennial Medal

The Commemorative Medal for the Centennial of Saskatchewan, also called the Saskatchewan Centennial Medal, is a commemorative medal struck to celebrate the first 100 years since Saskatchewan's entrance into Canadian Confederation.

The medal recognizes individuals who have made significant contributions to society and honours outstanding achievements. Approximately 4,200 medals were produced.

== Criteria ==
Criteria for this medal were a broad range of contributions to the community and to the province through leadership, voluntarism, community involvement and outstanding personal achievements. Only individuals (not groups) could be nominated and posthumous nominations were not accepted.

A certain number of individuals received the medal by virtue of their office, such as provincial and federal elected members, judges, aboriginal leaders, and community and municipal leaders. Other recipients were selected based on the recommendation of governmental and non-governmental organizations and Members of the Legislative Assembly.

== Design ==
The medal displays the provincial motto under a wreath of western red lilies, surmounted by the St. Edward's Crown. The words "Saskatchewan 1905–2005" are around the medal's circumference. The provincial shield of arms is on the reverse of the medal, which is suspended from a gold-colored ribbon with two narrow diagonal green stripes.

== See also ==
- Monarchy in Saskatchewan
- Orders, decorations, and medals of Canada
- List of Canadian awards
