= Symbols of Saskatchewan =

Symbols of Canadian province

Saskatchewan is one of Canada's provinces, and has established several provincial symbols.

== Symbols ==
	Symbol	Image	Adopted	Remarks
Coat of arms	Coat of arms of Saskatchewan		September 16, 1986	Granted by royal proclamation of Queen Elizabeth II.
Shield of arms	Shield of Saskatchewan	Shield of Arms of Saskatchewan	August 25, 1906	Shield of arms granted by the Royal Warrant of King Edward VII.
Provincial symbol	Saskatchewan's Wheat Sheaf		1977	Used to identify government programs and organizations.
Flag	Flag of Saskatchewan	Flag of Saskatchewan	1969	Green for northern forests, gold for southern grain fields.
The Great Seal	The Great Seal of Saskatchewan		May 7, 1991	First Great Seal of Saskatchewan granted by royal warrant of King Edward VII on August 25, 1906, The Great Seal of Saskatchewan of 1991 was authorized by an Order-in-Council.
Flower	Western red lily Lilium philadelphicum var. andinum	Flower: Western red lily	1941	It is a protected species.
Bird	Sharp-tailed Grouse; Pedioectes phasianellus jamesi	Bird: Sharp-tailed Grouse	1945	The Sharp-tailed Grouse lives year-round in Saskatchewan.
Tree	Paper Birch; Betula papyrifera	Tree: Paper Birch	1988	Used as firewood, for plywood, and for construction of canoes.
Mineral	Potash	Mineral: Potash	February 1996	Was given official status by amendments to The Provincial Emblems and Honours Act in May 1997.
Animal	White-tailed deer Odocoileus virginianus	Animal: White-tailed Deer	2001	First appeared on Saskatchewan's coat of arms in 1986.
Grass	Needle-and-thread grass Hesperostipa comata	Grass: Needle-and-thread grass	2001	It was selected by a coalition of environmental, wildlife and agricultural organizations.
Fruit	Saskatoon Berry; Amelanchier alnifolia	Fruit: Saskatoon berry	2005	
Fish	Walleye; Sander vitreus	Fish: Walleye	2005	
Flag	Fransaskois Flag	Fransaskois Flag	2005	The gold color represents the wheat fields of Saskatchewan, the cross is for the Catholic Church in Fransaskois, and the green color is for northern forests. The red fleur de lis symbolizes "la Francophonie".
Sport	Curling	Curling rock	2001	A well known sport in Saskatchewan since the 1880s.
Tartan	District Tartan	The provincial tartan	1961	The provincial tartan was registered with the Court of Lord Lyon King of Arms in Scotland.
Tartan	Dress Tartan		1997	Saskatchewan dress tartan was introduced for competitive highland dancers on the occasion of the Canadian Interprovincial Highland Dancing Championships. The original provincial tartan, with the off-white line becoming the background colour of the dress version.
