= Anthony Drake =

English school teacher and designer of Saskatchewan flag (1941–2022)

- Born: 1941; England
- Died: 1 June 2022 (age 81); England
- Notable work: Design of the Saskatchewan flag (adopted in 1969)
- Spouse: Joan Drake

Saskatchewan
- The Flag of Saskatchewan adopted on 22 September 1969

Anthony Drake (1941 – 1 June 2022) was an English high school teacher who designed the provincial flag of Saskatchewan in 1968.

The flag was adopted on 22 September 1969, but by then, Drake and his wife had already returned to England and therefore never had the opportunity to see his creation fly in the province until 2016 when he and his wife visited Canada for a tour of Saskatchewan.

== Early life ==
Drake's family emigrated from England to Preston, Ontario when he was still a boy. He became lonely and after finishing high school, he moved back to England. He studied at a Teachers Training College and qualified as a teacher. He also married his fiancée, Joan.

== Career ==
Drake saw an advertisement for a teaching post in Saskatchewan, Canada and sent in an application. Upon securing the post, he and his wife, Joan moved from East Yorkshire, England to Hodgeville, Saskatchewan. In 1968, while working as a teacher in Hodgeville High School, he came across a post in the newspaper about a new Saskatchewan provincial flag design competition for a cash prize worth $1,000 and decided to try his luck. He submitted 13 designsand before the result of the contest was announced, he learned that his wife was expecting their first child. He and his wife moved back to East Yorkshire, England in 1969 so their family could meet their daughter.

Over 4,000 flag designs were received by the province and unbeknown to him, one of his designs was selected and he won the $1,000 cash prize. The Saskatchewan Government officially unveiled his flag and ran it up a flagpole in the autumn of 1969.

He didn't see his flag until 2016. when he and his wife visited Canada for a tour of Saskatchewan and to celebrate the 47th anniversary of the adoption of his flag. While there, they met dignitaries, Hodgeville students and many others.

He and his wife returned to Saskatchewan for the last time in 2019 for a VIP tour of the province to celebrate the 50th anniversary of the adoption of the Saskatchewan flag.

== Death ==
Drake died in England on 1 June 2022.
