= Flag of Saskatchewan =

Canadian provincial flag

Saskatchewan
- Use: Civil and state flag
- Proportion: 1:2
- Adopted: 22 September 1969; 57 years ago
- Designed by: Anthony Drake

The provincial flag of Saskatchewan was adopted in 1969. Its upper half is green and contains the coat of arms of Saskatchewan, and its lower half is yellow. In the fly of the flag is a western red lily, the provincial flower. In 2017, The Minister of Parks, Culture and Sports designated 22 September as Saskatchewan Flag Day.

== Design ==
The flag is blazoned: Per fess vert and or, in the fly a prairie lily slipped and leaved proper, in the dexter chief an escutcheon of the coat of arms of Saskatchewan fimbriated argent.

The green upper half represents the province's forested north, while the yellow represents the grain fields found in the south. The red prairie lily is the provincial flower of Saskatchewan.

== History ==
The flag of Saskatchewan was adopted on 22 September 1969, the result of a province-wide competition that drew over 4,000 entries. The winning entry was one of the 13 designed by Anthony Drake of Hodgeville, Saskatchewan. Drake came and left Saskatchewan from the United Kingdom and did not have an opportunity to see his winning design fly until returning to Hodgeville. Saskatchewan politician Percy Schmeiser was on the flag committee in 1969 during his time as member of the Legislative Assembly and was at the inaugural flag raising ceremony, unlike Anthony Drake. The two finally met when Drake returned in 2019.

== Other flags ==
=== Fransaskois flag ===
Flag of the Fransaskois

This flag used to represent the heritage of the French speakers of Saskatchewan and is blazoned Or a cross enhanced throughout vert, its vertical beam to the hoist, in the fly a fleur-de-lis gules its traverse vert.

The symbolism within the Fransaskois flag is mostly the same as the provincial flag with the yellow and green representing the wheat and the forests respectively. However, with the addition of the cross alluding to the role that the Catholic Church and the many missionaries had in settling what is now the province of Saskatchewan and the fleur-de-lis which represents the Francophone population globally; it is coloured red to show the fighting courage in the battle of preserving the rights of their culture and language; it makes the flag distinguishable enough to stand out on its own.

=== Flag of the lieutenant governor ===
Flag of the lieutenant governor

The lieutenant governor of Saskatchewan is a viceregal representative of the monarch of Canada and thus has their own flag. It has precedence over any other flag except the sovereign's flag for Canada and the flag of the governor general of Canada, unless the governor general is a guest of the lieutenant governor. This flag is flown at the home and office of the lieutenant governor as well as any buildings that may conduct official duties.

It is blazoned Azure the shield of Arms of the Province of Saskatchewan ensigned with the Royal Crown proper and encircled by a wreath of maple leaves Or.

== Gallery ==
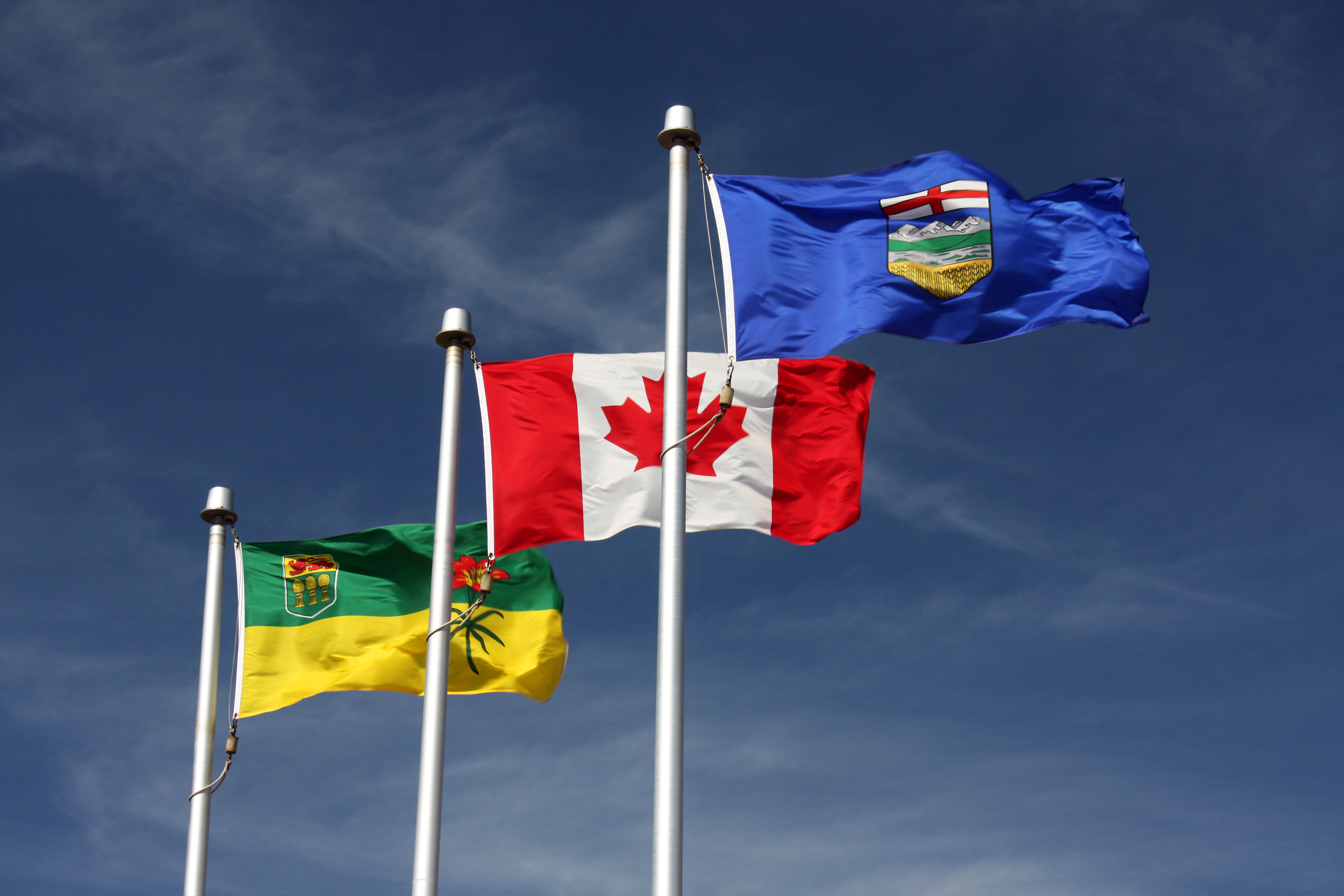
The flag of Saskatchewan flying alongside the flags of Canada and Alberta in Lloydminster

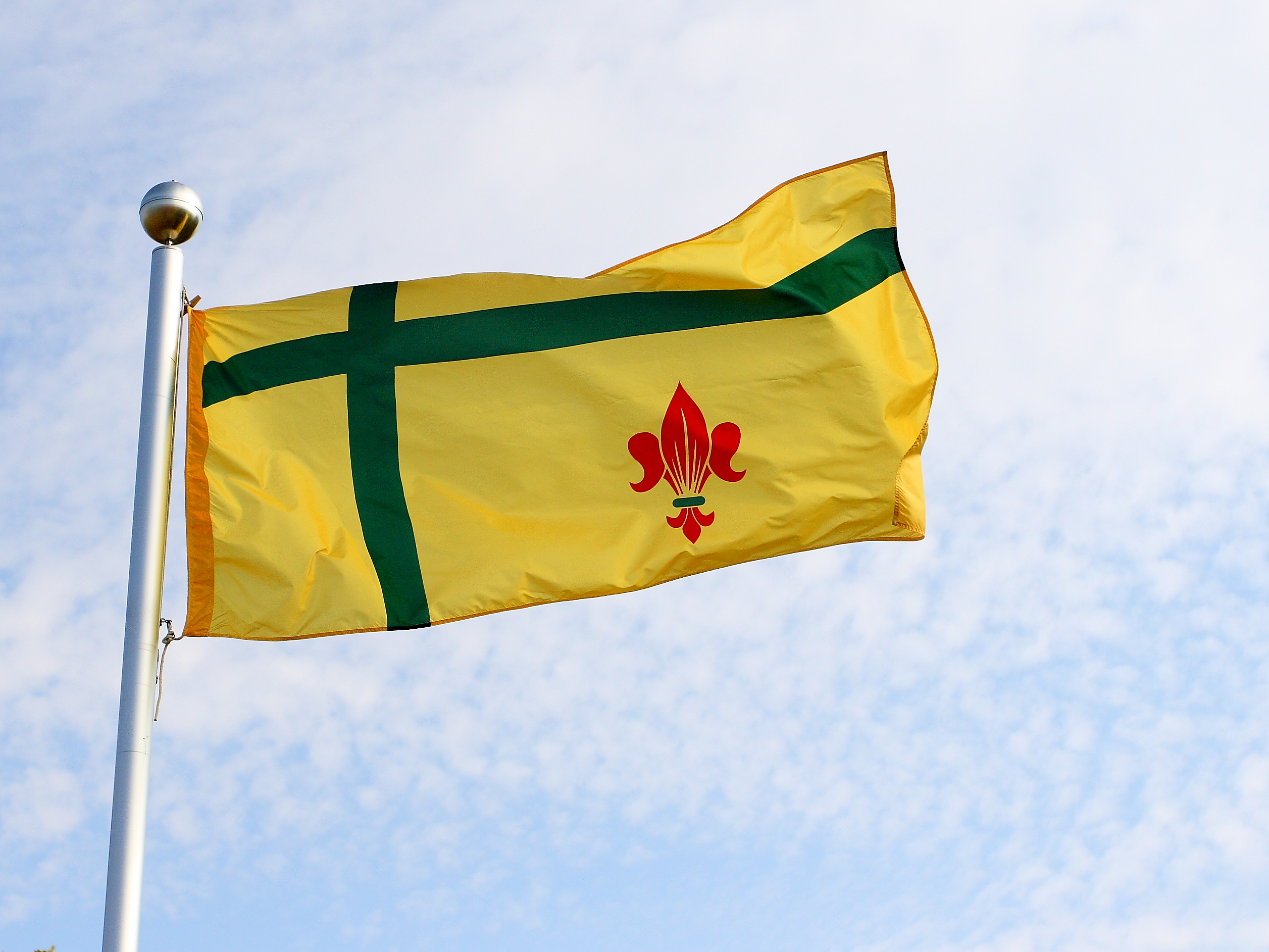
Flag of the Fransaskois

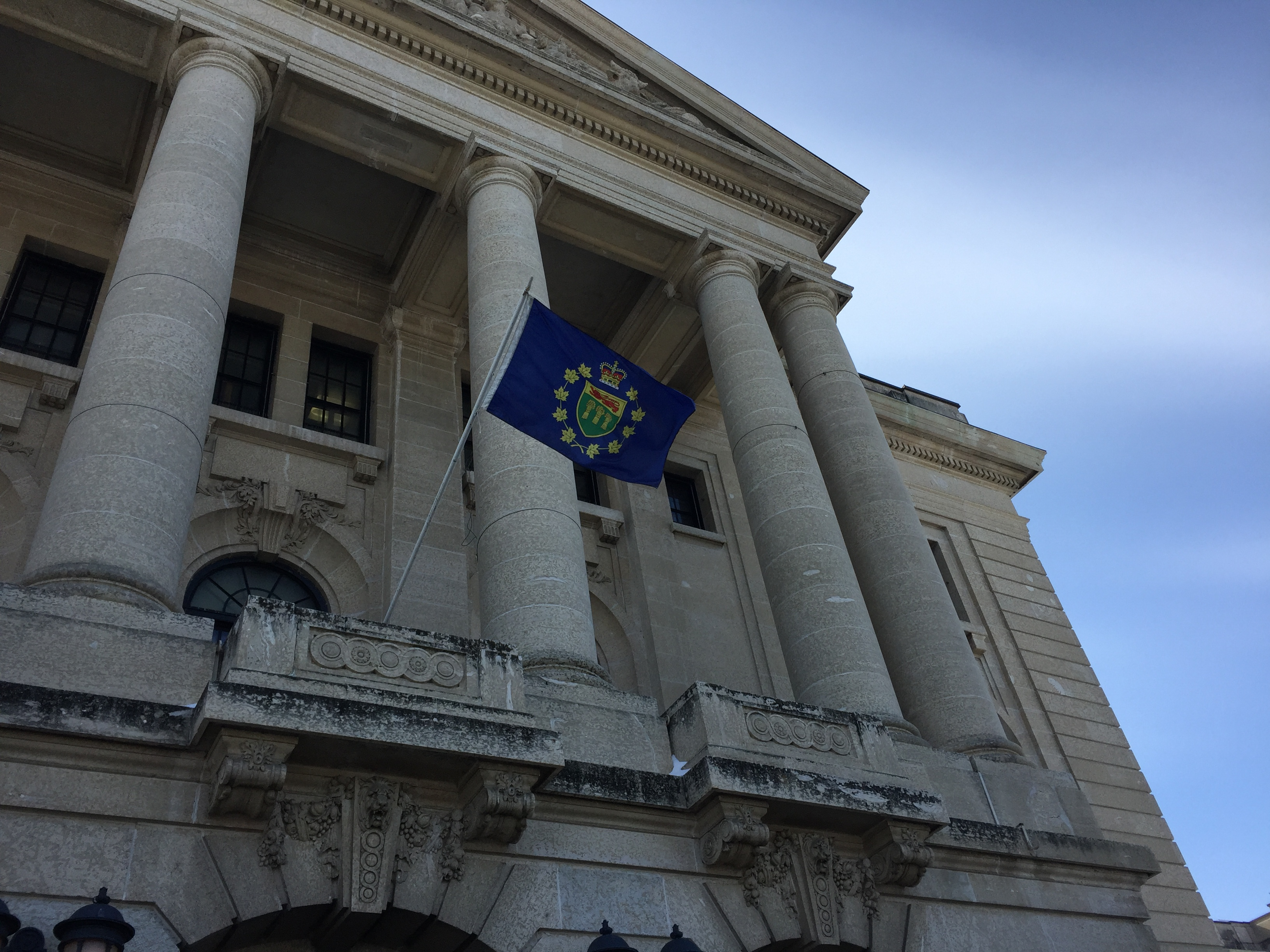
The Vice Regal Standard over the Saskatchewan Legislative Building at the installation of W. Thomas Molloy

Flag of the lieutenant-governor of Saskatchewan (1906–1981)

== See also ==
- List of Canadian provincial and territorial symbols
- Symbols of Saskatchewan
