= List of royal visits to Saskatchewan =

Saskatchewan, a Canadian province, has received numerous royal visits since 1901. The current Canadian monarch has visited Saskatchewan six times. Other members of the Canadian Royal Family have also paid visits.

== List of royal visits ==
Date	Visitor(s)	Communities	Highlights
September 1901	The Duke and Duchess of Cornwall and York	Moose Jaw	
October 1901	The Duke and Duchess of Cornwall and York	Qu'Appelle, Regina	
April 1906	Prince Arthur, The Duke of Connaught	Regina	
October 1912	The Duke and Duchess of Connaught and Princess Patricia	Moose Jaw, Regina	
July 1916	The Duke and Duchess of Connaught and Princess Patricia	Regina	
September 1919	The Prince of Wales	Saskatoon	Outdoor city park pavilion
October 1919	The Prince of Wales	Maple Creek, Gull Lake, Swift Current (whistle stops), Regina, Qu'Appelle Valley	
August 1927	The Prince of Wales and Prince George	Moose Jaw, Regina	
May–June 1939	King George VI and Queen Elizabeth	Moose Jaw, Regina, Saskatoon, Train stops	University of Saskatchewan
April 1941	Princess Alice and The Earl of Athlone	Moose Jaw, Regina, Small rural communities	
August 1941	Princess Alice and The Earl of Athlone	Moose Jaw, Regina, Small rural communities	
June 1944	Princess Alice The Earl of Athlone	Moose Jaw, Small rural communities	
October 1951	Princess Elizabeth and the Duke of Edinburgh	Moose Jaw, Regina, Saskatoon, Swift Current	
July 1958	Princess Margaret	Prince Albert, Waskesiu Lake	
July 1959	Queen Elizabeth II and the Duke of Edinburgh	Moose Jaw, Regina, Saskatoon, Train stops at Broadview, Chamberlain, Hanley, Indian Head, Moosomin	Western Development Museum
April 1966	Lord Louis Mountbatten	Regina	
June 1967	Princess Alexandra and The Honourable Angus Ogilvy	Regina	
July 1973	Queen Elizabeth II and The Duke of Edinburgh	Regina	
November 1977	The Duke of Edinburgh	Regina	
July 1978	Queen Elizabeth II, the Duke of Edinburgh and Prince Edward	Balcarres, Cory Potash Mine, Fort Qu'Appelle, Lloydminster, Melville, Moose Jaw, Regina, Saskatoon, Yorkton	
July 1980	Princess Margaret	The Battlefords, Muskoday First Nation, Prince Albert, Saskatoon, Tisdale, Zenon Park	
July 1982	Princess Anne	Alameda, Gravelbourg, Estevan, Moosomin, Qu'Appelle Valley, Regina, Saskatoon, Wilcox	
July 1985	The Queen Mother	Regina	
June 1987	The Duke of Edinburgh	Last Mountain Lake, Regina, Farm near Kronau	
October 1987	Queen Elizabeth II and the Duke of Edinburgh	Canora, Kamsack, Kindersley, Regina, Saskatoon, Farm near Flaxcombe	Wanuskewin archaeological site
July 1989	The Duke and Duchess of York	Arrowhead Island on Lac la Ronge, La Ronge, Meadow Lake, Nipawin, Prince Albert, Regina, Saskatoon, Stanley Mission, Swift Current	Canada Summer Games
August 1994	Prince Edward	Fort Qu'Appelle, Echo Lake, Regina, Standing Buffalo First Nation	
April 2001	The Prince of Wales	Assiniboia, Moose Jaw, Regina, Saskatoon	Community Service Village, Wanuskewin Heritage Park, Meewasin Valley Weir (Itinerary)
June 2003	The Earl of Wessex	Lloydminster, Melfort, Moose Jaw, Prince Albert, Regina	
June 2004	The Princess Royal	The Battlefords, Regina, Saskatoon	King George School (Itinerary)
May 2005	Queen Elizabeth II and the Duke of Edinburgh	Lumsden, Regina, Saskatoon	Canadian Light Source Synchrotron, Credit Union Centre (Itinerary)
June 2006	The Earl of Wessex	Moose Jaw	Saskatchewan Order of Merit
June 2007	The Princess Royal	Regina, Saltcoats, Yorkton	Royal Regina Rifles, Freedom of the City Parade
May 2012	The Prince of Wales	Regina	
September 2014	The Earl of Wessex	Moose Jaw, Regina, Saskatoon, Swift Current	
June 2016	The Earl and Countess of Wessex	Regina	
