= Coat of arms of Saskatchewan =

Canadian provincial heraldic symbol

Arms of His Majesty The King in Right of Saskatchewan
- Armiger: Charles III in Right of Saskatchewan
- Adopted: 25 August 1906
- Crest: Beaver upholding with its back Royal Crown and holding in the fore-claws a Western Red Lily
- Shield: Vert, three garbs Or in fess, on a chief of the second a lion passant guardant Gules
- Supporters: Royal lion and an indigenous white-tailed deer
- Compartment: Garland of red lilies
- Motto: Multis e gentibus vires from many peoples strength

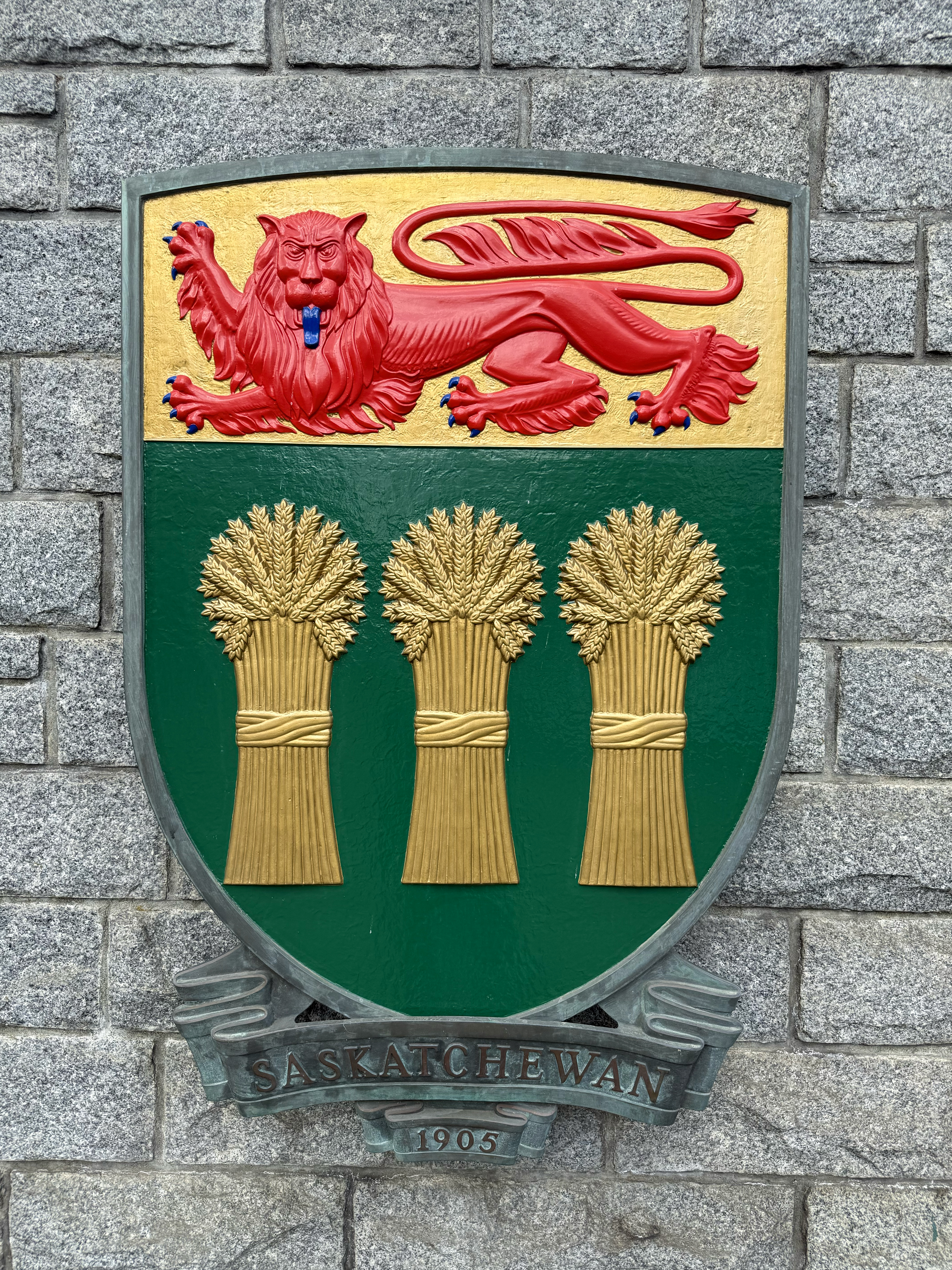
Shield of Saskatchewan

The coat of arms of Saskatchewan, officially known as His Majesty's Arms in Right of Saskatchewan, is the heraldic symbol representing the Canadian province of Saskatchewan.

The arms, consisting of only the shield, was assigned by royal warrant of King Edward VII on 25 August 1906. It uses the provincial colours, green and gold. The remainder of the coat of arms was requested by the province in 1985, Saskatchewan Heritage Year, and was granted by royal proclamation of Queen Elizabeth II on 16 September 1986.

== Symbolism ==
On the gold chief is a lion passant or leopard, a royal symbol of England. (English lions are usually gold with blue tongues and claws; however, the default colours for a heraldic lion on a gold field are red with blue tongue and claws.) The three gold sheaves of wheat, or garbs, represent the province's agriculture; the heraldic sheaf of wheat has become a generalized symbol of the province.

The helmet above the shield is gold and faces left, a symbol of Saskatchewan's co-sovereign status in Confederation. The mantling is in the national colours of Canada. The crest is a beaver, Canada's national animal, holding a western red lily, Saskatchewan's provincial flower. The crest is surmounted by a crown, representing royal sovereignty.

Both supporters – a royal lion to the left, and an indigenous white-tailed deer to the right – are wearing collars of First Nations beadwork, from which are suspended badges in the same six-pointed shape as the insignia of the Saskatchewan Order of Merit. The lion's badge is emblazoned with a maple leaf and the deer's, with a red lily. The supporters stand on a compartment of red lilies.

The motto is multis e gentibus vires: from many peoples, strength.

== Blazon ==
The original royal warrant of 1906 blazoned the shield as follows:

Vert three Garbs in fesse Or, on a Chief of the last a Lion passant guardant Gules.

The royal proclamation of 1986 blazoned the augmentations as follows:

For the crest: Upon a Helm with a Wreath Argent and Gules a Beaver upholding with its back Our Royal Crown and holding in the dexter fore-claws a Western Red Lily (Lilium philadelphicum andinum) slipped all proper Mantled Gules doubled Argent.

For the supporters: On the dexter side a Lion Or gorged with a Collar of Prairie Indian beadwork proper and dependent therefrom a six-pointed Mullet faceted Argent fimbriated and garnished Or charged with a Maple leaf Gules and on the sinister side a White tailed deer (Odocoileus virginianus) proper gorged with a like Collar and dependent therefrom a like Mullet charged with a Western Red Lily slipped and leaved proper.

For the motto: Beneath the Shield a Scroll entwined with Western Red Lilies slipped and leaved proper inscribed with the Motto Multis e gentibus vires.

== Gallery ==
Escutcheon granted by Edward VII in 1906

Badge for use by the Lieutenant Governor of Saskatchewan

Crest of Saskatchewan granted by Elizabeth II in the 1986 augmentation

The Great Seal of Saskatchewan in the reign of Elizabeth II

== See also ==
- Flag of Saskatchewan
- Symbols of Saskatchewan
- Monarchy in Saskatchewan
- List of Canadian provincial and territorial symbols
- Heraldry
