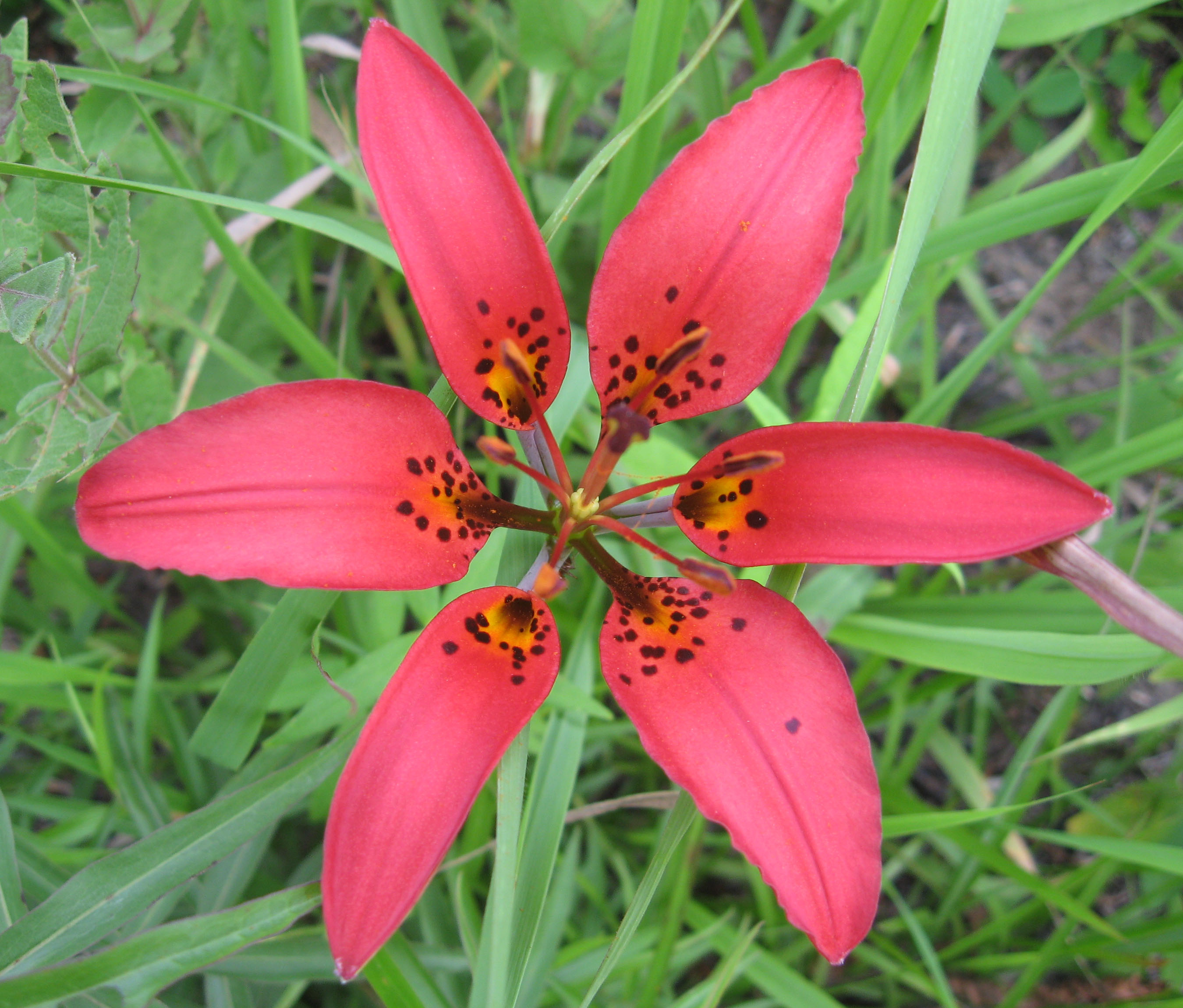

Conservation status
- Secure (NatureServe)

Scientific classification
- Kingdom: Plantae
- Clade: Tracheophytes
- Clade: Angiosperms
- Clade: Monocots
- Order: Liliales
- Family: Liliaceae
- Subfamily: Lilioideae
- Genus: Lilium
- Species: L. philadelphicum

Binomial name
- Lilium philadelphicum L.

Synonyms
- Lilium andinum Nutt.; Lilium lanceolatum T.J.Fitzp.; Lilium masseyi Hyams; Lilium montanum A.Nelson; Lilium umbellatum Pursh; Lilium wansharicum Duch.

= Lilium philadelphicum =

Species of lily

Lilium philadelphicum, also known as the wood lily, flame lily, Philadelphia lily, (wild) tiger lily, prairie lily, or western red lily, is a perennial species of lily native to North America.

== Distribution ==
The plant is widely distributed in much of Canada from British Columbia to Quebec, and parts of the United States (Northeast and Great Lakes regions plus the Rocky and Appalachian Mountains).

== Description ==
Lilium philadelphicum grows to a height of approximately 30 to 90 centimeters. It produces red or orange blooms between June and August.

=== Varieties ===
- Lilium philadelphicum var. andinum—western wood lily, native to Midwestern U.S., Great Plains, and Western U.S. regions. It is the floral emblem of the province of Saskatchewan in Canada, and is on the flag of Saskatchewan.

== Conservation ==
Lilium philadelphicum is listed as an endangered species in Maryland, New Mexico, Tennessee, North Carolina and Ohio. Its status is a threatened species in Kentucky.

As the Saskatchewan provincial floral emblem, it is protected under the Provincial Emblems and Honours Act, and cannot be picked, uprooted or destroyed in any manner.

== Toxicity ==
Cats are extremely sensitive to lily toxicity and ingestion is often fatal. Households and gardens that are visited by cats are strongly advised against keeping this plant or placing dried flowers where a cat may brush against them and become dusted with pollen that they then consume while cleaning. Suspected cases require urgent veterinary attention.

Rapid treatment with activated charcoal and/or induced vomiting can reduce the amount of toxin absorbed (this is time-sensitive so in some cases, vets may advise doing it at home), and large amounts of fluid by intravenous injection can reduce damage to kidneys to increase the chances of survival.

== Traditional uses ==
The bulbs were eaten by some Native Americans.

== Gallery ==
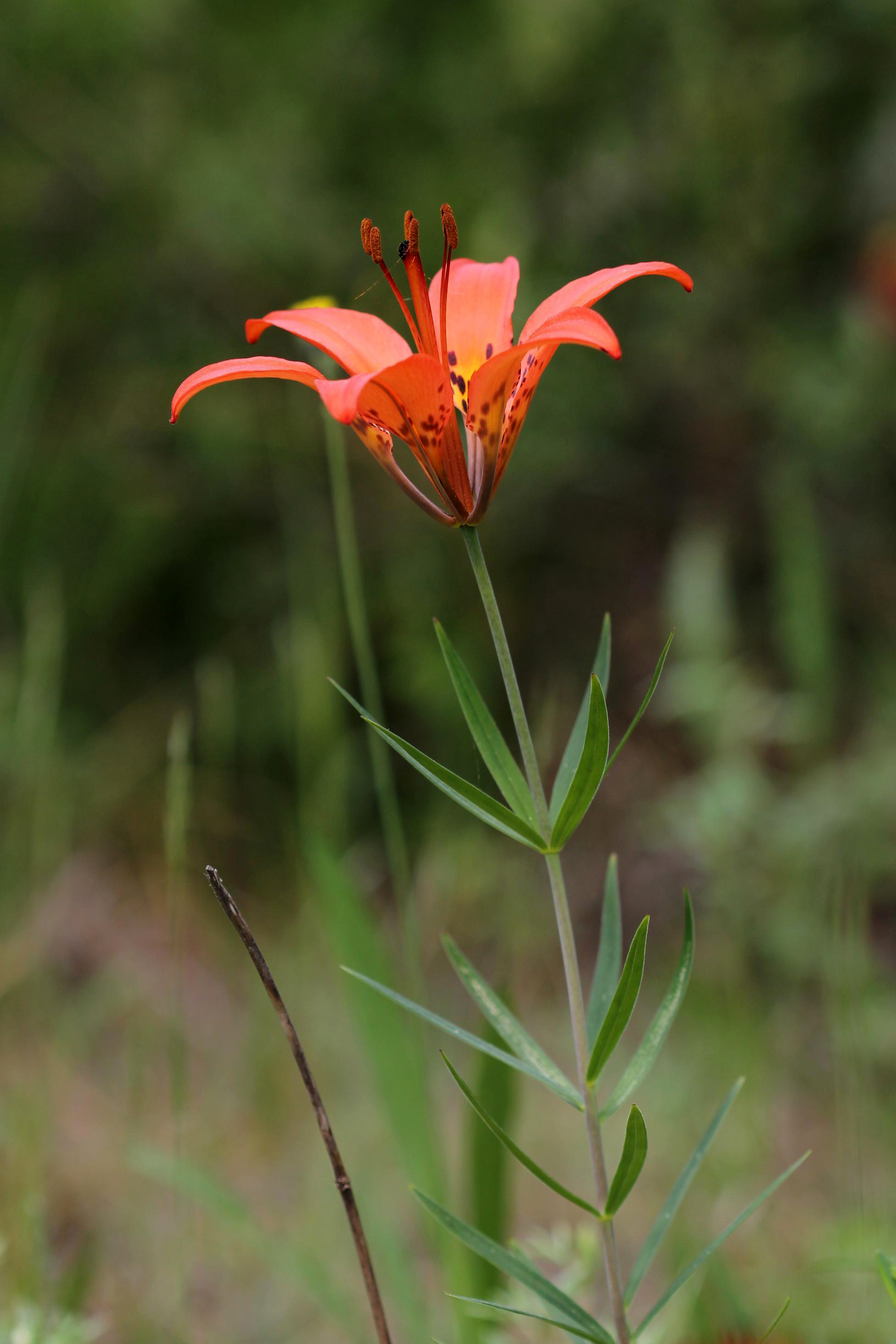
Flower with foliage

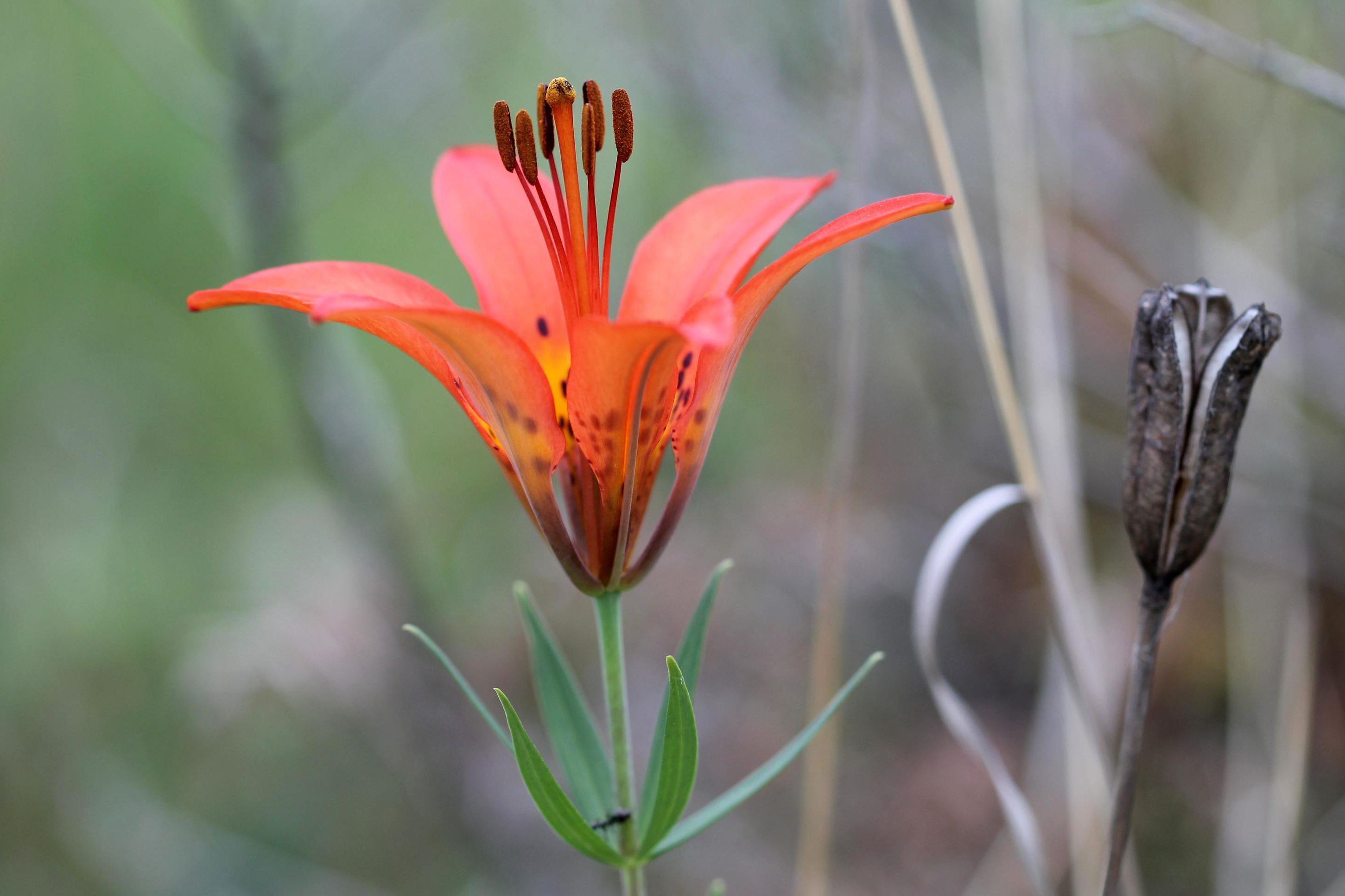
Side view of flower

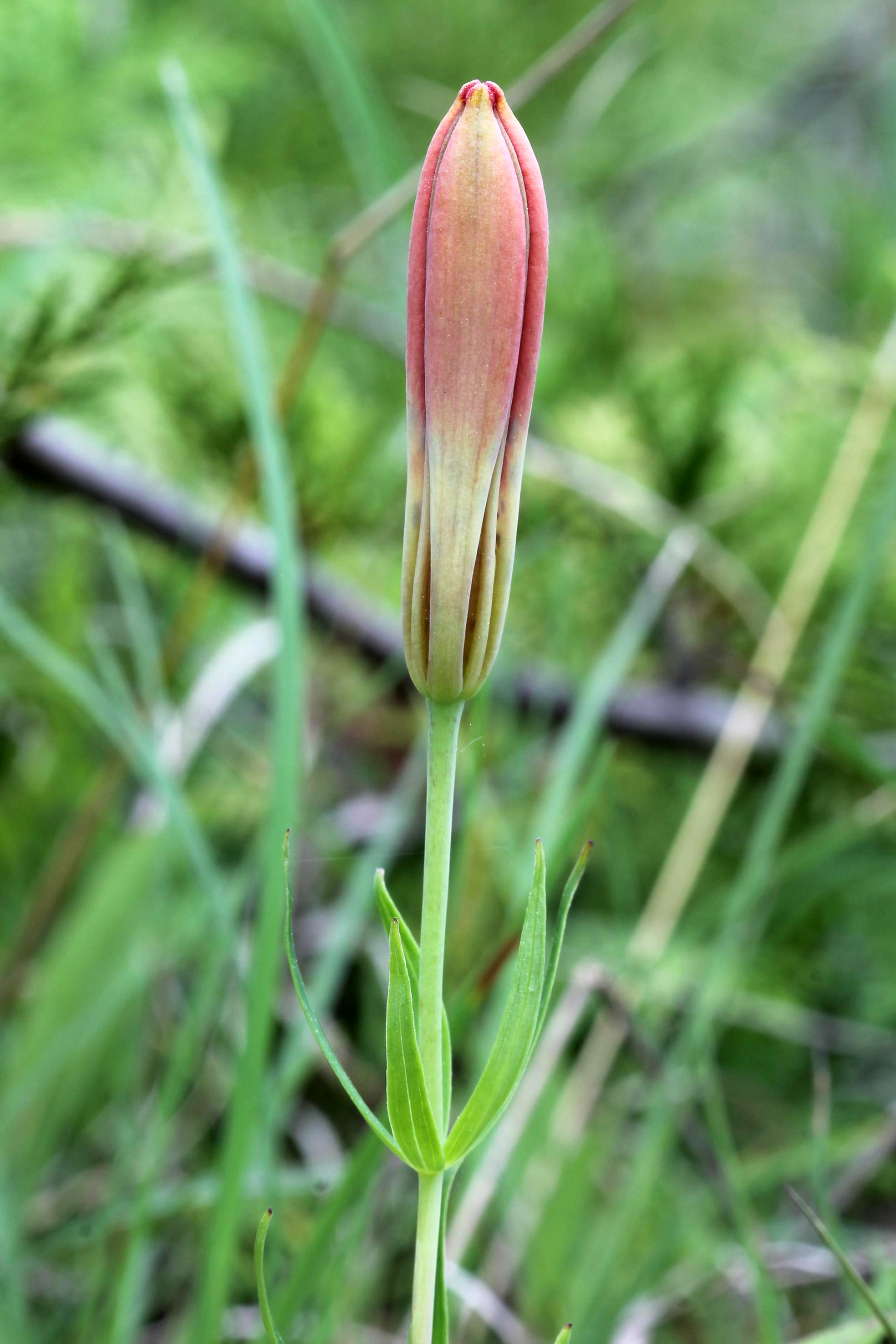
Immature flower

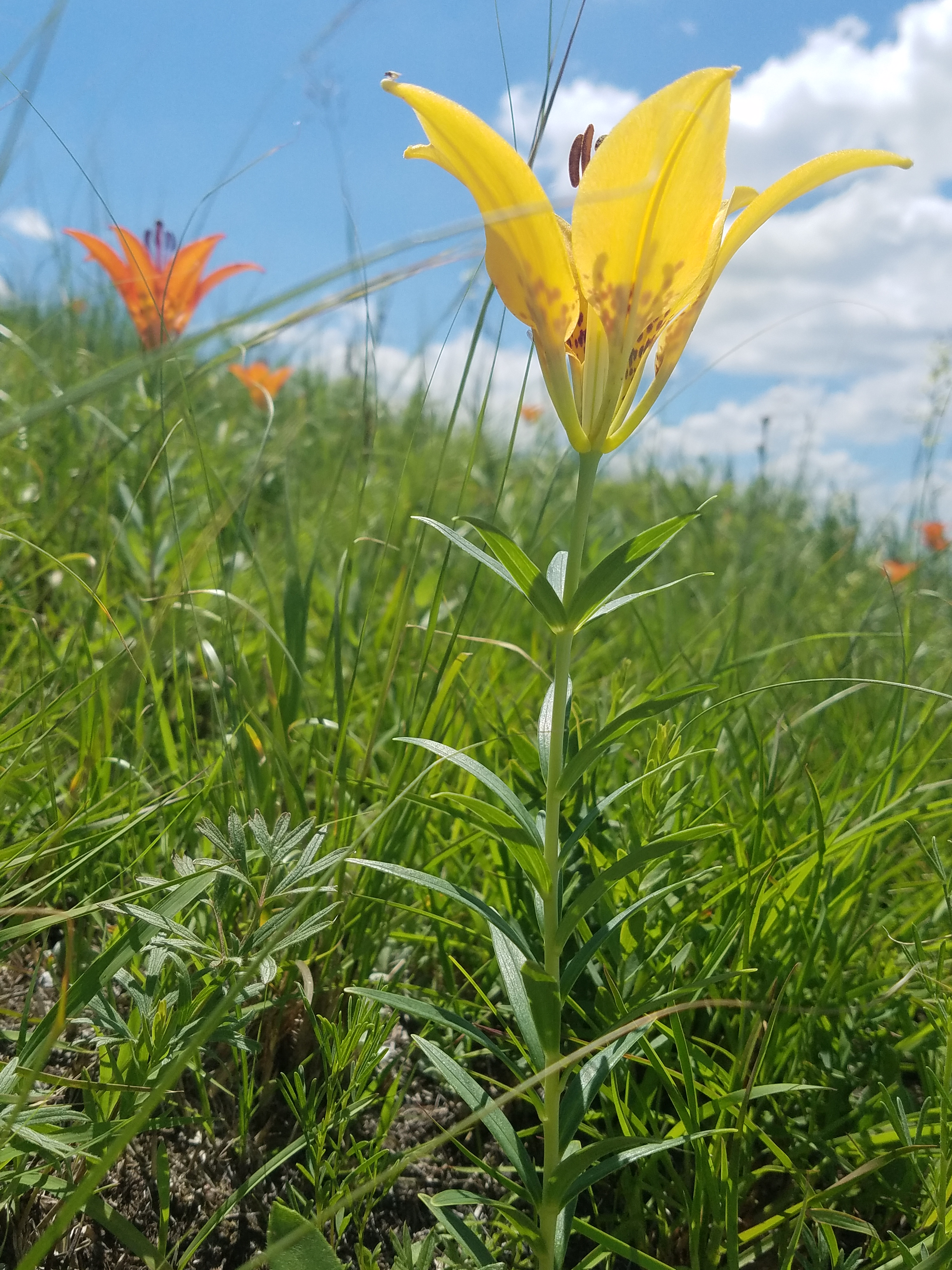
Rare yellow form in Logan County, North Dakota, USA

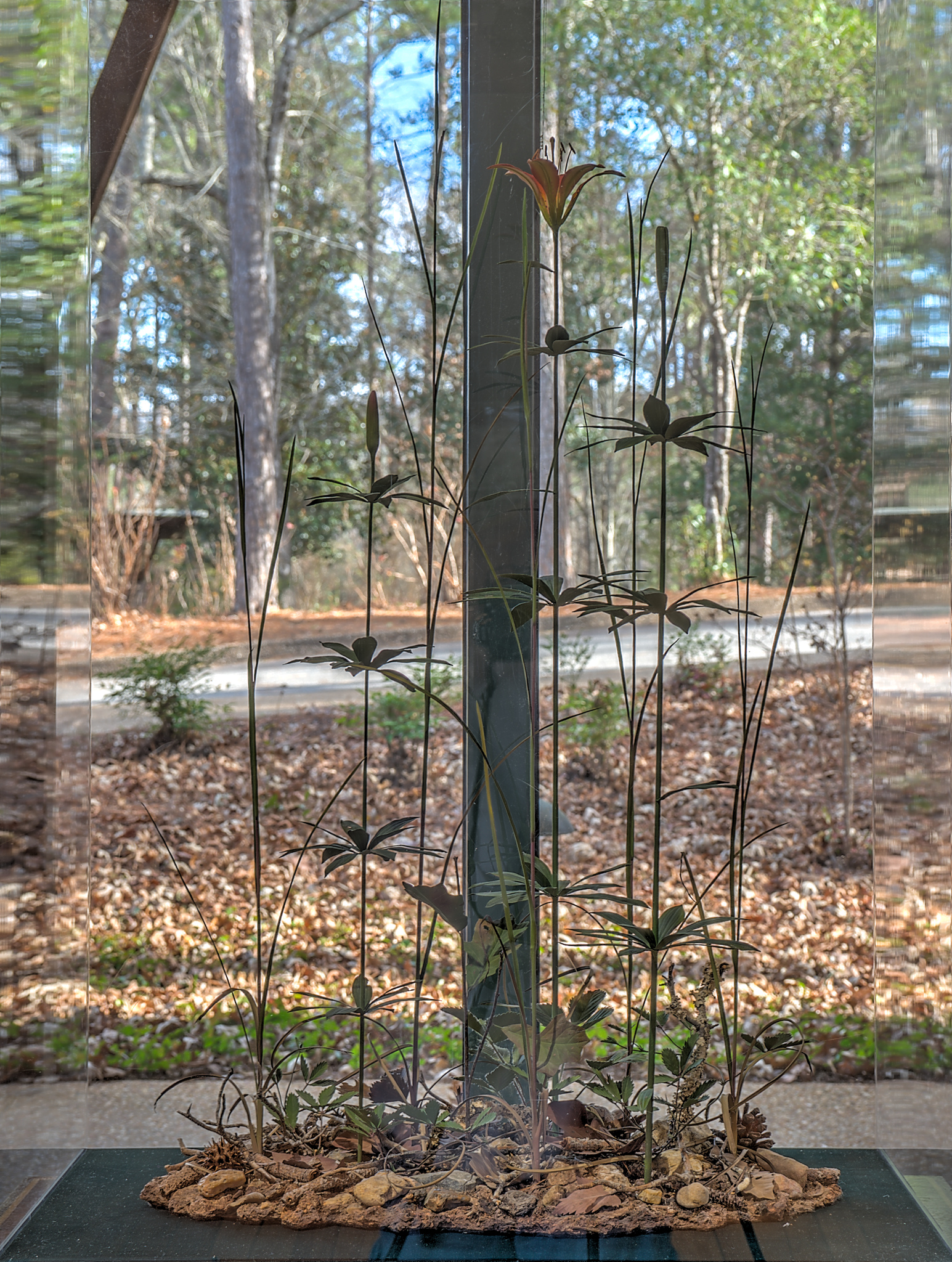
Exhibit at Callaway Gardens
