= List of University of Saskatchewan alumni =

Between 1907 and 2007 there were over 132,200 alumni of the University of Saskatchewan. This list features notable people who have graduated from a degree, certificate and/or diploma program at the university.

== Agriculture ==
- Lorne Babiuk - immunologist, pathogenesist, virologist, molecular virology, and vaccinologist
- Howard Fredeen - animal breeding researcher
- Lawrence Kirk - agronomist best known for introducing crested wheatgrass
- J.W. Grant MacEwan - director of the School of Agriculture, professor of Animal Husbandry, and lieutenant-governor of Alberta (1966–1974)
- Kenneth Norrie - economic historian specializing in the economy of Western Canada, especially prairie wheat farming
- Cecil Frederick Patterson - introduced 52 new varieties of hardy fruits for the prairies and over 18 varieties of hybrid hardy lilies
- Clayton Oscar Person - international authority on the genetics of host-parasite relations

== Arts and entertainment ==
- Robert Boyer - Canadian visual artist of aboriginal heritage; BEd from the Regina Campus of the U of S in 1971
- Kim Coates - actor, honorary Doctor of Letters
- Stephen Fox - clarinet maker
- Agnes Gallus - painter
- Garnet Hertz - artist, designer and academic; Canada Research Chair
- Frances Hyland - actress
- William G. Hobbs - physician, surgeon, major Canadian artist
- Ann James - English-born Canadian artist and educator
- Laurel Johannesson - artist
- Deborah Theaker - actress known as Casey Edison on the science fiction comedy show Manic Mansion
- Gordon Thiessen OC - governor of the Bank of Canada; one of the "100 Alumni of Influence" from the U of S

== Business ==
- Tom Anselmi - president and COO of Maple Leaf Sports & Entertainment
- H. Douglas Barber - founder of Electrical Engineering Canadian; CEO of Gennum Corporation
- N. Murray Edwards - billionaire
- John E. Floyd - economist
- Chad Hamre - entrepreneur
- Daryl "Doc" Seaman, OC, honorary Doctor of Laws - businessman; one of the "100 Alumni of Influence" from the U of S
- Arnold Tremere - executive director, government official (Canadian International Grains Institute)
- Steven Gregory Woods - entrepreneur
- Victor J. Zaleschuk - chair of the board of Cameco Corporation

== Computers, engineering, and technology ==
- Fred Mannering - professor at University of South Florida, Clarivate Highly Cited Researcher, member of the U.S. National Academy of Engineering
- Permanand Mohan - chief examiner for the Caribbean Examinations Council's CAPE Examinations in Computer Science
- W. Brett Wilson - entrepreneur, philanthropist; former Dragon's Den panelist; co-founder of FirstEnergy Capital; founder, president, and chairman of Prairie Merchant Capital; chairman of Canoe Financial

== Educators ==
- Dominique Abrioux - former president of Athabasca University
- John Hall Archer - librarian, historian, civil servant, first president of the University of Regina
- Reginald John Godfrey Bateman - professor of English
- George Fredrick Curtis - dean of the University of British Columbia Faculty of Law
- R. Peter MacKinnon - lawyer, legal academic, president of the U of S
- Darin Nesbitt - instructor of political science at Douglas College in New Westminster, B.C.
- A K M Siddiq - 18th vice-chancellor of the University of Dhaka
- Paul Thagard - professor of Philosophy, with cross appointment to Psychology and Computer Science, and director of the Cognitive Science Program, at the University of Waterloo
- Henry (Harry) George Thode, CC, MBE, FRSC - president and vice-chancellor of McMaster University; one of the "100 Alumni of Influence" from the U of S

== Environmentalists ==
- Richard St. Barbe Baker - English forester, environmental activist, and author
- Jim MacNeill - consultant, environmentalist, and international public servant

== Historians ==
- Frank Kusch - historian of American history

== Journalism/publishing/broadcasting ==
- Eric Malling - television journalist
- Sally Merchant - television personality and political figure

== Law, government, and public policy ==
- Don Atchison - mayor of Saskatoon, Saskatchewan
- Pat Atkinson - politician
- Chris Axworthy - politician
- Gordon Barnhart - university secretary, professor in Canadian Politics, former lieutenant governor of Saskatchewan
- Dave Batters - politician
- Edward Dmytro Bayda - chief justice of Saskatchewan
- Clément Chartier - Métis Canadian leader
- Kenny Chiu - member of Parliament
- Brooke Claxton - veteran of World War I, federal minister of National Health and Welfare and minister of National Defence; honorary Doctor of Laws degree from the U of S
- Eric Cline - politician
- Roméo Dallaire, OC, CMM, GOQ, MSC, CD - senator, humanitarian, author and retired general; honorary Doctor of Laws degree from the U of S
- Jonathan Denis - 23rd minister of Justice of Alberta and notable Calgary lawyer
- Grant Devine - 11th premier of Saskatchewan
- John Diefenbaker, CH, PC, KC - 13th prime minister of Canada; university's chancellor; he and his wife were buried at the university, near the Diefenbaker Canada Centre
- Noah Evanchuk - 2011 Canadian federal election candidate, Saskatchewan Provincial Court judge
- Laurie Evans - politician
- Clarence Fines - provincial treasurer of Saskatchewan
- Jon Gerrard, PC - politician and medical doctor
- Ralph Goodale, PC - minister of Agriculture, minister of Natural Resources, minister of Public Works, minister of Finance, minister of Public Safety and Emergency Preparedness
- Alvin Hamilton, PC - politician
- Robert Hanbidge, honorary Doctor of Laws - lawyer, municipal, provincial and federal politician, and lieutenant governor of Saskatchewan
- Lynda M. Haverstock - lieutenant governor of Saskatchewan (2000–2006); leader of the Saskatchewan Liberal Party
- Benjamin D. Heppner - school teacher, businessman and politician
- John Hewson - Australian politician
- Ray Hnatyshyn - 24th governor general of Canada
- Constance D. Hunt - lawyer, legal academic, and judge
- Gerard Jennissen - politician
- Fredrick W. Johnson - 16th lieutenant governor of Saskatchewan
- Georgina Jolibois - mayor and former member of Parliament
- Gordon Kirkby - politician, mayor and lawyer
- Otto Lang, PC, OC, KC - politician
- Léonard Hilarion Joseph Legault - diplomat
- Harold Hugh MacKay, OC, KC - lawyer and corporate director
- Murdoch MacPherson, KC - attorney-general of Saskatchewan; honorary Doctor of Civil Law degree from U of S
- Jim Maddin - mayor of Saskatoon
- James Mallory - jurist; academic; constitutional expert; instructor in political science at U of S
- Edward Cyril Malone - Saskatchewan lawyer and politician
- William McIntyre, CC (born 1918) - retired puisne justice of the Supreme Court of Canada
- Stewart McLean - Manitoba politician
- Gary Merasty, M.P. - politician; one of the "100 Alumni of Influence" from the U of S
- Anthony Merchant, KC - Saskatchewan lawyer
- George Porteous - 14th lieutenant governor of Saskatchewan
- Alison Redford, ECA, KC - 14th premier of Alberta
- Robert Gordon Robertson, PC, CC FRSC - commissioner of the Northwest Territories
- David Rodney - politician, teacher, and professional speaker
- Roy Romanow, PC, OC, SOM, KC - politician and 12th premier of Saskatchewan; one of the "100 Alumni of Influence" from the U of S
- Tillie Taylor - judge, first chair of the Saskatchewan Human Rights Commission
- Andrew Thomson - minister of Finance of Saskatchewan
- William Ferdinand Alphonse Turgeon - politician and diplomat
- John Thomas Wolfe - Canadian provincial politician
- Stephen Worobetz, OC, MC, SOM - physician and former Lieutenant Governor of Saskatchewan; one of the "100 Alumni of Influence" from the U of S
- Clifford Wright - mayor of Saskatoon; honorary Doctor of Laws
- Iva Yeo - politician

== Literature ==
- William Barr - Arctic historian; U of S faculty member
- Dennis Cooley - poet
- Lorna Crozier, a.k.a. Lorna Uher - poet
- Dawn Dumont, author, BA 1995
- Sarah Ens - poet
- Richard Epp - playwright
- Michael Helm - novelist
- Maureen Hunter - playwright
- Eli Mandel - poet and literary academic
- William Sarjeant - geologist and novelist
- Joseph Schull - playwright and historian
- Tasha Spillett-Sumner - writer and educator
- Guy Clarence Vanderhaeghe, OC, SOM - fiction author; one of the "100 Alumni of Influence" from the U of S
- William Whitehead - writer, actor and filmmaker

== Medicine ==
- Hulda Regehr Clark - naturopath, author, and controversial practitioner of alternative medicine
- Dmytro Cipywnyk, CM - physician and academic
- Emmett Matthew Hall, CC, KC - jurist and civil libertarian; considered one of the fathers of the Canadian system of Medicare
- Franklin M. Loew - one of the team that developed canola oil; recipient of the Queen's Jubilee Medal
- Charles Randal Smith - head pediatric forensic pathologist

== Nobel Prize winners ==
- Gerhard Herzberg - Nobel Prize in Chemistry, 1970; was offered a position in 1935 to flee Nazi Germany, and remained at the university for ten years
- Henry Taube, FRSC - Nobel Prize in Chemistry, 1983

== Philosophy ==
- Zenon Pylyshyn - cognitive scientist and philosopher

== Science ==
- Sylvia Fedoruk - university chancellor, professor in Oncology, associate member in Physics, and lieutenant-governor of Saskatchewan (1988–1994)
- William Sarjeant - geologist and novelist
- Elizabeth Scarr - researcher in neuropathology
- Raymond Thorsteinsson - geologist of the high Arctic; one of the "100 Alumni of Influence" from the U of S]
- Thorbergur Thorvaldson - scientist and first dean of graduate studies at the U of S
- James Till O.C., O.Ont., F.R.S.C. - biophysicist, medical researcher who demonstrated the existence of stem cells; one of the "100 Alumni of Influence" from the U of S

== Sociologists ==
- Samuel Delbert Clark - sociologist

== Sports ==
- Kelly Bates - B.C. Lions, CFL and U of S Saskatchewan Huskies football player
- Rod Bryden - owner of the Ottawa Senators; professor of law at U of S
- Tyson Craiggs - B.C. Lions, CFL and U of S Saskatchewan Huskies football player
- Nikita Ens - Paralympic swimmer
- Cyprian Enweani - sprinter
- George Genereux - physician and trap shooting gold medal winner
- Charles Cecil Hay - ice hockey player, organizer, and administrator
- Diane Jones-Konihowski, C.M. - pentathlete
- Dave King - hockey coach
- Gene Makowsky - Saskatchewan Roughriders lineman of the CFL
- Shannon Miller - hockey coach
- Sandra Schmirler, SOM, BSPE - curler; Olympic and triple World Champion; one of the '100 Alumni of Influence" from the U of S
- Don Wittman - nationally recognized sports broadcaster in Canada
- Viola Yanik - wrestler

== Theology ==
- Maurice Baudoux - priest and archbishop of Saint Boniface, Manitoba
- Walter H. Farquharson - hymn-writer
- Herbert V. Günther - Buddhist; professor and Head of the Department of Far Eastern Studies at the U of S
- Muzaffar Iqbal - founding president of the Center for Islam and Science
- Raymond L. Schultz - national bishop of the Evangelical Lutheran Church in Canada

== Honorary degree recipients ==
- Arnold Davidson Dunton, CC, Doctor of Laws, honoris causa - educator and public administrator
- Charles Cecil Hay, honorary doctorate - ice hockey player, organizer, and administrator

== See also ==
- University of Saskatchewan academics
