= University of Saskatchewan College of Law =

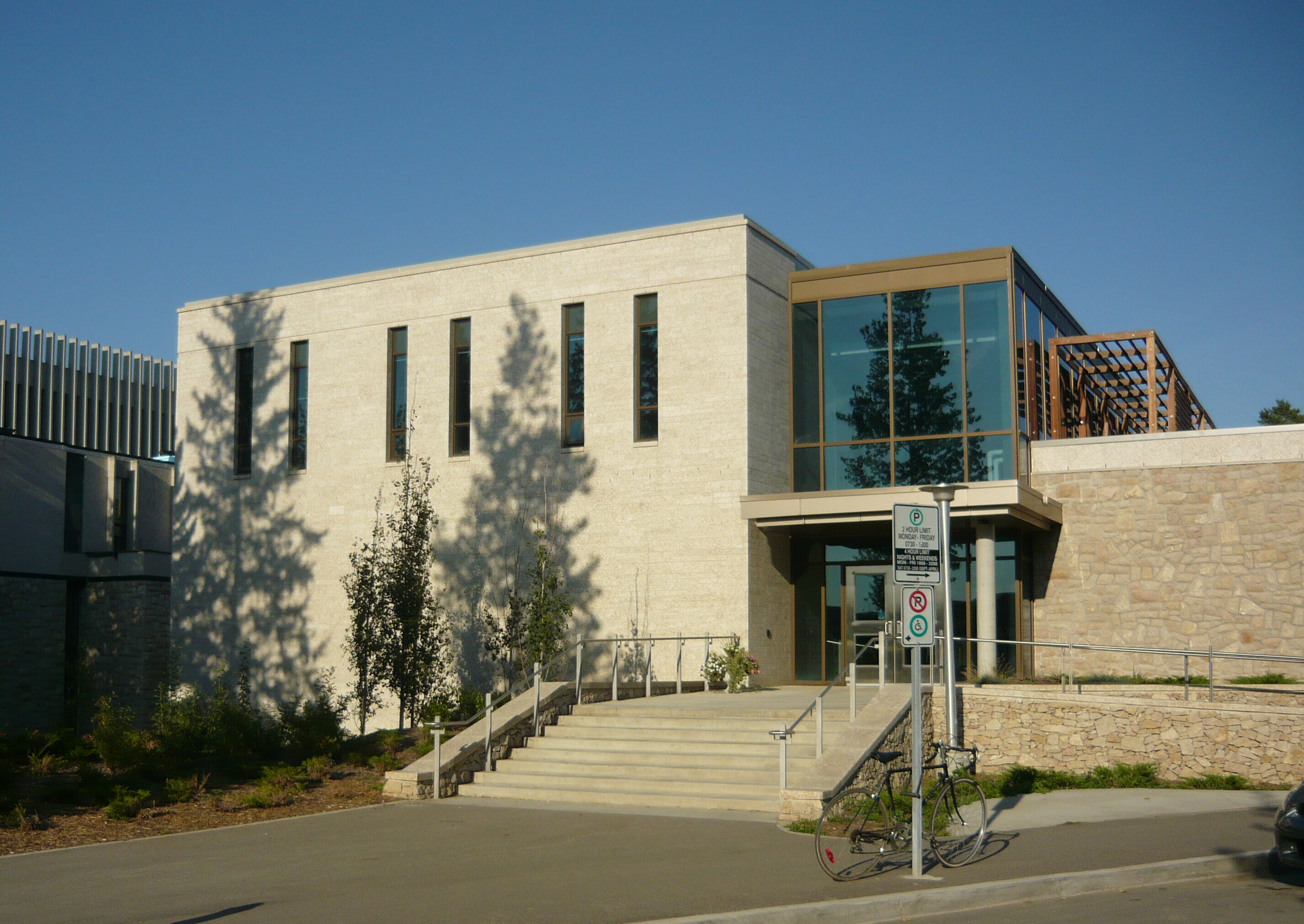
- College of Law Building
- Motto: Fiat justitia (Let Justice Be Done) {College}, and Deo et Patriae (For God and Country) {University}.
- Type: Public
- Established: 1912; 114 years ago
- Academic affiliations: UArctic, AUCC, IAU, CIS, ACU, CUSID, CWUAA
- Chancellor: Roy Romanow
- President: Peter Stoicheff
- Dean: Martin Phillipson
- Academic staff: 29
- Students: 346
- Undergraduates: 347
- Location: Saskatoon, Saskatchewan, Canada; 52°7′47″N 106°37′58″W
- Campus: Urban
- Colours: Green and white
- Nickname: Saskatchewan Huskies
- Mascot: Huskie
- Website: www.usask.ca/law

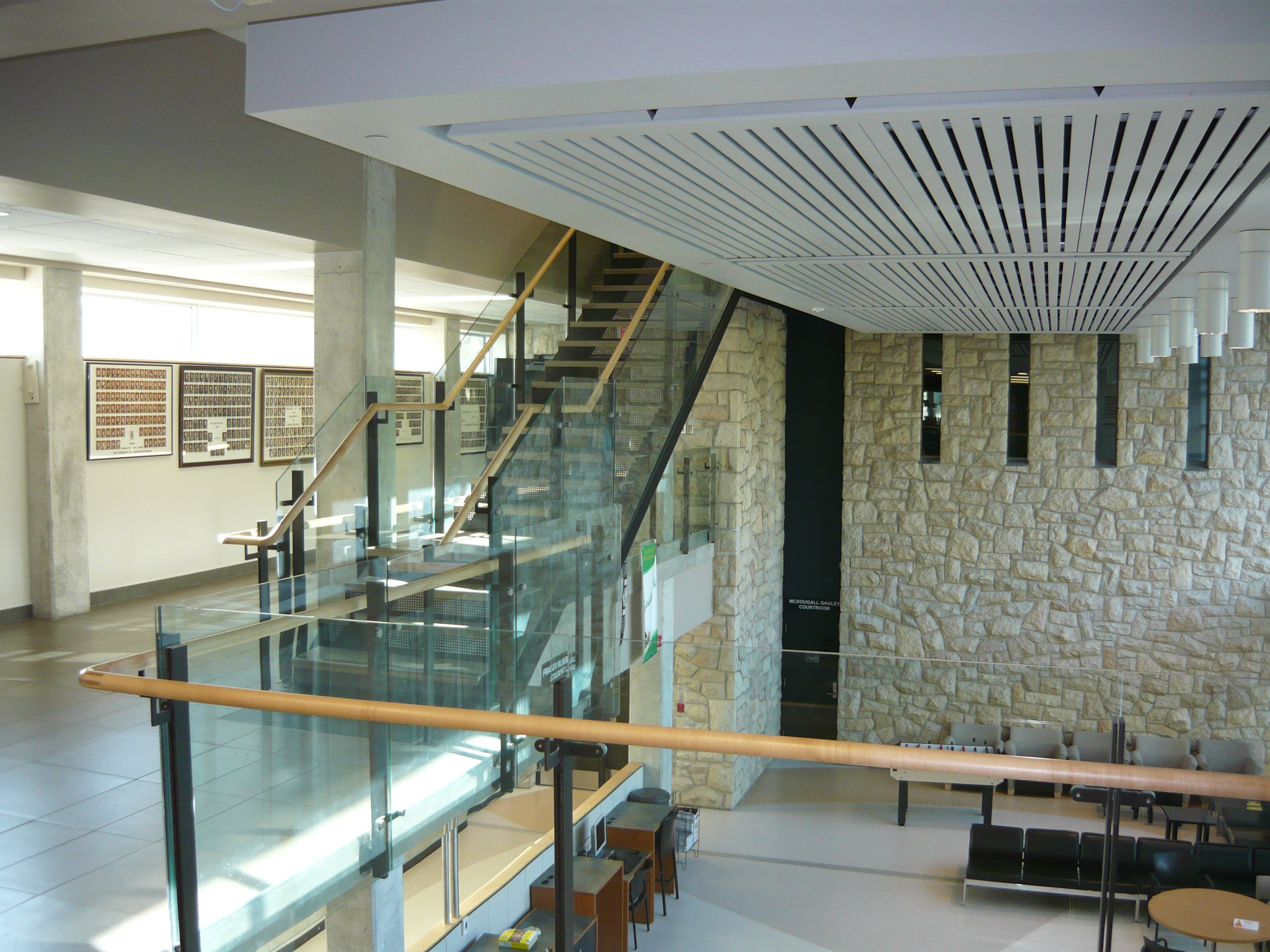
Atrium

The College of Law at the University of Saskatchewan is the university's law school. Located in Saskatoon in the Canadian province of Saskatchewan, the College of Law was established in 1912 and is the oldest law school in Western Canada, a distinction it shares with the University of Alberta.

Approximately 126 students are admitted to the College of Law each year. In the fall term of 2011/2012, the college had 375 students. Previously, it had 373 students (2010/2011); 362 students (2009/2010); and 370 students (2008/2009). The current dean is Martin Phillipson.

== History ==
University rankings

World rankings

Canadian rankings

At the beginning of the 20th century, there was no structured course of legal training in Saskatchewan. Completion of high school was the only prerequisite for admission to a five-year apprenticeship (3 years for those with a university degree).

In the spring of 1913, the University of Saskatchewan appointed its first law professor, Arthur Moxon, previously a professor of classics in the university's College of Arts and Sciences. At around the same time, the Law Society of Saskatchewan began offering lectures to articling students in Regina at a school of its own making, later called Wetmore Hall. The following decade would be marked by conflict between the Law Society and the fledgling University law faculty regarding responsibility for legal training in the Province.

Ultimately, Wetmore Hall was closed by resolution of the Law Society in 1922 and the University of Saskatchewan inherited full responsibility for the training of aspiring lawyers in Saskatchewan.

The college celebrated its centenary in 2012.

== Academics ==
The college offers both the Juris Doctor (J.D.) and Master of Laws degrees. Of the 16 common law schools in Canada, the college placed tenth in the 2011 Maclean's Magazine law school rankings.

== Facilities ==
The college's Law Building reopened in March 2008 following renovations and expansions. The new building is 3,300 m^{2}; and took just over two years and $16.5 million to complete. The Law Foundation of Saskatchewan contributed $1 million to the project.

The new building has additional classrooms with multimedia capability, additional administrative offices, a new student lounge, student organization offices, and space for the college's Native Law Centre. The new building has a "living roof" which is the largest of its kind in Saskatchewan, and the building is LEED Gold-certified.

The law building is connected to the Edwards School of Business and, indirectly, the Arts Building. The law building is located opposite Campus Drive from the Saskatoon Cancer Centre and Royal University Hospital.

The law library contains numerous artifacts, including one of the most unusual holographic wills ever written – the tractor fender of Cecil George Harris, who was trapped when his tractor overturned. On the fender he wrote, "In case I die in this mess I leave all to the wife. Cecil Geo. Harris." Harris died of his injuries in hospital, the fender was probated and accepted as his valid last will.

== Admissions ==
Tuition for September 2025 was $18,309 and mandatory student fees will be $1,308.24, for a total of $19,617.24. The cost of books and supplies is estimated at $2500.00. The 2025 entering class averaged an 84% and 159 LSAT.

== Challenge Cup ==
The Law Students' Association hosts an annual hockey tournament in March or April, known as The Challenge Cup. The format of the one-day tournament sees first, second, and third year students form respective teams to battle with one another as well as with teams composed of Junior and Senior Alumni. The Challenge Cup was most recently won by the Class of 2025.

== Law Students' Association ==
The Law Students’ Association (LSA) is the primary student-run organization representing Juris Doctor students at the University of Saskatchewan College of Law. The LSA provides academic, professional, and social support to its members and acts as a liaison between the student body and the college administration. It coordinates student services, academic representation, social and athletic events, and community outreach initiatives to enhance the law school experience. Although membership is voluntary, it operates on a break-even basis and helps cover the costs of events and services. The association plays a central role in student governance, advocacy, and extracurricular engagement within the College of Law.

2026–2027 Executive Council

- Jayden Blumhagen - President.
- Tyler Slaney - Vice-President, Academic.
- Mia Flett - Vice-President, Finance.
- Janay Kent - Vice-President, External and Community Relations.
- Natalie Ofukany - Vice-President, Student Affairs.
- Brady Miller - Vice-President, Indigenous Relations.
- Brody Burr - Vice-President, Administration.

== Notable alumni ==
- Edward Bayda - Chief Justice of Saskatchewan.
- Ted Culliton - Chief Justice of Saskatchewan.
- John Diefenbaker - Prime Minister of Canada.
- Willard Zebedee Estey - Puisne Justice of the Supreme Court of Canada.
- Jonathan Denis, QC - Former Alberta attorney general and well known Calgary businessperson.
- Ralph Goodale - Canadian High Commissioner to the United Kingdom; former Cabinet Minister; former Member of Parliament & Member of the Legislative Assembly of Saskatchewan.
- Bruce Gordon #BeLikeBruce, athlete and Detective Sergeant
- John Gormley - Talk radio host and former Member of Parliament.
- Emmett Matthew Hall - Puisne Justice of the Supreme Court of Canada.
- Jeremy Harrison - Former Member of Parliament, current Saskatchewan MLA
- Ray Hnatyshyn - Governor General of Canada.
- Constance Hunt - Justice of the Alberta Court of Appeal.
- John Klebuc - Chief Justice of Saskatchewan.
- Otto Lang - Dean of the college, Member of Parliament and Cabinet Minister.
- Peter MacKinnon - President of the University of Saskatchewan.
- William McIntyre - Puisne Justice of the Supreme Court of Canada.
- Glennys McVeigh - Judge of the Federal Court of Canada
- Alison Redford - Premier of Alberta.
- Roy Romanow - Premier of Saskatchewan.
- Nicole Sarauer - member of the Saskatchewan Legislative Assembly.

== See also ==
- List of law schools in Canada
