= R v Mercure =

Supreme Court of Canada case on language rights

- Supreme Court of Canada

Hearing: November 26, 27, 1986 Judgment: February 25, 1988
- Full case name: André Mercure (Appellant) v Attorney General for Saskatchewan (Respondent) and Fédération des francophones hors Québec, Association canadienne-française de l'Alberta and Association culturelle franco-canadienne de la Saskatchewan (Interveners —principal parties) and Attorney General for Alberta and Freedom of Choice Movement (Interveners)
- Citations: [1988] 1 SCR 234, 1988 CanLII 107 (SCC)
- Docket No.: 19688
- Prior history: Judgment for Saskatchewan in the Saskatchewan Court of Appeal
- Ruling: Appeal allowed

Holding
- French language rights guaranteed by s 110 of The North-West Territories Act continued to apply in Saskatchewan

Court membership
- Chief Justice: Brian Dickson; Puisne Justices: Jean Beetz, Willard Estey, William McIntyre, Julien Chouinard, Antonio Lamer, Bertha Wilson, Gerald Le Dain, Gérard La Forest

Reasons given
- Majority: La Forest (Dickson, Beetz, Lamer, Wilson and Le Dain concurring)
- Dissent: Estey (McIntyre concurring)
- Chouinard did not participate in the final disposition of the judgment.

Laws applied
- The North-West Territories Act, RSC 1886, c. 50, s. 110; Saskatchewan Act, SC 1905, c. 42, ss. 14, 16

R v Mercure is a decision by the Supreme Court of Canada in 1988, dealing with language rights in the province of Saskatchewan.

The court granted the appeal, holding that the appellant, Père André Mercure, had the right to use French in the Saskatchewan courts, and that provincial legislation had to be enacted in both languages. Those rights were based on a provision of the old North-West Territories Act which the majority held was still in force in Saskatchewan. However, the court rejected the appellant's argument that those rights were constitutionally entrenched in Saskatchewan. Since those rights were set out in an ordinary statute, the Legislature could amend them by provincial legislation.

Following the decision, the Saskatchewan Legislature passed The Language Act, which preserved the rights to use French in the Legislative Assembly and the courts, but repealed the obligation to enact all laws in French. Instead, The Language Act provided that the Legislature could choose to enact laws in English only, or bilingually.

One unusual feature of the case is that the appellant, Père Mercure, died before the Supreme Court could hear the appeal. The court allowed three francophone associations to argue the appeal in place of Mercure.

== Facts of the case ==
Père André Mercure was a Roman Catholic priest in The Battlefords area of Saskatchewan. He had long been a leader in the promotion of French culture in Alberta and Saskatchewan. Amongst other initiatives, he had developed Scouting programs in French for Fransaskois youth, as well as organizing travel programs for young francophones, such as Saskatchewan étudiante voyage (SEV).

Mercure strongly believed that French was constitutionally entrenched in Saskatchewan. Some said that when driving, he regularly sped past the local Royal Canadian Mounted Police (RCMP) detachment in hopes of getting a speeding ticket which he could use to raise the issue of the constitutional status of French. (He was also known to "have a heavy foot behind the wheel".) Traffic tickets had been used in other provinces at that period to raise similar issues of language status.

Late in 1980 Mercure received a speeding ticket from an RCMP officer. The ticket was written entirely in English. He consulted a local fransaskois lawyer, Raymond Blais. They decided that they would use the ticket to make the argument that Mercure had the right to have a trial conducted in French, and to raise the issue of the constitutional status of French in Saskatchewan.

== Decisions of the Saskatchewan courts ==
=== Provincial Court ===
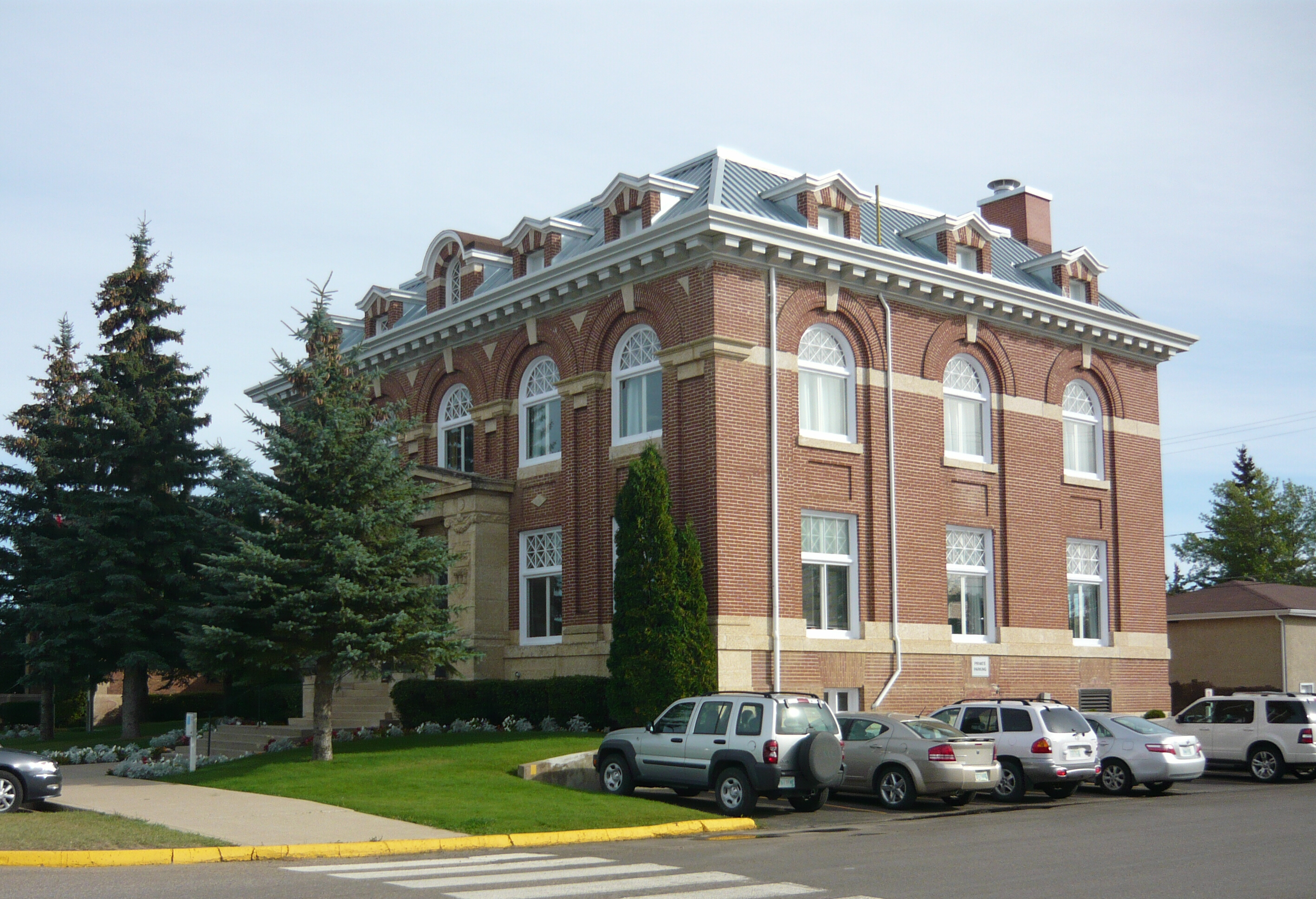
The Battleford Court House, where the trial was held

The trial on the speeding ticket occurred in the Provincial Court of Saskatchewan before Judge Deshaye, beginning with submissions on the use of French in the trial. Blais argued that s. 133 of the Constitution Act, 1867, s. 110 of the North-West Territories Act of 1886, and the Saskatchewan Act together constitutionally entrenched French in Saskatchewan. He relied on the point that Saskatchewan had been carved out of the North-West Territories in 1905, and therefore submitted that the previous legislation from the North-West Territories had a continuing effect, via s. 16 of the Saskatchewan Act.

Based on that position, Blais argued that Mercure had the following rights:

1. the right to use French in the trial;
2. the right to have the trial conducted in French;
3. the right to have the trial conducted by a judge who could understand French and could conduct the trial in French;
4. the right to have the relevant statutes available in French.

Applying the fourth point, Blais argued that the following five statutes had to be bilingual for Mercure's trial:

1. The Vehicle Act;
2. The Summary Offences Procedure Act;
3. The Interpretation Act;
4. The Saskatchewan Evidence Act;
5. The Provincial Court Act.

His primary argument was based on s. 110 of the North-West Territories Act, the federal statute that had been in force prior to the creation of Saskatchewan by the Saskatchewan Act. That statute provided:

110. Either the English or the French language may be used by any person in the debates of the Legislative Assembly of the Territories and in the proceedings before the courts; and both those languages shall be used in the records and journals of such Assembly; and all ordinances made under this Act shall be printed in both those languages ...

Blais argued that s. 16 of the Saskatchewan Act, which had continued in force the laws applicable in the North-West Territories prior to the creation of Saskatchewan, meant that s. 110 applied to the Legislative Assembly and the courts of Saskatchewan. His alternative argument was that s. 133 of the Constitution Act, 1867, which provides that French can be used in "any court of Canada" gave Mercure the same rights with respect to the courts in Saskatchewan as in federal courts.

The Crown prosecutor, David Arnot, argued that s. 110 of the North-West Territories Act was not in force in Saskatchewan and was not continued by s. 16 of the Saskatchewan Act. Alternatively, by its terms s. 110 only applied to the courts of the North-West Territories and did not have any continuing effect for the new courts created by the province. Express language would be needed to provide for language guarantees, as had been done when Manitoba became a province through the Manitoba Act, 1870.

Judge Deshaye ruled on these submissions on April 15, 1981. He rejected the argument based on s. 133 entirely, holding that in the context of that section, "court of Canada" meant federal courts only.

On the other part of the argument, Deshaye did agree that s. 16 of the Saskatchewan Act had carried forward s. 110. He held that s. 110 clearly gave rights, and express language in a subsequent statute would be needed to extinguish those rights. However, he concluded that s. 110 only had continuing application to the courts, but not for the new provincial Legislative Assembly. As well, it gave the right to use French, but not the right to a trial conducted entirely in French, by a bilingual judge. Since s. 110 did not apply to the Legislative Assembly of Saskatchewan, there was no right to French versions of the statutes.

Based on Deshaye's ruling, Mercure advised the court that he wished to stand mute. He declined to enter a plea or to call evidence. As trial judge, Deshaye entered a plea of not guilty on his behalf, in English. The Crown called its evidence, and the court convicted Mercure on the speeding charge.

=== Court of Appeal ===
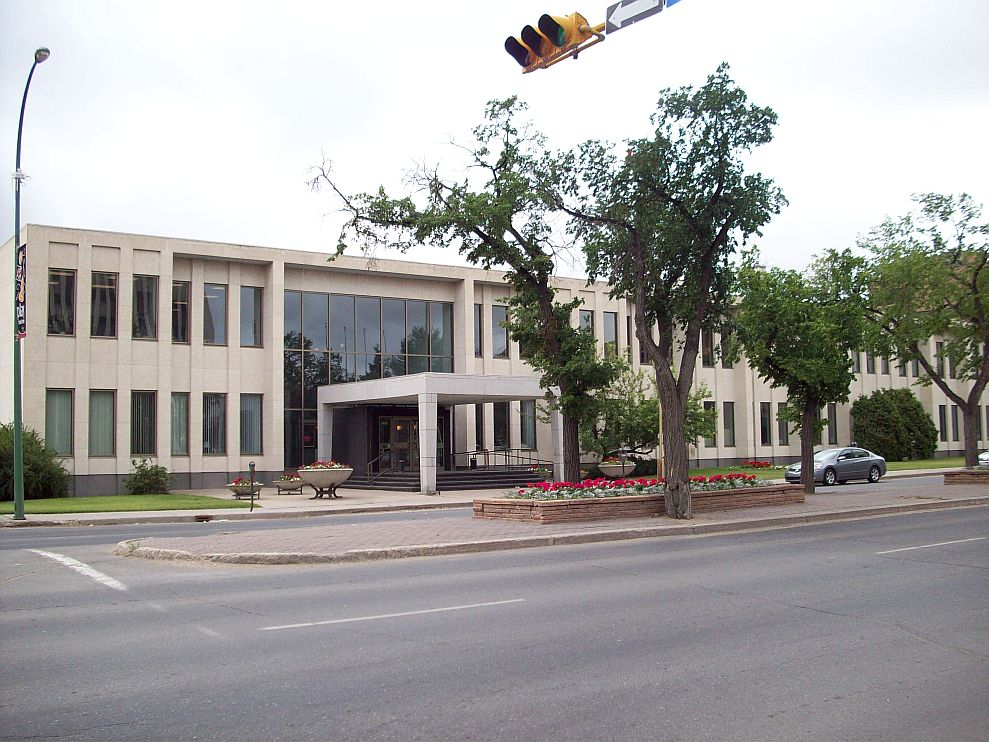
The Regina Court House, where the Saskatchewan Court of Appeal sat on the appeal

Mercure appealed the case to the Saskatchewan Court of Appeal, the highest court in the province. The court set a five-judge panel to hear the case, which was an indication of the importance the court saw in the case; it normally sits in panels of three judges. The court took four years to hear and decide the case, rendering its decision in October 1985.

Blais continued to represent Mercure. The province was represented on the appeal by two counsel from the Constitutional Law Branch of the Saskatchewan Department of Justice, James MacPherson and Cheryl Crane.

The Court of Appeal unanimously upheld Judge Deshaye's decision, although with a 4–1 split on reasons. Chief Justice Bayda wrote the decision of the majority, largely taking the same approach as Deshaye. He made an additional point, namely that since s. 110 was an ordinary statute, it could be repealed or amended by the Legislature. He concluded that it was not constitutionally entrenched.

Justices Cameron and Tallis each wrote short concurring decisions, generally agreeing with the chief justice. Tallis commented that the decision would not be welcomed by the Francophone community in Saskatchewan and was not consistent with the recognition of French and English as official languages in Canada, but pointed out that the Legislature could expand French language rights in the courts, including retroactively.

Justice Hall agreed that the appeal should be dismissed, but dissented on the reasons. He took the view that s. 16 was solely transitional, to cover the period between the creation of Saskatchewan and the establishment of new provincial laws and institutions. It therefore did not carry forward s. 110 for courts created by the province.

The Court of Appeal thus unanimously dismissed the appeal, but by a 4–1 split held that s. 110 continued to apply to the Saskatchewan courts.

== Decision of the Supreme Court ==
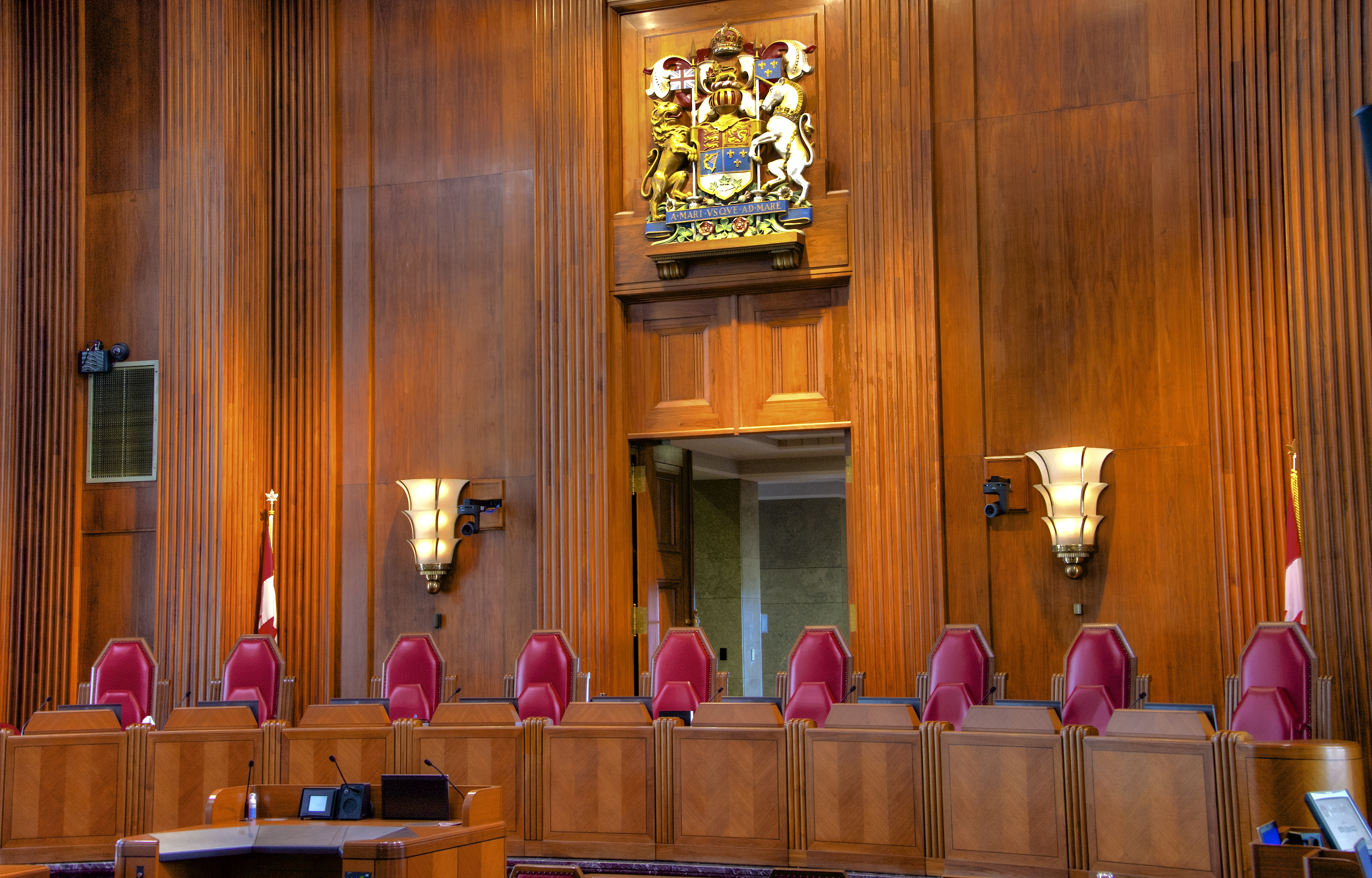
Courtroom of the Supreme Court of Canada, where the final appeal was heard

=== Death of Père Mercure pending appeal ===
Mercure applied for leave to appeal to the Supreme Court, which a three-judge panel of the court granted on January 27, 1986. However, Mercure died of cancer before the court could hear the appeal. Three francophone associations then applied for leave to be substituted as parties and to be allowed to continue the appeal, even though it was legally moot on the death of the accused. The court has discretion to allow a moot case to proceed, if it raises an important issue of public law and an adversarial element is still present. The court appointed the Fédération des francophones hors Québec, the Association canadienne-française de l'Alberta and the Association culturelle franco-canadienne de la Saskatchewan as interveners and principal parties to argue the appeal.

=== Ruling of the Supreme Court ===
The Supreme Court heard the appeal on November 26, 1986, with a full court of nine judges. Counsel for the francophone groups who now had carriage of the appeal were Michel Bastarache and Roger Lepage. Counsel for Saskatchewan were Robert G. Richards and Cheryl Crane.

The court allowed the appeal on February 25, 1988, in a 6-2 decision, (Note: Justice Chouinard sat on the appeal when it was heard by the court, but died in February 1987, a year before the decision was rendered.) setting aside the late Père Mercure's conviction on the speeding ticket. The court also answered the various constitutional questions raised by the case.

==== Majority decision: Justice La Forest ====
Justice La Forest gave the majority decision, with Chief Justice Dickson and Justices Beetz, Lamer, Wilson and Le Dain concurring. He ruled that language rights enjoyed an almost constitutional status and could only be repealed by a "clear legislative pronouncement". He agreed with the Saskatchewan courts that s. 110 continued to be in force in Saskatchewan, and with Chief Justice Bayda's comment that the language rights in s. 110 were not specifically linked to any institutions. He also agreed that s. 110 did not confer a right to a trial in French. The accused could speak French, but the judge could use an interpreter. The right to use French did, however, include the right to have anything said in French to be entered into the court's records in that language, and not by a translated version.

La Forest also agreed with Bayda in the Court of Appeal on the status of s. 110. It was an ordinary statute, not constitutionally entrenched. The Legislature could amend or repeal s. 110, provided the amending legislation was enacted in both languages.

However, he overturned the rulings of the Saskatchewan courts concerning the language of the statutes. He held that s. 110 had been continued for all purposes by s. 16 of the Saskatchewan Act. That meant it applied to the provincial Legislative Assembly, which was required to enact all laws in both languages. All laws enacted since 1905, Saskatchewan’s entry into Confederation, were invalid. Saskatchewan could either re-enact all laws since 1905 in bilingual format, or it could retroactively validate the unilingual legislation, provided the validation was done by a bilingual statute. In the meantime, the laws were deemed to be valid, to preserve the rule of law.

Finally, La Forest held that the right to speak French included the right to use French in procedural steps, and to have all statements in French recorded in that language in the court's records. Since Deshaye had not permitted Mercure to plead guilty in French, the entire trial was a nullity, and the conviction was set aside.

==== Dissent: Justice Estey ====
Justice Estey dissented, with Justice McIntyre concurring. Estey agreed with the majority that s. 133 of the Constitution Act, 1867 has no application to courts of Saskatchewan, and also agreed that s. 110 of the North-West Territories Act had not been incorporated into the provincial constitution. However, he concluded that each province normally has the power to determine what language rights will exist. Express language would be needed to incorporate language rights into the provincial constitution, as had occurred with the Manitoba Act, 1870.

Estey disagreed with the majority on the issue of s. 110 being continued by s. 16 of the Saskatchewan Act. In his view, the language rights set out in s. 110 specifically applied only to the territorial courts established by the federal government prior to 1905, and to the Legislative Assembly of the North-West Territories. When those courts and the territorial Legislative Assembly were abolished, the rights were extinguished. Section 16 did not apply those rights to the new provincial Legislative Assembly established by the Saskatchewan Act, nor to the courts subsequently established by the province.

== Subsequent events ==
=== Enactment of The Language Act / Loi linguistique ===
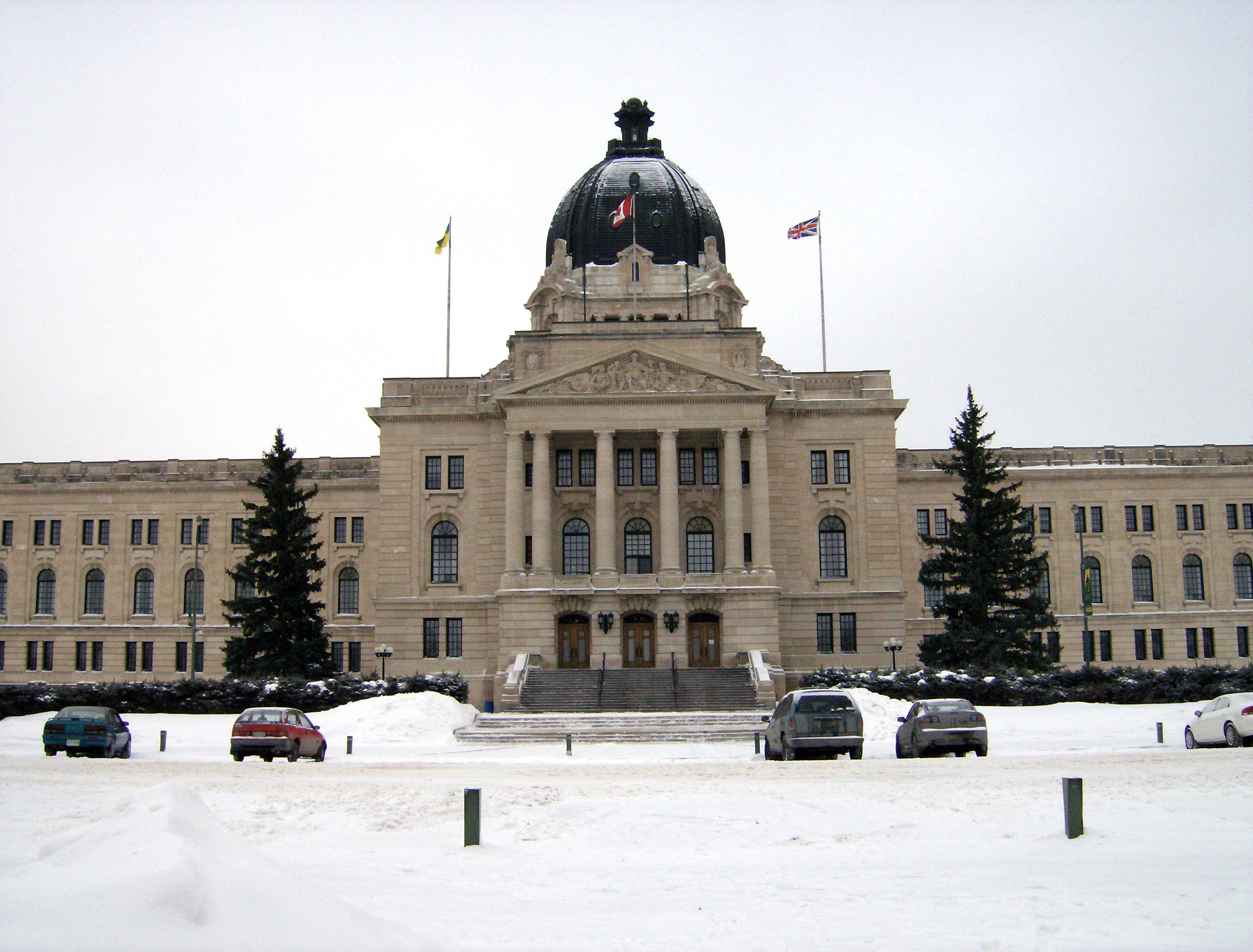
The Saskatchewan Legislative Building

In response to the Supreme Court decision, the Saskatchewan Legislature enacted The Language Act / Loi linguistique. The law was enacted bilingually, as required by the Supreme Court's interpretation of s. 110. It did four main things:

1. The right of individuals to use either language in the courts of the province was maintained;
2. The right of individuals to speak in the Legislative Assembly in either language was maintained;
3. The Legislative Assembly was given the power to enact laws in English only, or in both languages, with the French and English versions of bilingual legislation having equal force;
4. Section 110 was repealed, while retroactively validating all previous laws enacted in English only.

=== Implications for Alberta ===
Alberta and Saskatchewan were created at the same time in 1905, both carved out from the North-West Territories. Section 16 of the Alberta Act is worded identically to s. 16 of the Saskatchewan Act. The same issue about the use of French in the courts therefore arose in Alberta at the same time as the Mercure litigation was proceeding in Saskatchewan.

Following the Supreme Court decision, the Alberta government introduced its own Languages Act which repealed s. 110 and retroactively validated all the Alberta laws that had been passed in English only since 1905.

=== Caron case ===
In 2015, the issue arose again in a similar case from Alberta, the Caron case. The Supreme Court again held that French was not constitutionally entrenched in Alberta and Saskatchewan.
