= Robert Leurer =

Chief Justice of Saskatchewan

Robert W. Leurer is the tenth Chief Justice of Saskatchewan.

His judicial career began in 2017, when he was appointed to the Court of Queen's Bench for Saskatchewan. In 2018, he was appointed to the Court of Appeal for Saskatchewan, and in 2023 he succeeded Robert G. Richards as Chief Justice.

== Early life ==
Leurer attended McGill University, and earned a law degree from the University of Saskatchewan. Before entering private practice, he served as a law clerk for W. Z. Estey during Estey's term on the Supreme Court of Canada.

== Hobbies ==
Leurer is a fan of Canadian football, and served on the board of directors of the Saskatchewan Roughriders from 2011 to 2017.
