= Edward Hazen Walker =

Canadian politician

MLA for Gravelbourg
- In office 10 July 1951 – 1956
- Preceded by: E. M. Culliton
- Succeeded by: Lionel Coderre

Personal details
- Party: CCF

Edward Hazen Walker was a politician from the province of Saskatchewan in Canada.

== Career ==
He represented Gravelbourg on the Legislative Assembly, replacing E. M. Culliton who joined the Saskatchewan Court of Appeal.
