= Donald Maclean (judge) =

Canadian politician

- Born: 1877; Fourchu, Nova Scotia
- Died: July 5, 1947 (aged 69–70)

Donald Maclean (1877 – July 5, 1947) was a Canadian politician, judge, and university administrator. Between 1918 and 1921, he was in His Majesty's Loyal Opposition in Saskatchewan. In April 1921, he became accepted an appointment to the Court of King's Bench for Saskatchewan. He taught in the faculty of law at the University of Saskatchewan until 1923. An honorary Doctor of Civil Law was bestowed upon him May 9, 1947 for services rendered to the public especially within the University of Saskatchewan. Donald Maclean held a term of office on the University of Saskatchewan Board of Governors from 1932 to 1946. Donald Maclean was the fourth Chancellor of the University of Saskatchewan and served in this position from 1946 until his death in 1947.

== Early life ==
He was born in Fourchu, Richmond County, Nova Scotia, the son of Neil MacLean and Euphemia MacDonald, and was educated at the Pictou Academy and Dalhousie University. In 1909, MacLean moved to Saskatchewan.

== Political career ==
In the wartime Saskatchewan general election held June 26, 1917, Donald Maclean was elected to the Saskatoon City seat. William Melville Martin of the Liberal Party of Saskatchewan became premier of the province. Wellington Bartley Willoughby was leader of the Conservative Party at the time of the election, however, he stepped down when offered an appointment to the Senate of Canada. From 1918 through 1921, Donald Maclean was elected leader of the Conservative Party and His Majesty's Loyal Opposition. During his time in office, the School Act was amended to choose the English Language as the language of instruction in Saskatchewan's one room schoolhouses. The next Saskatchewan election was held June 9, 1921. However, Donald Maclean had accepted an appointment to the bench in April 1921, and left politics. James Thomas Milton Anderson was elected leader of the Conservative Party in 1924. The Conservative Party was split into Independent Conservatives and fractured groups and remained without a leader for three years.

Academic offices
| Preceded by P. E. MacKenzie | Chancellor of the University of Saskatchewan; 1946–1947 | Succeeded by F. H. Auld |
| Preceded by P. E. MacKenzie | Members of the Board of Governors of the University of Saskatchewan by appointment date 1932–1946 | Succeeded by A. W. Argue |
Party political offices
| Preceded by Wellington Bartley Willoughby | Leader of the Conservative Party of Saskatchewan; 1918–1921 | Succeeded by James Thomas Milton Anderson |
