= John Klebuc =

John Klebuc is a judge of the Court of Appeal for Saskatchewan and former Chief Justice of Saskatchewan.

Klebuc received a Bachelor of Laws and a Bachelor of Arts in 1964 from University of Saskatchewan and was called to the Bar of Saskatchewan in 1965. A lawyer, he was a partner at the law firm of MacPherson, Leslie & Tyerman from 1964 to 1993. In 1993, he was appointed Justice of the Court of Queen's Bench for Saskatchewan, Judicial Centre of Saskatoon. He was appointed Chief Justice of Saskatchewan in 2006. He stepped down as Chief Justice on June 30, 2013, and was replaced by Chief Justice Robert G. Richards.

Legal offices
Preceded by Edward Bayda	Chief Justice of Saskatchewan; 2006–2013	Succeeded by Robert G. Richards
