= List of historic places in Prince Albert =

This article is a list of historic places in Prince Albert, Saskatchewan entered on the Canadian Register of Historic Places, whether they are federal, provincial, or municipal.

== List of historic places ==
Name	Address	Coordinates	Government recognition (CRHP №)	Wikidata ID	Image
Armoury	Exhibition Drive and 8th Avenue East; Prince Albert SK	53°12′12″N 105°43′51″W	Federal (9724)		Upload Photo
Court House	19th Street and Central Avenue; Prince Albert SK	53°11′45″N 105°45′15″W	Prince Albert municipality (5803)		
Diefenbaker House National Historic Site	246 19th Street West; Prince Albert SK	53°11′46″N 105°45′43″W	Federal (23437)	Q5274537	Upload Photo
Land Titles Office	350 12th Street East; Prince Albert SK	53°12′08″N 105°44′43″W	Prince Albert municipality (4956)		Upload Photo
Wardens' Equipment Building	Prince Albert National Park of Canada; Prince Albert SK	53°55′21″N 106°05′13″W	Federal (10057)		Upload Photo
Octagonal Building	Exhibition Grounds; Prince Albert SK	53°12′12″N 105°43′44″W	Prince Albert municipality (1295)		Upload Photo
Former Prince Albert City Hall National Historic Site of Canada	1010 Central Avenue; Prince Albert SK	53°12′13″N 105°45′14″W	Federal (7536), Saskatchewan (2779), Prince Albert municipality (3074)	Q7243770	More images
McDonald Residence	314 14th Street West; Prince Albert SK	53°12′02″N 105°45′47″W	Prince Albert municipality (4949)		Upload Photo
Prince Albert Heritage Museum	10 River Street East; Prince Albert SK	53°12′22″N 105°45′18″W	Prince Albert municipality (4950)	Q7243777	More images
94 - 15th Street East	94-15th Street East; Prince Albert SK	53°11′59″N 105°45′07″W	Prince Albert municipality (4954)		Upload Photo
Keyhole Castle National Historic Site of Canada	1925 1st Avenue East; Prince Albert SK	53°11′42″N 105°45′07″W	Federal (7627)	Q6398292	Upload Photo
North Field Tower	Prince Albert SK	53°11′13″N 105°49′12″W	Federal (4328)		Upload Photo
Prince Albert Penitentiary, Northern Tower D-1	Prince Albert SK	53°11′58″N 105°48′47″W	Federal (9903)		Upload Photo
Southern Tower D-3	Prince Albert SK	53°11′46″N 105°49′01″W	Federal (9904)		Upload Photo
Prince Albert Penitentiary, Northern Tower D-4	Prince Albert SK	53°11′58″N 105°49′01″W	Federal (9905)		Upload Photo
Prince Albert Penitentiary, Southern Tower D-2	Prince Albert SK	53°11′N 105°49′W	Federal (9913)		Upload Photo
Holmes Residence	585 - 19th Street East; Prince Albert SK	53°11′45″N 105°44′17″W	Prince Albert municipality (16224)		Upload Photo

== See also ==
- List of National Historic Sites of Canada in Saskatchewan
