= F. H. Auld =

Deputy Minister of Agriculture
- In office 1916–1946

Personal details
- Born: Francis Hedley Auld; 14 June 1881 near Covehead, Prince Edward Island
- Died: 15 February 1967 (aged 85)
- Spouse: Elizabeth Smith
- Children: David Gordon Auld (born 1912); Walter Murray Auld (born 1916); Frank Mantle Auld (born 1918)
- Parent(s): David Higgins Auld; Elizabeth Cairns

Francis Hedley Auld, OBE (14 June 1881 – 15 February 1967) was a Canadian agricultural scientist who served as Saskatchewan's Deputy Minister of Agriculture from 1916 to 1946.

Auld was instrumental in increasing the province's farm production during his career in the civil service. He was also appointed Secretary for the Better Farming Commission (1920) and Secretary of the Royal Commission on Grain (1928).

== Biography ==
Auld was born in Prince Edward Island and attended Prince of Wales College at Charlottetown. Upon graduation in 1899, he taught public school briefly.

In 1902, aged 21, he moved to western Canada, intending to settle in Edmonton, Alberta. He visited his brother who taught in Abernethy, and met the Honourable W. R. Motherwell. A general store job did not last long, as Motherwell secured employment for him in the provincial government's Dairy Branch.

He married and had several children.

Auld was the first Director of Extension at the University of Saskatchewan (1910–1912). On 31 January 1911 Auld met with 42 women in Regina and the Saskatchewan Homemakers clubs were initiated. These clubs provided networking on homemaking, temperance issues, gardening, health, and poultry raising.

Auld returned to the province's civil service in 1914, rejoining the Provincial Department of Agriculture. In 1916, Auld became Deputy Minister of Agriculture, serving until 1946. He was elected to the University of Saskatchewan Senate in 1944. F. H. Auld was a member of the Saskatchewan Institute of Agrologists in 1946. He became the fifth Chancellor of the University of Saskatchewan. From 1950 to 1951 F.H. Auld was Grand Lodge of Saskatchewan, Ancient Free and Accepted Masons Past Grand Masters. Until 1966, Auld was a member of the Board of Governors of St. Andrew's College.

He died on 15 February 1967.

== Quotation ==
My personal opinion is that too many farmers are depending entirely upon grain farming. It is, of course, also true that present prices for live stock are rather discouraging, but it is my opinion also that the safest and surest means of successful farming is by diversifying to the greatest possible extent. A few cows, a few pigs, some hens with a variety of crops necessary to provide a good variety of feed for these various classes of live stock will provide the greatest measure of safety...(F.H. Auld to Thomas Rennie, East Anglia, Sask. December 3, 1920)

== Saskatchewan Archival Papers ==
The book A Capsule History Settling and Abandoning the Prairie Dry Belt by David C. Jones states that there are few records chronicling the drought years which began in Alberta in the 1920s. The papers of Deputy Minister of Agriculture F.H. Auld and other Saskatchewan ministers held in the Saskatchewan Archives help to understand municipal and village disintegration and debt relief programs for a succession of crop failures.

== Publications ==
- "Farmer's Institutes in the North-West Territories." by F. H. Auld. Saskatchewan History Magazine, 1957, vol. 10, no. 2, p. 41.

== Other awards ==
The University of Saskatchewan bestowed an Honorary Doctor of Laws degree on F. H. Auld in 1936.

Auld was initiated as a Fellow of the Agricultural Institute of Canada. The Most Excellent Order of the British Empire (OBE), which is a British order of chivalry, was bestowed upon him in 1946. In 1973 he was inducted into the Saskatchewan Agriculture Hall of Fame.

== See also ==
- Agriculture policy
- Agrology
- List of University of Saskatchewan alumni

== Notes ==
Academic offices
Preceded by Donald Maclean	Chancellor of the University of Saskatchewan; 1947–1965	Succeeded by E.M. Culliton
