= Arnold Tremere =

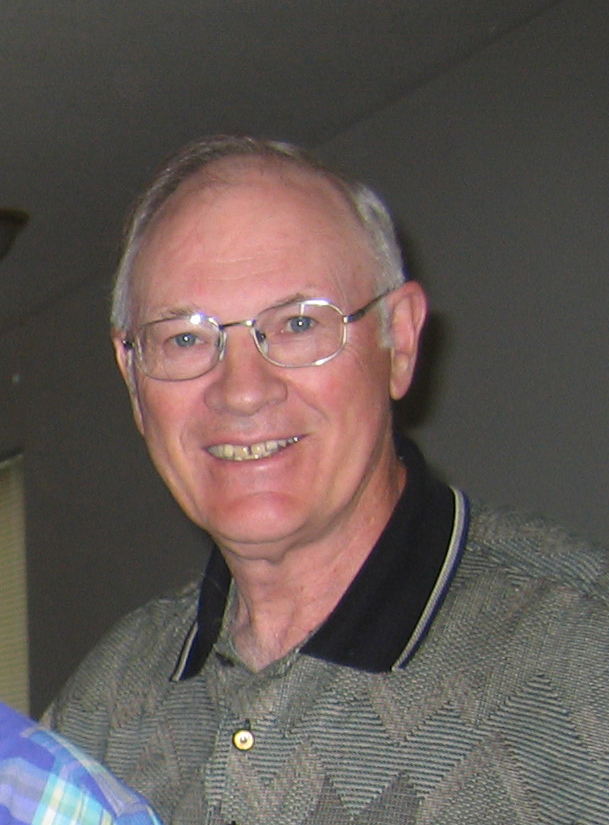
- Government Official (Canadian International Grains Institute)
- Born: April 14, 1941; Shaunavon, Saskatchewan, Canada
- Died: October 26, 2008 (aged 67); Medicine Hat, Alberta, Canada
- Occupation: Executive Director Government Official (Canadian International Grains Institute)
- Spouse: Marcella Tremere
- Children: Evelyn, Liisa
- Parent(s): Ruth and Leslie Tremere

Arnold Tremere (April 14, 1941 – October 26, 2008) was appointed as the Canadian International Grains Institute first director of Feed and Technology from May 1982 to October 1989, and subsequently was promoted to the position of Executive Director, the highest non-partisan position within the field of Agriculture in the Canadian government, where he served during the adoption of the North American Free Trade Agreement (NAFTA) in 1989 and signing of the agreement in 1994.

== Early life and education ==
Tremere was born in Shaunavon, Saskatchewan and raised on the Les Tremere family homestead located in Scotsguard, Saskatchewan. Leslie Albert Tremere was born in Boston, Mass. on March 11, 1898, and Ruth was born in Esmond, North Dakota, on June 6, 1910. His father's side, the Les Tremere family, is one of only 52 related Tremere families in North America. Tremere families originate from a line in Lanviet, England. His mother's family was Swedish from the region near Algaras. He attended school in Austinville, Scotsguard and graduated from Shaunavon High School. Tremere married Marcella, also of Shaunavon, SK on August 7, 1962. He attended the University of Saskatchewan (U of S) where he attained his Bachelor of Science in Agriculture in 1962 with Distinction and Master of Science Degree in 1964. While in attendance at the U of S he received the National Research Council Fellowship, two National Research Council Awards and the Agriculture Foundation Scholarship. He was awarded his Ph.D. in 1968 from Cornell University, Ithaca, New York.

== Career ==
In his early career, Tremere was employed as a Nutritionist and Director of Nutrition and Research in the Agriculture division at Maple Leaf Mills in Toronto for 12 years. He subsequently was the General Manager of Maple Leaf Mills, Western Region, for three years. Following this period in industry, Tremere took his first position with the Canadian government in 1982 as the first director of the Feed and Technology division. In 1989 he became Director of the Canadian International Grains Institute until 2002.

Tremere, was appointed as the Canadian International Grains Institute First Director of Feed and Technology from May 1982 to October 1989, and subsequently was promoted to the position of Executive Director, the highest non-partisan position within the field of Agriculture in the Canadian government. He took over the position from Dennis Stephens. Tremere held this position from 1989 until his retirement in 2002. Barry Senft assumed the role of Executive Director with C.I.G.I. in 2002.

In his capacity as Director, Tremere represented the Canadian Grain Industry's educational and support services to 70 countries in Analytical Services, Baking Technology, Biofuel Technology, Feed Technology, Milling Technology, Noodle and Asian products, Pasta technology, Pulse processing and specialty mill. Tremere's time as Director was particularly tumultuous. The major defining events during his period as Director included the advent of NAFTA in 1989 and signing of the agreement in 1994. New technologies in farm equipment and grain handling, including GPS (global positioning systems) and the introduction of "Super-Elevators", dramatically changed the day to day experience of Canadian grain producers. In the face of great challenges to preserve their way of life, many Canadian agriculture producers picketed and protested any and all governmental sites where business related to agriculture was conducted at the Federal level including C.I.G.I headquarters in downtown Winnipeg, MB. In the early nineteen nineties, a rift was formed between the usually amicable American and Canadian agriculture sectors. The level of Canadian grain that was exported to the US suggested the possibility of an unfair trading advantage to the benefit of the Canadian farmers, a claim that later was shown be to unsubstantiated. By 2002, the face of Canadian agriculture had changed considerably from what had existed in the 1980s. Most Canadian agricultural producers were now diversifying away from the traditional crops of wheat, oats and barley to include a much higher percentage of oilseed and specialty crops. These changes called for an expansion of the services and technical areas of support at C.I.G.I. Specifically, in the area of technical services and support a new emphasis had been placed on understanding the consumer needs of the Asian market leading to many large scale tours in Western Canada offered and coordinated, under Tremere's direction, by "the Institute" for Asian agriculture representatives as well as the addition of the instant noodle manufacturing capacity at the C.I.G.I. site located in Winnipeg, MB.

Tremere retired to Medicine Hat, Alberta Canada, as a consultant for Stiltscorp, where he remained until his death in October 2008.

== See also ==
- List of Cornell University people - Business - Chairpersons, CEO's, Executives
- List of University of Saskatchewan alumni
- Maple Leaf Foods
- Medicine Hat Famous hatters
