= Hugh James Maher =

Canadian politician

Hugh James Maher (October 5, 1910 – May 11, 2001) was a real estate and insurance agent and political figure in Saskatchewan. He represented The Battlefords from 1950 to 1952 in the Legislative Assembly of Saskatchewan as a Liberal.

He was born in North Battleford, Saskatchewan, the son of Hugh Maher and Josephine Ann Hayes, and was educated there and in Saskatoon. In 1935, Maher married Florence Andrea Showell. He was a member of the separate school board and of the town council for North Battleford, also serving 18 years as mayor. In 1963, Maher ran unsuccessfully as a Liberal candidate seeking to represent The Battlefords in the Canadian House of Commons.
