= Reginald John Godfrey Bateman =

Canadian academic

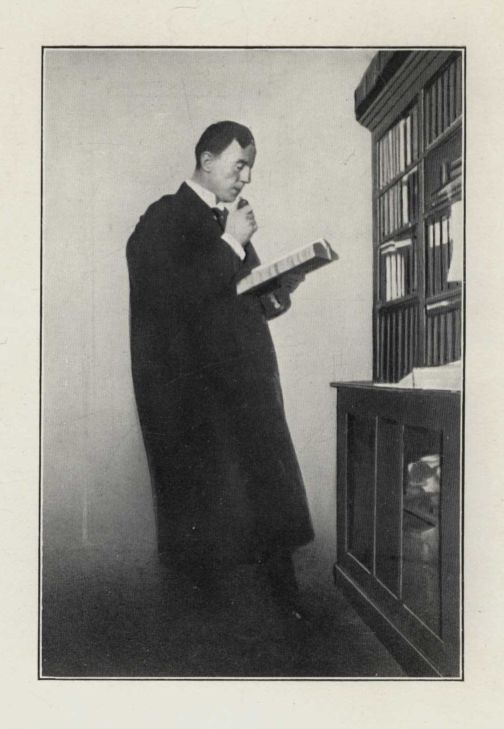
- Born: 12 October 1883; Ireland
- Died: 3 September 1918
- Occupation: professor of English

Reginald John Godfrey Bateman, Master of Arts of Dublin (12 October 1883 – 3 September 1918) was a professor of English at the University of Saskatchewan and an army officer during World War I.

Bateman was born and educated in Ireland and, in 1909, he became one of the first four professors at the University of Saskatchewan in Saskatoon and its first professor of English.

== Works ==
Reginald Bateman, Teacher and soldier: A memorial volume of selections from his lectures and other writings. Saskatoon: University of Saskatchewan, 1922, xi, 147.
