= Prince Albert Court House =

Historic building in Saskatchewan, Canada

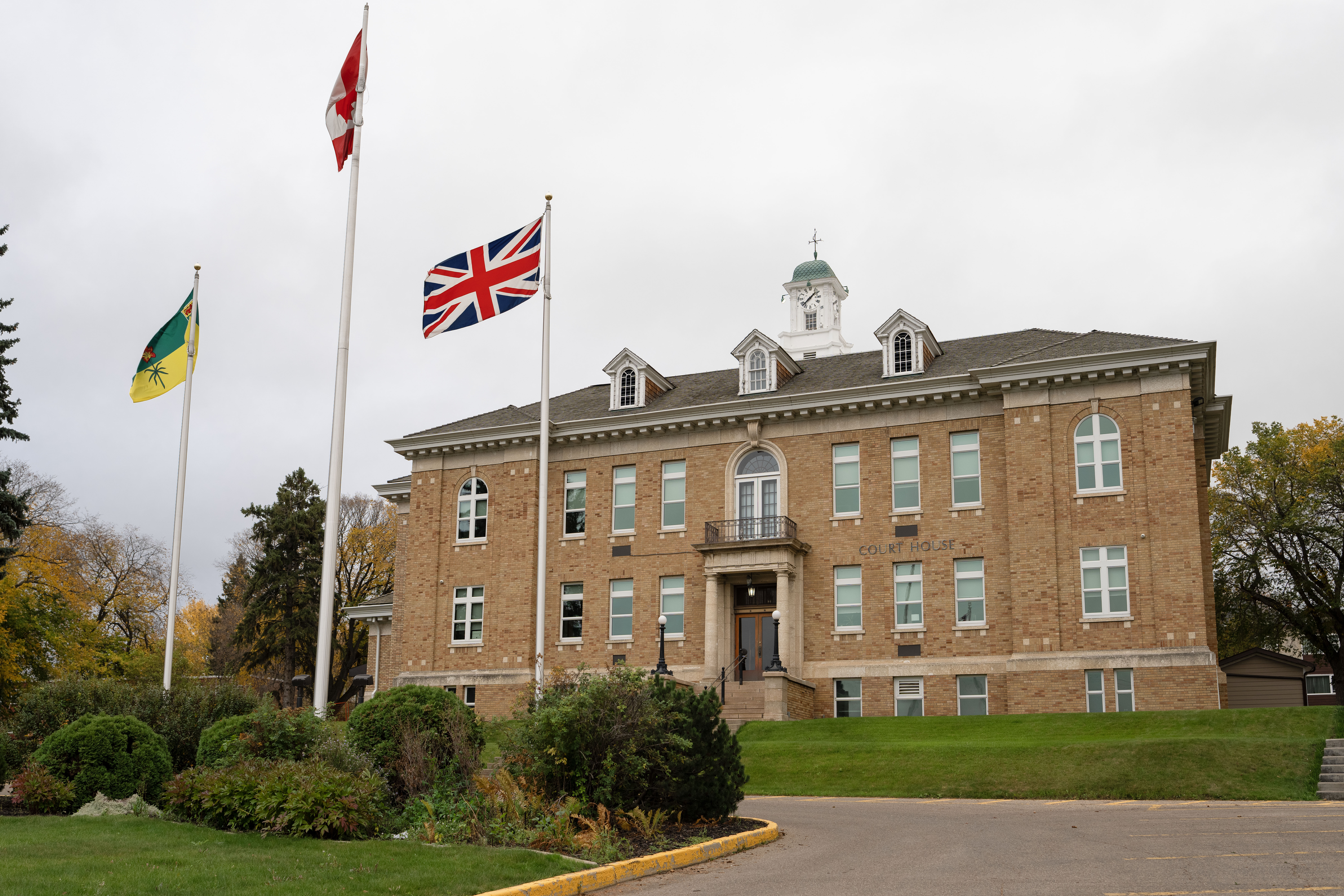
- The building in 2025

- Location in Saskatchewan

General information
- Location: 1800 Central Avenue, Prince Albert, Saskatchewan, Canada
- Coordinates: 53.20349°N 105.75309°W
- Current tenants: Court of King's Bench for Saskatchewan
- Opened: 1927
- Owner: Government of Saskatchewan

Design and construction
- Architect: Maurice William Sharon

The Prince Albert Court House is a courthouse located at 1800 Central Avenue in Prince Albert, Saskatchewan, Canada. It serves as a location of the Court of King's Bench for Saskatchewan.

Built in 1926, the red-brick structure was designed by provincial architect Maurice W. Sharon under the Office of the Provincial Architect. The building reflects a modest Colonial Revival style, featuring symmetrical massing, a columned main entrance, and a central clock tower. It has remained in continuous use as a courthouse since its opening in 1927.

In 2023, a restoration project received a municipal heritage award for preserving the building's original windows and exterior details.

== See also ==
- Court of King's Bench for Saskatchewan
- History of Saskatchewan Courts
