= Permanand Mohan =

Computer Science Lecturer

Permanand Mohan at The Fourth Pan-Commonwealth Forum, Ocho Rios, Jamaica (2006)

Permanand Mohan is a senior Computer Science lecturer at the University of the West Indies, St. Augustine Campus, Trinidad and Tobago. He holds a Ph.D. in computer science from the University of the West Indies, an M.Sc. in computer science from the University of Saskatchewan and a B.Sc. in computer science from the University of the West Indies. He is the Chief Examiner for the Caribbean Examinations Council’s CAPE Examinations in Computer Science.

== Biography ==
Permanand Mohan was born on March 20, 1965, in Gran Couva, Trinidad and Tobago. In 1989 he received a Commonwealth Scholarship to study at the University of Saskatchewan. In 2003 he was a Fulbright Visiting Scholar to the School of Information Sciences at the University of Pittsburgh as well as visiting professor at the Laboratory for Advanced Research in Intelligent Educational Systems (ARIES) at the University of Saskatchewan in Canada.

== Research ==
His research interests lie in the field of artificial intelligence and education, and the use of learning objects in e-learning. 2006 marked his entry into the field of m-learning with a publication at The Fourth Pan-Commonwealth Forum
