= Victor Zaleschuk =

Victor J. Zaleschuk, a corporate director, is the chair of the board of Cameco Corporation. He is the former president and chief executive officer of Nexen Inc. (a publicly traded independent global energy and chemicals company). He currently serves on the board of the following publicly traded companies: Nexen Inc. and Agrium Inc. (a global producer and marketer of agricultural nutrients and industrial products). Mr. Zaleschuk is a chartered accountant and holds a Bachelor of Commerce degree from the University of Saskatchewan.
