= Darin Nesbitt =

Darin Nesbitt is an instructor of Political Science at Douglas College, in New Westminster, British Columbia, Canada.

He graduated with his Bachelor of Arts Degree from the University of Saskatchewan in 1989, and received his Master of Arts Degree in 1990 from the same university. His M.A. thesis is entitled The Individual and Liberty: The Coherence of John Locke's Thought. He was granted a Ph.D. in political science from the University of Alberta in 1997. His thesis in fulfillment of the requirements for the degree of Doctor of Philosophy is A Liberal Theory of Virtue and the Good: The Moral and Political Thought of T.H. Green.

Nesbitt has since authored a number of conference papers, reviewed books, peer reviewed academic articles, and published in academic journals such as Polity and Paideusis. His principal research interests revolve around British Idealism, particularly the late nineteenth-century thinkers Thomas Hill Green and David George Ritchie. His academic publications examine topics such as individual rights, property rights, ethics, and democracy and education.

In addition to teaching political science at Douglas College, Nesbitt has been active in the British Columbia college community system. He was elected secretary-treasurer of the Douglas College Faculty Association and assumed the chair of its Operations and Finance Committee. He also served as the chair of the British Columbia Political Science Articulation Committee.. Nesbitt was the recipient of a Provincially Initiated Curriculum grant to design an on-line course.

== Scholarly articles and book chapters ==
- "Autonomy, Rights, and Euthanasia Policy: Lessons from John Stuart Mill" in David McGrane and Neil Hibbert (eds.) Applied Political Theory and Canadian Politics. Toronto: University of Toronto Press, 2019: 169–192.
- "D. G. Ritchie’s Ethics" in William Sweet (ed.) The Moral and Social Philosophy of the British Idealists. Exeter: Imprint Academic, 2009: 65-86
- "Democratic Paradoxes: Thomas Hill Green on Education" (co-authored with Elizabeth Trott) in Paideusis Vol.15, No.2 (2006): 61–78.
- "T. H. Green on Property Rights" in D. J. C. Carmichael (ed.) From Philosophy to Politics. 2005: 213–245.
- "Recognizing Rights: Social Recognition in T. H. Green’s System of Rights" in Polity Vol.33, No.3 (Spring 2001): 423–437.

== Reviews ==
- "Liberty, Equality, and Plurality" by Larry May, Christine Sistare, and Jonathan Schonsheck, (eds.) in Ethics (April 2000).
- "Hypocrisy and Integrity: Machiavelli, Rousseau, and the Ethics of Politics" by Ruth W. Grant in Philosophy in Review/Comptes rendus philosophiques (February 1998).
- "Perfect Equality: John Stuart Mill on Well-Constituted Communities" by Maria Morales in Ethics (January 1998).
- "Arendt and Heidegger: The Fate of the Political" by Dana. R. Villa in Humanities and Social Sciences Online (August 1997).

== Personal Information ==
Nesbitt was born in Saskatoon, Saskatchewan, Canada. The youngest of two sons, his parents are James (a firefighter) and Sheila (née Serack). Nesbitt attended Lorne Haselton school and Walter Murray Collegiate.
