= Constance Hunt =

Canadian lawyer, legal academic, and judge

- Born: Constance Darlene Hunt; 11 January 1950 (age 75); Yorkton, Saskatchewan, Canada
- Occupation(s): lawyer, legal academic, and judge

Constance Darlene Hunt (born 11 January 1950) is a Canadian lawyer, legal academic, and judge. Born in Yorkton, Saskatchewan, she received a Bachelor of Arts degree in 1970 and a Bachelor of Law degree in 1972 from the University of Saskatchewan. In 1976, she received a Master of Law degree from Harvard University.

From 1973 to 1976, she was a counsel with Inuit Tapiriit Kanatami, the national Inuit organization in Canada. From 1976 to 1991, she was an associate professor and professor of law at the University of Calgary, part of the Canadian Institute of Resources Law (CIRL) at Calgary. From 1981 to 1983, she was counsel for Mobil Oil Canada. From 1989 to 1991, she was the dean of the faculty of law at the University of Calgary.

She was appointed to the Court of Queen's Bench in 1991 and to the Court of Appeal of Alberta in 1995. In 1999, she was appointed a judge of Nunavut's Court of Appeal. In 2006, it was reported that she was one of three "short list" candidates recommended to be appointed to the Supreme Court of Canada replacing the retired justice, John C. Major. She retired from the court on August 31, 2014.

Hunt is bilingual, and has heard cases in French at the Court of Appeal. In 2013, Hunt was listed^{[usurped]} as a NAFTA adjudicator.

== Links ==
- "Canadian Who's Who 1997 entry".
