= E. M. Culliton =

Canadian politician

Edward Milton Culliton

Chief Justice of Saskatchewan
- In office 1962–1981
- Preceded by: Emmett Matthew Hall
- Succeeded by: Edward Bayda

Personal details
- Born: April 9, 1906 East Grand Forks, Minnesota
- Died: March 14, 1991 (aged 84)
- Spouse: Katharine Hector
- Education: University of Saskatchewan
- Profession: Judge, lawyer

Edward Milton Culliton, CC SOM (April 9, 1906 – March 14, 1991) was a member of Legislative Assembly of Saskatchewan and Chief Justice of Saskatchewan.

Born in East Grand Forks, Minnesota, he grew up in Elbow, Saskatchewan, and earned an arts degree from the University of Saskatchewan in 1926 and a law degree in 1928.

In 1935, he was elected as a Liberal Member of the Saskatchewan Legislature representing the constituency of Gravelbourg and was re-elected in 1938. He served as Provincial Secretary from 1938 to 1941. In 1941, Culliton resigned to serve with the Canadian Army. He retained his seat in the legislature as a Minister without portfolio. During his absence, the Liberal administration was defeated by the C.C.F. in 1944. Returning from the war, he returned to his law practice. He ran for the leadership of the Liberal party in 1946, losing to Walter A. Tucker. He was elected again in 1948 as an MLA. From 1951 to 1962 he was a Justice of the Saskatchewan Court of Appeal and from 1962 until 1981 was Chief Justice of Saskatchewan. From 1965 to 1968, he was Chancellor of the University of Saskatchewan.

Culliton is regarded as one of the great "what-might have-beens" of Saskatchewan politics. After the election of the social democratic Co-operative Commonwealth Federation (North America's first socialist government) in the 1944 provincial election, Liberal leader William John Patterson resigned. Walter Adam Tucker won the leadership over the urbane Culliton, a moderate who could have well appealed better to voters during subsequent elections. Culliton left politics and chaired the committee overseeing the province's 50th anniversary celebration in 1955. As a judge, he articulated the four factors to be considered in sentencing: deterrence, rehabilitation, punishment and protection of the public.

In 1981, he was made a Companion of the Order of Canada. In 1988, he was awarded the Saskatchewan Order of Merit. He was made a Knight Commander of the Order of St. Gregory the Great by Pope Paul VI in 1973. In 1974, he was inducted as a builder into the Canadian Curling Hall of Fame.

In 1939, he married Katharine Hector.

Academic offices
Preceded by F. H. Auld	Chancellor of the University of Saskatchewan; 1965–1969	Succeeded by John Diefenbaker
