= Court of Appeal for Saskatchewan =

Highest appellate court in Saskatchewan, Canada

- Coat of arms of Saskatchewan
- Established: 1918
- Jurisdiction: Saskatchewan, Canada
- Location: Regina, with regular sittings in Saskatoon
- Authorized by: The Court of Appeal Act, 2000
- Appeals to: Supreme Court of Canada
- Number of positions: 8
- Website: Court of Appeal

Chief Justice
- Currently: Robert Leurer
- Since: October 6, 2023

The Court of Appeal for Saskatchewan (SKCA) is a Canadian appellate court.

== Jurisdiction and structure ==
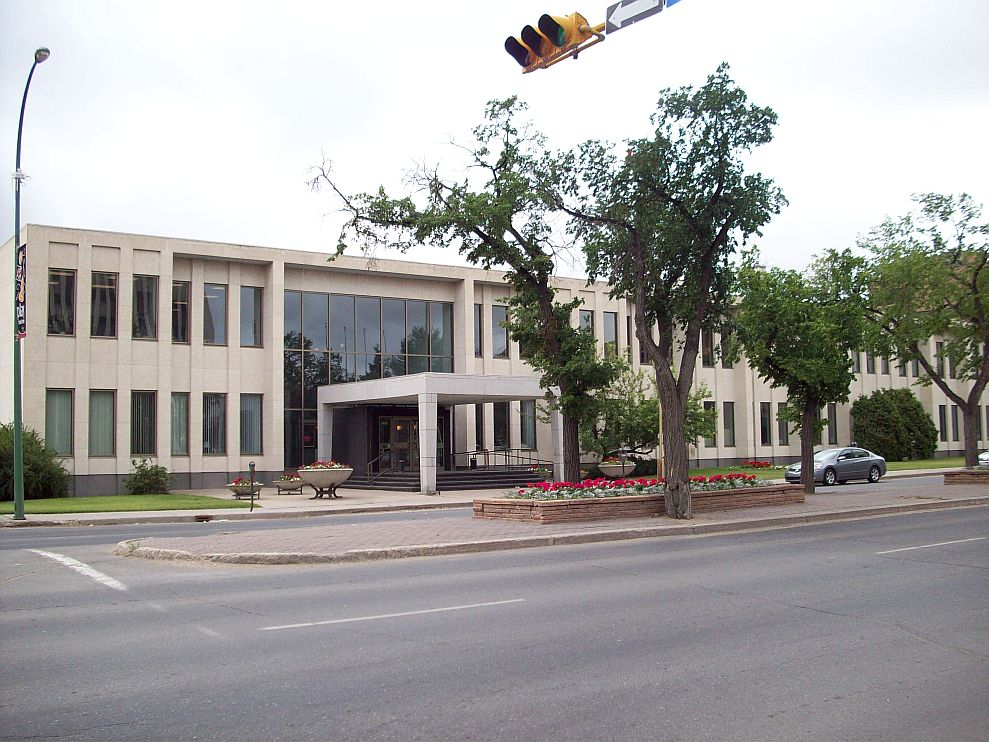
Regina Court House

The Saskatchewan Court of Appeal is the highest court in the province of Saskatchewan, Canada. The Court consists of eight full time judges, including the Chief Justice - styled Chief Justice of Saskatchewan. At any given time there may be one or more additional justice siting as supernumerary justices. Justices of the Saskatchewan Court of Appeal are appointed and paid by the federal government.

The Court is governed by The Court of Appeal Act, 2000, which sets out the composition and jurisdiction of the Court. It hears appeals from the Court of King's Bench for Saskatchewan, the Provincial Court of Saskatchewan and a number of administrative tribunals. The Court is based in Regina, Saskatchewan and sittings are regularly scheduled in Saskatoon.

Most cases are heard by a panel of three justices, however, the Court sits with panels of five or seven from time to time, depending on the appeal. A single justice will preside over matters heard in chambers, usually interlocutory matters or applications for leave to appeal.

=== Original jurisdiction ===
The Court has a limited original jurisdiction, giving it the discretion to grant relief by way of a prerogative writ. The Court has held that since it is primarily a court of appeal, it will only entertain original applications for prerogative relief in extraordinary circumstances. It also has any original jurisdiction that is necessary or incidental to the hearing and determination of an appeal.

=== Reference jurisdiction ===
Under The Constitutional Questions Act, the Government of Saskatchewan has the authority to refer questions of law to the Court of Appeal for the Court's advisory opinion.

== History of the Court ==
The Court of Appeal was created on March 1, 1918, upon the coming into force of The Court of Appeal Act of 1915. Prior to that date, there was a single superior court for Saskatchewan, known as the Supreme Court of Saskatchewan, which had both appellate and trial jurisdiction. Individual members of the Supreme Court sat as trial judges, while the full Supreme Court Court (also known at the Supreme Court en banc) heard appeals. The 1915 legislation split the appellate functions and the trial functions. The new Court of Appeal was established to take over the appellate function of the Supreme Court of Saskatchewan, and the new Court of King's Bench was created to take over the trial functions of the Supreme Court of Saskatchewan. The Supreme Court of Saskatchewan was abolished effective March 1, 1918.

== Appeals to the Supreme Court ==
Appeals may be taken from the Court of Appeal to the Supreme Court of Canada either by right, by leave of the Supreme Court of Canada, or by leave of the Court of Appeal itself, depending on the nature of the case. Until 1949 appeals could further be taken from the Supreme Court of Canada to the Judicial Committee of the Privy Council in the United Kingdom. Appeals could also be taken directly from the Court of Appeal to the Privy Council.

== Justices of the Court ==
=== Current justices ===
The current justices of the Court are:

Name	Appointed	Nominated By	Position prior to appointment
Chief Justice Robert W. Leurer	2018; 2023	J. Trudeau	Court of Queen's Bench
Justice Neal W. Caldwell	2010	Harper	Lawyer at McDougall, Gauley LLP
Justice Jerome Tholl	2019	J. Trudeau	Court of Queen's Bench
Justice Jeffery Kalmakoff	2019	J. Trudeau	Court of Queen's Bench
Justice Meghan McCreary	2022	J. Trudeau	Court of Queen's Bench
Justice Jillyne Drennan	2022	J. Trudeau	Court of King's Bench
Justice Naheed Bardai	2024	J. Trudeau	Court of King's Bench
Justice Keith Kilback	2024	J. Trudeau	Court of King's Bench

Supernumerary

Name	Appointed	Nominated By	Position Prior to Appointment
Justice Georgina R. Jackson	1991	Mulroney	Lawyer at MacPherson Leslie and Tyerman
Justice Lian M. Schwann	2017	J. Trudeau	Court of Queen's Bench

=== Former justices ===
==== Former Chief Justices of Saskatchewan ====
- The Honourable E. L. Wetmore (1907–1912)
- The Honourable Fredrick W. A. G. Haultain (1912–1938)
- The Honourable William F. A. Turgeon (1938–1941)
- The Honourable William M. Martin (1941–1961)
- The Honourable Emmett M. Hall (1961–1962)**
- The Honourable Edward M. Culliton (1962–1981)
- The Honourable Edward D. Bayda (1981–2006)
- The Honourable John Klebuc (2006–2013)
- The Honourable Robert G. Richards (2013–2023)

==== Former justices of the Court of Appeal ====
- The Honourable John H. Lamont (1918–1927)**
- The Honourable Edward L. Elwood (1918–1921)
- The Honourable Henry William Newlands (1918–1921)
- The Honourable James McKay (1921–1932)
- The Honourable William F. A. Turgeon (1921–1938)*
- The Honourable William M. Martin (1922–1941)*
- The Honourable Phillip E. MacKenzie (1927–1946)
- The Honourable Percival H. Gordon (1935–1961)
- The Honourable Thomas Clayton Davis (1939–1948)
- The Honourable Hector Y. MacDonald (1941–1951)
- The Honourable Edward M. Culliton (1951–1962)*
- The Honourable Percy M. Anderson (1946–1948)
- The Honourable Arthur Thomas Procter (1948–1961)
- The Honourable Donald A. McNiven (1949–1961)
- The Honourable Percy H. Maguire (1962–1974)
- The Honourable Edward D. Bayda (1974–1981)*
- The Honourable Mervyn J. Woods (1961–1984)
- The Honourable Roy N. Hall (1962–1989)
- The Honourable Russell Brownridge (1961–1988)
- The Honourable Raymond A. MacDonald (1981–1984)
- The Honourable Thomas C. Wakeling (1984–2000)
- The Honourable Calvin F. Tallis (1981–2005)
- The Honourable Ysanne G.K. Wilkinson (2007-2009)
- The Honourable Darla C. Hunter (2007–2010)
- The Honourable Nicholas W. Sherstobitoff (1985–2010)
- The Honourable Gene Anne Smith (2005-2013)
- The Honourable William J. Vancise (1983-2013)
- The Honourable Marjorie A. Gerwing (1984-2013)
- The Honourable Stuart J. Cameron (1981-2014)
- The Honourable John Klebuc (2013-2015)*
- The Honourable J. Gary Lane (1991-2017)
- The Honourable Maurice Herauf (2011-2018)
- The Honourable Ralph K. Ottenbreit (2009-2022)
- The Honourable Jacelyn A. Ryan-Froslie (2013-2022)
- The Honourable Peter A. Whitmore (2013-2022)

An asterisk indicates the individual also served as Chief Justice of Saskatchewan; a double asterisk indicates subsequently appointed to the Supreme Court of Canada.

== Courts of Saskatchewan ==
There are three main courts in Saskatchewan:

- Court of Appeal for Saskatchewan – appellate court; highest court of Saskatchewan.
- Court of King's Bench for Saskatchewan – superior trial court of Saskatchewan with inherent and general jurisdiction
- Provincial Court of Saskatchewan – court of first instance; trial court with jurisdiction defined by statute
