= Provincial Court of Saskatchewan =

- Established: 1978
- Jurisdiction: Saskatchewan
- Authorised by: The Provincial Court Act, 1998
- Number of positions: 49
- Website: Provincial Court

Chief Judge
- Currently: Shannon Metivier
- Since: March 1, 2021

The Provincial Court of Saskatchewan is the provincial court of record for the province of Saskatchewan. It hears matters relating to criminal law, youth law, civil law, family law, traffic law and municipal bylaws.

== Jurisdiction ==
The Provincial Court is a creation of statute, and as such its jurisdiction is limited to those matters permitted by statute. It has no inherent jurisdiction, other than to the limited degree in which it may control its own procedures.

In criminal matters, it is a trial court for all summary conviction offences. For indictable criminal offences, it can be a trial court if an accused person elects to have his or her trial in that court. When an accused charged with an indictable offence elects trial by a superior court (the Saskatchewan Court of King's Bench), the preliminary inquiry will be held in the Provincial Court. The Provincial Court is also designated as the Youth Justice Court under the Youth Criminal Justice Act of Canada.

In civil matters, the Small Claims division of the court is limited to claims for up to $30,000. The Provincial Court also has limited family law jurisdiction, except for divorce proceedings and the division of matrimonial property.

== Judges of the Court ==
The Court is composed of the Chief Judge and 48 other judges. The judges are appointed by the provincial government. To be eligible for appointment, a person must have at least 10 years' experience as a lawyer, or have other legal experience which is satisfactory to the Judicial Council of Saskatchewan. Once appointed, judges are independent of the government, and can only be removed from office following the procedure set out in the Act. The judges serve until age 65, although the Chief Judge may grant an extension up to age 70.

=== Current Judges ===
| Name | Location | Date Appointed | Appointed By | Prior Position(s) |
|---|---|---|---|---|
| Chief Judge J. A. Plemel | | | | |
| Associate Chief Judge M. J. Hinds | Regina | | | |
| Judge S. Anand (Administrative Judge) | Saskatoon | | | |
| Judge M. T. Beaton (Administrative Judge) | Regina | | | |
| Judge B. Bauer (Administrative Judge for Northwest Region) | North Battleford | | | |
| Judge B. D. Henning (Administrative Judge for Facilities and Security) | Regina | | | |
| Judge E. Kalenith (Administrative Judge) | Prince Albert | | | |
| Judge Q. D. Agnew | Saskatoon | | | |
| Judge M. Baldwin | Meadow Lake | | | |
| Judge M. M. Baniak | Saskatoon | | | |
| Judge K. P. Bazin | Swift Current | | | |
| Judge I. J. Cardinal | Melfort | | | |
| Judge A. M. Crugnale-Reid | Regina | | | |
| Judge P. Demong | Regina | | | |
| Judge F. M. A. L. Daunt | Prince Albert | | | |
| Judge L. D. Dyck | North Battleford | | | |
| Judge M. Gray | Saskatoon | | | |
| Judge R. Green | Yorkton | | | |
| Judge L. A. Halliday | Regina | | | |
| Judge H. M. Harradence | Prince Albert | | | |
| Judge R. D. Jackson | Saskatoon | | | |
| Judge B. M. Klause | Saskatoon | | | |
| Judge P. R. Koskie | Yorkton | | | |
| Judge D. J. Kovatch | Moose Jaw | | | |
| Judge R. Lane | Prince Albert | | | |
| Judge K.A. Lang | Regina | | | |
| Judge R. Mackenzie | La Ronge | | | |
| Judge M. Marquette | Wynyard | | | |
| Judge M. F. Martinez | Meadow Lake | | | |
| Judge J. E. McIvor | Meadow Lake | | | |
| Judge S. Metivier | Saskatoon | | | |
| Judge V. Monar Enweani | Saskatoon | | | |
| Judge G. M. Morin | Prince Albert | | | |
| Judge B. G. Morgan | Saskatoon | | | |
| Judge M. Penner | Saskatoon | | | |
| Judge D. J. O'Hanlon | North Battleford | | | |
| Judge D. Rayner | Moose Jaw | | | |
| Judge P.A. Reis | Regina | | | |
| Judge S. I. Robinson | La Ronge | | | |
| Judge J.F. Rybchuk | Regina | | | |
| Judge S. Schiefner | Prince Albert | | | |
| Judge D. C. Scott | Saskatoon | | | |
| Judge L. Stang | Melfort | | | |
| Judge D. Taylor | Yorkton | | | |
| Judge M. Tomka | Swift Current | | | |
| Judge L. Wiegers | Estevan | | | |
| Judge B. Wright | Saskatoon | | | |
| Judge K. J. Young | Lloydminster | | | |

== Sittings of the Court ==
The Provincial Courts has permanent offices in 13 towns and cities: Estevan, La Ronge, Lloydminster, Meadow Lake, Melfort, Moose Jaw, North Battleford, Prince Albert, Regina, Saskatoon, Swift Current, Wynyard and Yorkton. The Court also sits in almost 70 smaller centres across the province. Judges of the Provincial Court are addressed as "Your Honour", or "His/Her Honour".

== History ==
The Provincial Court superseded the former Magistrate's Court, at which time the stipendiary magistrates were replaced by qualified lawyers.

== Courts of Saskatchewan ==
There are three main courts in Saskatchewan:

- Court of Appeal for Saskatchewan – appellate court; highest court of Saskatchewan.
- Court of King's Bench for Saskatchewan – superior trial court of Saskatchewan with inherent and general jurisdiction
- Provincial Court of Saskatchewan – court of first instance; trial court with jurisdiction defined by statute
