= Robert G. Richards =

Retired Chief Justice of Saskatchewan

Robert G. Richards is a former Chief Justice of Saskatchewan, Canada. He was appointed in June 2013 and served as Chief Justice of Saskatchewan until 2023. Richards earned a Bachelor of Commerce (1975) and a Bachelor of Laws (1979) from the University of Saskatchewan, and obtained a Master of Laws from Harvard Law School in 1982. He was admitted to the Bar of Ontario in 1983 and the Bar of Saskatchewan in 1985.

Richards was a law clerk at the Supreme Court of Canada (1979–80) and a parliamentary intern at the House of Commons (1980–81). He practiced law at Gowling and Henderson (1982–84) and then served as Chief of Staff for the Rt. Hon. Ramon Hnatyshyn (1984–85). Richards was Director of Constitutional Law for the Saskatchewan Department of Justice (1985–90) and a partner with MacPherson Leslie & Tyerman in Regina from 1990 to 2004, when he was appointed to the Court of Appeal for Saskatchewan. Prior to his appointment, Richards was counsel in more than 40 Supreme Court of Canada appeals.

Richards has been a director of the Canadian Institute for Advanced Legal Studies and a council member of the International Commission of Jurists (Canadian Section). He has chaired the Supreme Court of Canada-Canadian Bar Association (CBA) Liaison Committee and acted as co-chair of the national CBA Constitutional and Human Rights Law section.

Richards chairs the Saskatchewan Provincial Court Judicial Council and is the First Vice Chair of the Canadian Judicial Council, where he chairs the salary and benefits committee.

On March 17, 2023, Richards announced that he would retire from the Court of Appeal effective August 31, 2023.
