= Edward Bayda =

Chief Justice of Saskatchewan, Canada (1931–2010)

Chief Justice of Saskatchewan
- In office 1981–2006
- Preceded by: E. M. Culliton
- Succeeded by: John Klebuc

Personal details
- Born: September 9, 1931 Alvena, Canada
- Died: April 2, 2010 (aged 78) İzmir, Turkey
- Education: University of Saskatchewan

Edward Bayda (September 9, 1931 – April 2, 2010) was the Chief Justice of Saskatchewan, Canada and Chief Justice of the Province's Court of Appeal.

== Early life ==
Edward Bayda was born in Alvena, Saskatchewan. He attended the University of Saskatchewan, where he received a B.A. in 1951 and an LL.B. in 1953.

== Jury ==
After nearly twenty years of law practice, he was appointed to the Queen's Bench in 1972 and the Court of Appeal in 1974. He became Chief Justice of Saskatchewan in 1981 and retired in September 2006.

== Death ==
Bayda died in İzmir, Turkey on April 2, 2010, at the age of 78.
