= Court of King's Bench for Saskatchewan =

Canadian trial court

- Location: Battleford; Estevan; Melfort; Moose Jaw; Prince Albert; Regina; Saskatoon; Swift Current; Weyburn; and Yorkton
- Authorised by: The Queen's Bench Act, 1998
- Number of positions: 33
- Website: Court of King's Bench

Chief Justice
- Currently: Martel D. Popescul
- Since: January 1, 2012

The Court of King's Bench for Saskatchewan (Court of Queen's Bench for Saskatchewan during the reign of female monarchs) is the superior trial court for the Canadian province of Saskatchewan.

== Structure and organization ==
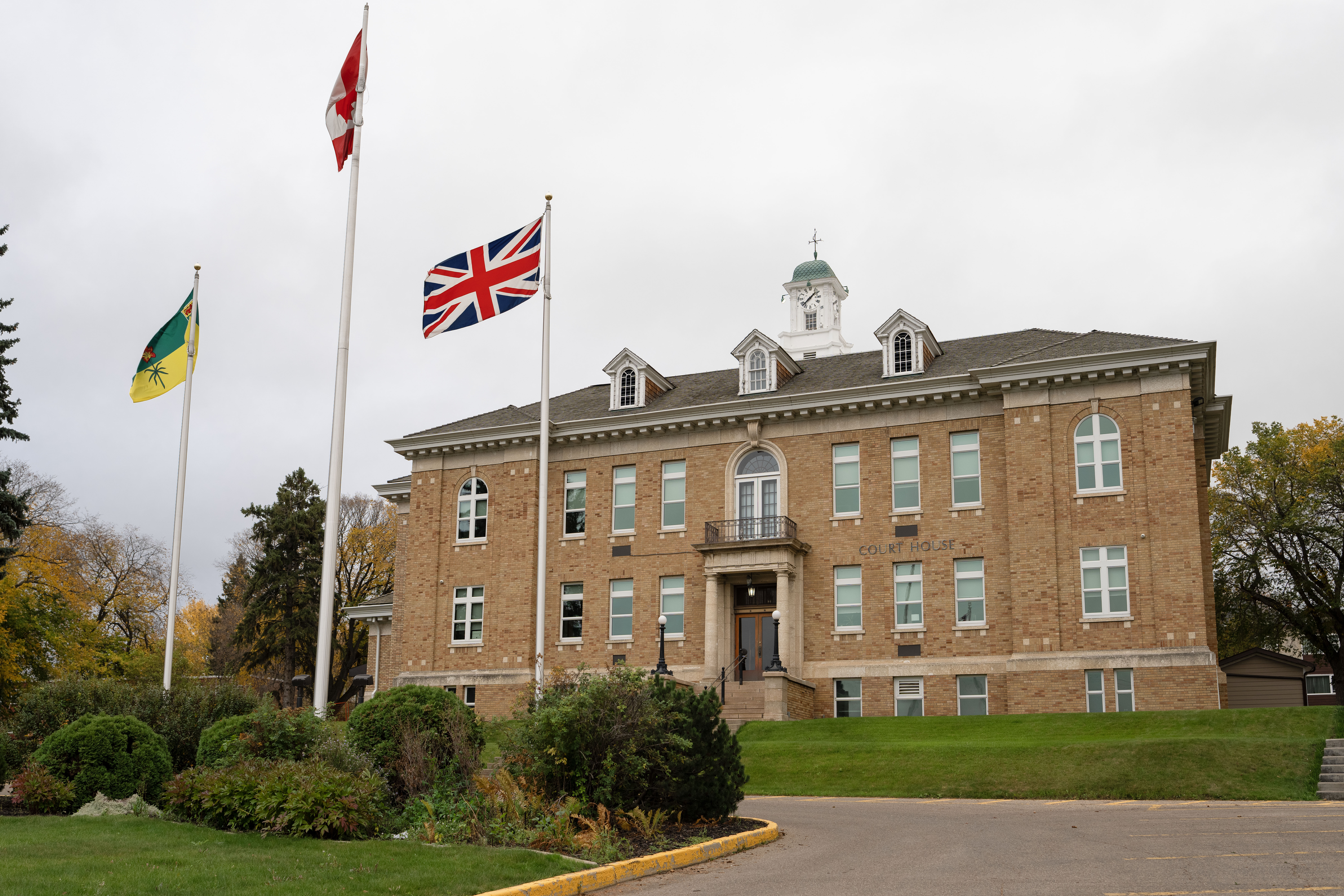
Prince Albert Court House

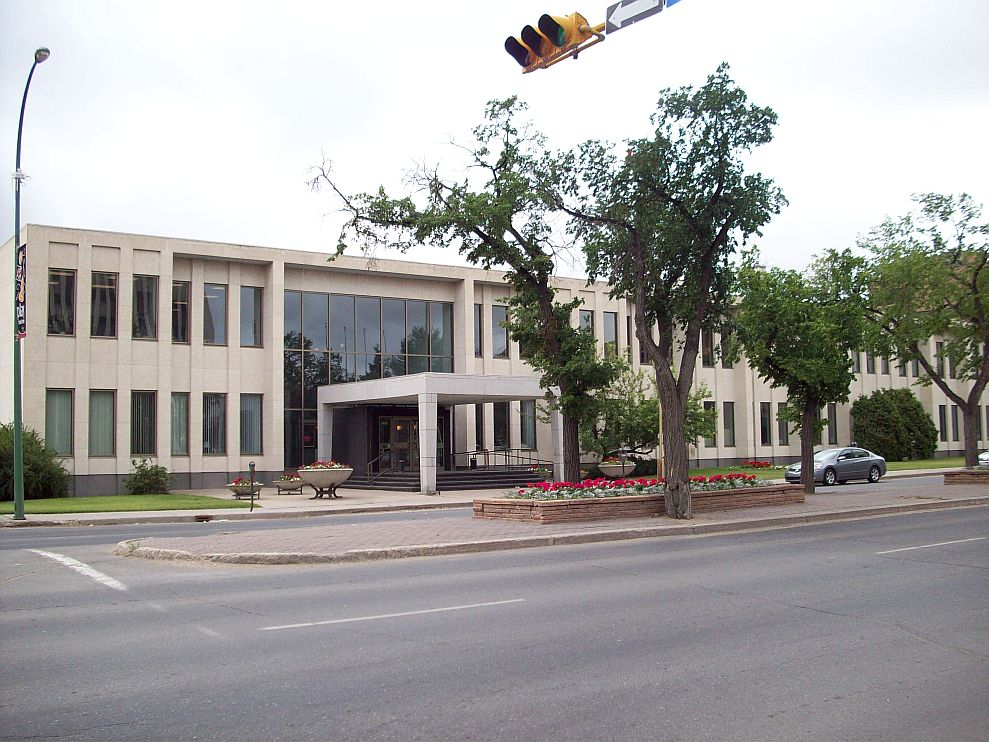
Regina Court House

The court consists of 29 full-time judges and 10 supernumerary judges, all appointed and paid by the federal government. The court's Chief Justice, currently Martel D. Popescul, is styled the Chief Justice of the King's Bench. Both the Chief Justice and puisne justices are addressed as "My Lord" or "My Lady" and referred to as "His Lordship" or "Her Ladyship". This differs from the terminology used in the Provincial Court of Saskatchewan, whose judges are "Your Honour", "His Honour" or "Her Honour".

The court sits in nine judicial centres and actions are generally brought in the judicial centre closest to where the action arose, or the residence or place of business of the defendant.

== Jurisdiction ==
The court hears civil and criminal law cases. It is a court of inherent jurisdiction and there is no monetary limit on the claims which it may hear. It also has original jurisdiction over matters assigned to it by statute, such as adjudicating human rights complaints.

The court has a Family Law Division, which has exclusive jurisdiction over family law matters in the judicial centres of Saskatoon, Regina, and Prince Albert, and concurrent jurisdiction (with the Provincial Court) over family law matters in all other areas of the province.

As a superior court of original jurisdiction, it has supervisory jurisdiction over administrative tribunals, exercised by the prerogative writs. It also has some appellate jurisdiction, hearing appeals from the Provincial Court of Saskatchewan and some administrative bodies. Appeals may be taken from the King's Bench to the Court of Appeal for Saskatchewan. A further appeal lies to the Supreme Court of Canada.

== History ==
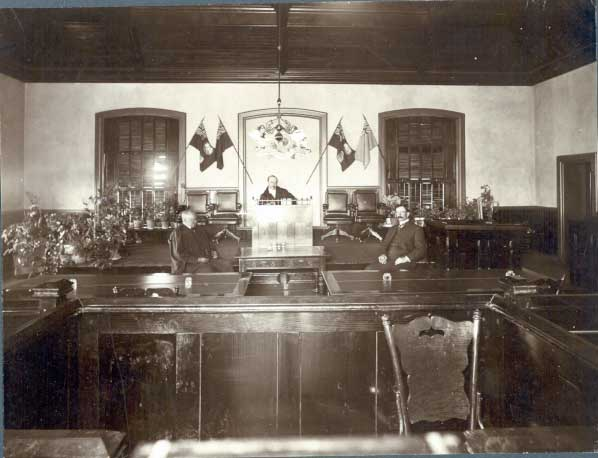
Regina Court House 1900, Victoria Avenue and Hamilton Street. Pictured are Dixie Watson (seated right), Court Clerk; J. M. Duncan; Justice Newlands.

Until it became a province in 1905, Saskatchewan was part of the North-West Territories as it existed at that time and its judicial system was that of the territory. In fact, it was not until 1907 – two years after Saskatchewan became a province – that the new province's judicial system was established. The initial court structure of 1907 consisted of three courts: the Supreme Court of Saskatchewan, the District Court (similar to the County Courts of other provinces) and the Surrogate Court. There was no appeal court; rather, appeals were conducted by the full court of the Supreme Court of Saskatchewan, consisting of all the judges of the Supreme Court, other than the judge who made the decision under appeal.

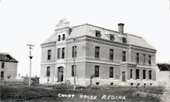
Regina Court House of the King's Bench of Saskatchewan, 2002 Victoria Avenue, c. 1919

During the First World War, the province reorganized its courts. In 1915, the province passed legislation, The King's Bench Act and The Court of Appeal Act, for the purpose of creating a new court structure. Those acts came into effect on March 1, 1918, resulting in the abolition of the Supreme Court of Saskatchewan and the creation of the trial-level Court of King's Bench and the Court of Appeal.

In 1981, Saskatchewan merged its District Court into the Court of Queen's Bench. As part of that process, the judicial centres of the District Court became the judicial centres of the Court of King's Bench.

== Styling ==
The Court of King's Bench Act foresaw the need to rename the court in the event of a female monarch. The act provides that, during the reign of a king, the court is known as the Court of King's Bench for Saskatchewan. During the reign of a queen, it is known as the Court of Queen's Bench for Saskatchewan.

== Courts of Saskatchewan ==
There are three main courts in Saskatchewan:

- Court of Appeal for Saskatchewan – appellate court; highest court of Saskatchewan.
- Court of King's Bench for Saskatchewan – superior trial court of Saskatchewan with inherent and unlimited jurisdiction
- Provincial Court of Saskatchewan – court of first instance; trial court with jurisdiction defined by statute

== Notable cases ==
=== Attorney General of Canada v Merchant Law Group, 2015 ===
In January 2015, the Attorney General of Canada, on behalf of the federal government launched a lawsuit against Tony Merchant's Regina, Saskatchewan-based law firm—Merchant Law Group (MLG).

=== July 16, 2015 IRSSA ruling by Justice Neil Gabrielson ===
Under then Prime Minister Stephen Harper, the Conservative government gave a mandate to officials from the Department of Aboriginal Affairs and Northern Development—now known as the Crown-Indigenous Relations and Northern Development Canada—to "negotiate a settlement with the Catholic entities" who had committed in the Indian Residential Schools Settlement Agreement (IRSSA) to raise $25 million to pay for healing programs for survivors. As a result, in August 2015, "negotiations began, resulting in a signed agreement on October 30, 2015, and a withdrawal of the Protective Notice of Appeal. Justice Neil Gabrielson had ruled on July 16, 2015 that the federal Conservative government under then Prime Minister Stephen Harper had "inadvertently released 50 Catholic entities from their contractual responsibility to try to raise up to $25-million for aboriginal healing programs". He said that lawyers on both sides—Alexander Gay representing the federal government and Gordon Kuski, representing the "Catholic entities" had a "meeting of the minds" on a "re-lease" of the Catholic entities from "all obligations". Gabrielson ruled that Gay "should be presumed in this dispute to have had the authority to negotiate on behalf of the Canadian government".

A federal government official had confirmed there was "miscommunication with government lawyers that allowed the Catholic Church to escape paying close to $25-million", according to a May 19, 2016 Aboriginal Peoples Television Network (APTN) article "Residential schools settlement agreement under fire".

Under the Indian Residential Schools Settlement Agreement (IRSSA) fifty Catholic entities were under three obligations which included $29 million to the Aboriginal Healing Foundation, $25 million through "services to aboriginal communities" and finally to use their "best efforts" to "raise $25-million for additional healing programs". By 2015, only $3.7 of the $25 million had been raised. In his July ruling, Gabrielson said that "for a payment of $1.2-million, the Catholic entities were to be released from their responsibilities to raise the remainder of the $25-million, and be seen to have completed the other two categories of contributions." The Catholic entitles had also claimed $29 million for administrative costs.

At the request of The Globe and Mail a University of Alberta law professor, Eric Adams, and Ken Young, a residential school survivor and a Winnipeg lawyer, who read Gabrielson's ruling said that the government under Prime Minister Justin Trudeau should have appealed Gabrielson's ruling, as the stakes were so high. Young said that it did not appear that Gay had agreed on behalf of the federal government to "allow the Catholic entities to walk away from their fundraising obligations." The decision served the federal government's interests which explains why an appeal of the ruling was never sought. The Catholic entities under the IRSSA were allowed create a corporation that was to be used to make payment. The fifty Catholic entities were allowed to hide behind a secret agreement where the identity of the Catholic entities that made or failed to make a contribution to the corporation was to remain undisclosed. The victims received payment from the corporation without ever knowing the providence of the monies. The in-kind contributions as well as the monetary contributions were never fully paid. The federal government was content to allow Gabrielson's ruling to stand and bring an end to what was a bad deal for the victims.

In April 2016, then Indigenous Affairs Minister Carolyn Bennett said that while the Liberal government under Prime Minister Trudeau would put pressure on the Catholic church to resume fundraising efforts towards to remainder of the $25 million, the federal government would not "make up the shortfall."

=== R v Stanley (2018) ===
In R v Stanley, presided by Saskatchewan Chief Justice Popescul, a jury which was alleged by some, but not confirmed to be, all-White, acquitted local Battleford, Saskatchewan farmer Gerald Stanley on February 9, 2018. The jury found that the death of Colten Boushie, from the Cree Red Pheasant First Nation occurred because of "hang fire". Clint Wuttunee, Chief of the Red Pheasant First Nation, called the verdict "absolutely perverse". Following the announcement of the acquittal, rallies and vigils took place across Canada. The rally at the Saskatoon court attracted 1,000 people who supported Boushie's family and were frustrated by the jury's decision. At a press conference on February 11, hosted by Saskatoon Tribal Council, Mayor Clark described the event as a "defining moment for this community and this country".
