= List of people from Regina, Saskatchewan =

This is a list of notable persons who were born, grew up in or spent a portion of their life and/or career in Regina, Saskatchewan.

== A ==
- Velma Abbott (1929–1987), All-American Girls Professional Baseball League player
- Dan Achen, guitarist, producer, co-founder of alternative rock band Junkhouse
- Josh Archibald, professional ice hockey player for the Tampa Bay Lightning

== B ==
- Joseph Baggaley (c. 1884–1918), trade unionist
- Bonnie Baker (1918–2003), All-American Girls Professional Baseball League player
- Henry Baker, former Regina mayor, former member of Saskatchewan Legislative Assembly
- Staff Barootes (1918–2000), senator
- Doris Barr (1921–2009), All-American Girls Professional Baseball League player
- Ethan Bear, hockey player in the NHL
- Carla Beck, member of Saskatchewan Legislative Assembly, current leader of the Official Opposition
- Drew Beckie, soccer player
- Catherine Bennett (born 1920), All-American Girls Professional Baseball League player
- Red Berenson, Team Canada 1972, former NHL player and coach, head coach of the University of Michigan ice hockey team
- Jan Betker, former Olympic women's curling gold medalist
- Mike Blaisdell, former NHL player
- Allan Blakeney, former premier of Saskatchewan
- Ronald Bloore, Regina Five artist
- Bob Boyer, visual artist, elder, university professor
- Tyler Bozak, NHL player
- Beverley Breuer, actor whose credits include Scary Movie 4
- Ivan Brown, CFL player
- Jake Burt, Regina-born CFL player
- Garth Butcher, NHL player

== C ==
- Jock Callander, IHL all-time scoring leader
- Ruth Chambers, sculptor
- Kale Clague, NHL player
- Dan Clark, CFL player
- Jason Clermont, CFL player
- Terry Cochrane, Canadian football player
- Martha Cole, fabric artist
- Grant Connell, professional tennis player
- Meara Conway, member of Saskatchewan Legislative Assembly

== D ==
- Charlie David, actor
- Stu Davis (1921–2007), aka "Canada's Cowboy Troubadour"); singer/guitarist, known internationally for songwriting, recordings, radio and television
- Robert Dirk, former NHLer
- Mark Docherty, politician
- Shirley Douglas, actor, daughter of Tommy Douglas; mother of Kiefer Sutherland
- Tommy Douglas, CCF premier 1944–1961; later leader of the federal New Democratic Party
- Dave Dryburgh (1908–1948), Scotland-born sports journalist for The Leader-Post and Canadian Football Hall of Fame inductee
- Duke Dukowski, former NHLer
- Matt Dumba, NHL player for the Dallas Stars
- Darren Dutchyshen (1966–2024), sports broadcaster and SportsCentre anchor for TSN

== E ==
- Jordan Eberle, NHL player and alternate captain for the Seattle Kraken
- Murray Edwards, one of the richest Canadians
- Jack Engle, hot rodder and custom camshaft grinder, founder of Engle Cams (to American parents)
- Zack Evans, CFL player

== F ==
- Joe Fafard, sculptor and artist
- Holly Fay, painter
- Scott Flory, current University of Saskatchewan football head coach, former CFL player
- Stu Foord, CFL player
- Jaxon Ford, Canadian football player
- Leanne Franson, cartoonist and illustrator
- Jackie Friesen, assistant coach with the Wisconsin Badgers women's ice hockey team

== G ==
- Genevieve George (1927–2002), All-American Girls Professional Baseball League player
- Tamon George, Canadian football player
- Chris Getzlaf, CFL player
- Ryan Getzlaf, NHL player
- Ted Godwin, Regina Five artist
- Ralph Goodale, politician
- Dirk Graham, NHL player
- Gordon Grant, politician
- Roland Groome, first licensed commercial pilot in Canada

== H ==
- Josh Hagerty, CFL player
- Jack Hamilton (1886–1976), Canadian ice hockey and multi-sport executive
- Kevin Hanson, basketball player and coach
- Cory Harrower, Paralympic wheelchair basketball player
- Scott Hartnell, NHL player
- Mike Hasenfratz, ice hockey referee
- Ben Hebert, curler
- Ben Heenan, CFL player
- Kyle Herranen, interdisciplinary artist
- Trevor Herriot, naturalist and writer
- Jamie Heward, NHL player
- Bill Hicke, NHL player with the Montreal Canadiens, New York Rangers, Oakland Seals, and the Pittsburgh Penguins
- Jim Hopson, CFL player and executive
- Risa Horowitz, visual and media artist
- Neal Hughes, CFL player
- Nick Hutchins, Canadian football player
- Bill Hutchinson, politician

== I ==
- Roger Ing, painter
- Into Eternity, progressive metal band
- Dick Irvin, Jr., hockey broadcaster

== J ==
- Colin James (born 1964), singer; has won seven Juno Awards
- Christine Jewitt (1926–2018), All-American Girls Professional Baseball League player
- Arleene Johnson (1924–2017), All-American Girls Professional Baseball League player
- Evan Johnson, CFL player
- Marguerite Jones (1917–1995), All-American Girls Professional Baseball League player
- Daisy Junor (1919–2012), All-American Girls Professional Baseball League player

== K ==
- Connie Kaldor, singer-songwriter
- Matt Kellett, CFL player
- Augustus Kenderdine, painter
- Donald M. Kendrick, Calgary native, choral conductor and teacher at the University of Saskatchewan, Regina Campus, in the 1970s
- Roy Kiyooka, painter
- Morgan Klimchuk, AHL player for the Belleville Senators
- Marty Klyne, Canadian senator
- Rory Kohlert, CFL player
- Chris Kramer, actor
- Serge Kujawa, politician
- Chris Kunitz, NHL player

== L ==
- Michelle LaVallee, curator, artist, and educator
- Brayden Lenius, CFL player
- Elyse Levesque, actress, born and raised in Regina
- Sarah Lind, actor
- Dwain Lingenfelter, politician
- Kenneth Lochhead, Regina Five artist
- Andrea Ludwig, soprano
- Lyldoll, singer

== M ==
- Jeannie Mah, ceramic artist
- Gene Makowsky, former member of Saskatchewan Legislative Assembly, former CFL player
- John Joseph "Jack" Malone, ace fighter pilot in WWI, lived in Regina before enlisting
- Ted Malone, former member of Saskatchewan Legislative Assembly, former Leader of the Opposition
- Russ Marchuk, politician
- Dianne Martin, lawyer
- Daniel Maslany, actor
- Tatiana Maslany, actress
- Mike Maurer, CFL player
- Warren McCall, former member of Saskatchewan Legislative Assembly
- Ethel McCreary, All-American Girls Professional Baseball League player
- Mick McGeough, NHL referee
- Frances Gertrude McGill, pioneering forensic pathologist and criminologist
- Arthur McKay, Regina Five artist
- Jackie McLeod, ice hockey and baseball player, inductee into the IIHF Hall of Fame
- Craig McMorris, snowboarder
- Don McMorris, politician
- Mark McMorris, snowboarding, bronze medalist winter Olympic winner at 2018 Winter Olympics Pyeongchang and 18-time Xgames medalist
- Gerry Minor, former NHL player
- Douglas Morton, Regina Five artist
- Marc Mueller, CFL coach
- Garth Murray, NHL player
- Ryan Murray, NHL player
- Maye Musk, model and mother of entrepreneur Elon Musk

== N ==
- Steve Nash, former basketball player and head basketball coach
- Zarqa Nawaz, creator of the CBC sitcom Little Mosque on the Prairie
- Patrick Neufeld, CFL player
- Erik Nielsen, federal politician, former deputy prime minister
- Leslie Nielsen, actor whose credits include Airplane!, three Naked Gun movies and Scary Movie 3
- John Nilson, politician

== O ==
- Jeremy O'Day, current CFL executive, former CFL player
- Paul Owen, cricketer

== P ==
- Yens Pedersen, politician
- Michael Peers, archbishop of Qu'Appelle; primate of the Anglican Church of Canada 1986–2004
- Janet Perkin (1921–2012), professional baseball and curling player
- Al Pickard (1895–1975), Canadian Amateur Hockey Association president and Hockey Hall of Fame inductee
- Jason Plumb, popular musician formerly with the Waltons
- David Plummer, software engineer for Microsoft MS-DOS and Microsoft Windows
- Edward Poitras, multimedia artist
- Logan Pyett, AHL player and member of gold medal-winning Team Canada in 2005–2006 (U18 Junior World Cup) and 2007–08 (World Junior Championship)
- Wayne Pyne (1917–2004), football player

== R ==
- Chuck Radley (1925–1977), CFL player
- Roger Reinson, CFL player
- Addison Richards, CFL player
- Erika Ritter, playwright and broadcaster
- Martha Rommelaere (1922–2011), All-American Girls Professional Baseball League player
- Jon Ryan (1982), NFL and CFL player
- Metro Rybchuk, politician

== S ==
- Johnny Sandison, radio personality, weather presenter
- Nicole Sarauer, Saskatchewan MLA and former leader of the Official Opposition
- Andrew Scheer, Conservative politician for Regina-Qu'Appelle
- Stu Scheurwater, Major League Baseball umpire
- Karl Schubach, vocalist of metalcore band Misery Signals
- Jack Semple, blues guitarist
- Andy Shauf, musician
- Mike Sillinger, NHL player
- Louise Simard, politician
- Kolten Solomon, former professional Canadian football player
- Randy Srochenski, CFL player
- Charley Stis (1884–1979), professional baseball player, manager and umpire
- Leesa Streifler, multimedia artist
- Stephen Surjik, television and motion picture director whose credits include The Kids in the Hall and Wayne's World 2

== T ==
- Dione Taylor, jazz singer
- Ed Tchorzewski, politician
- Tesher, singer
- Andrew Thomson, politician
- Kim Trew, politician

== V ==
- Harry Van Mulligen, politician
- Darren Veitch, former NHL player

== W ==
- Mildred Warwick (1922–2006), All-American Girls Professional Baseball League player
- Christine Welsh, Métis filmmaker
- Elizabeth Wicken (1927–2011), All-American Girls Professional Baseball League player
- Doug Wickenheiser (1961–99), NHL player
- Paul Woldu, CFL player
- Trent Wotherspoon, politician

== Y ==
- Kevin Yates, politician

== See also ==
- List of people from Prince Albert, Saskatchewan
- List of people from Saskatoon
