= List of people from Saskatchewan =

Provincial flag of Saskatchewan

This is a list of notable people who are from Saskatchewan, Canada, or have spent a large part or formative part of their career in that province.

== A ==
- Velma Abbott (1929–1987) – All-American Girls Professional Baseball League player
- Mark Abley – writer
- Dan Achen – guitarist, producer, co-founder of alternative rock band Junkhouse
- Mel Angelstad – professional ice hockey player
- Hazen Argue – politician, Senator, MP, Cabinet Minister
- Colby Armstrong – NHL hockey player with Toronto Maple Leafs
- Riley Armstrong – NHL hockey player with Detroit Red Wings
- Brent Ashton – former NHL hockey player
- Dick Assman – gas station attendant facetiously given fame on the David Letterman television show
- Calvin Ayre – founder of Bodog

== B ==
- Mike Babcock – head coach of the NHL's Toronto Maple Leafs; head coach of Canadian Ice Hockey Olympic team, 2012; head coach of Canadian Ice Hockey World Cup team, 2016
- Lorne Babiuk – director, VIDO
- Garnet Bailey – NHL forward, died on United Airlines Flight 175
- Mike Bales – hockey player
- J. G. Ballard – English novelist and short story writer
- Molly Lyons Bar-David - journalist, cookbook author
- Burke Barlow – musician
- Doris Barr (1921–2009) – All-American Girls Professional Baseball League player
- Wade Belak (1976–2011) – former NHL player with Nashville Predators
- Catherine Bennett (born 1920) – All-American Girls Professional Baseball League player
- Red Berenson – Team Canada 1972, former NHL player and coach; head coach of the University of Michigan's ice hockey team
- Todd Bergen – hockey player
- Sarah Binks – fictional character created by Paul Hiebert, in whose gently satirical biography Regina figures as the rustic's metropolis
- Byron Bitz – former professional hockey player
- Randy Black – drummer for Primal Fear
- Trevor Blackwell – entrepreneur
- Mike Blaisdell – former NHL player
- Allan Blakeney – former Premier of Saskatchewan
- Derek Boogaard (1982–2011) – former NHL hockey player with New York Rangers
- Mike Botha – master diamond cutter
- Ray Boughen – former mayor, current Member of Parliament for the riding of Palliser
- Johnny Bower – hockey goaltender
- Bob Boyer – visual artist, elder, university professor
- Tyler Bozak – NHL player
- Beverley Breuer – actor whose credits include Scary Movie 4
- Dave Brown – former NHL player
- Sidney Buckwold – former mayor of Saskatoon
- David Luther Burgess – World War I pilot and politician
- Garth Butcher – NHL player
- Brent Butt – actor

== C ==
- Hugh Cairns – World War I soldier awarded the Victoria Cross
- Jock Callander – IHL all-time scoring leader
- Lorne Calvert – Premier of Saskatchewan (2001–2007)
- Earl Cameron – broadcaster
- Scotty Cameron – hockey player
- Ethel Catherwood – Olympic medallist
- Emily Clark – Olympic hockey player
- Wendel Clark – former professional hockey player
- Lawrence Clarke – HBC official
- Reggie Cleveland – World Series-starting baseball pitcher
- Kim Coates (born 1958) – Canadian/American actor, Sons of Anarchy; born in Saskatoon
- Terry Cochrane – Canadian football player
- John Comiskey – football player
- Neil Stanley Crawford – politician and jazz musician

== D ==
- Mark Dacey – 2004 Brier Champion
- Rod Dallman – hockey player
- Charlie David – actor
- Spencer Davis – general foreman
- Stu Davis – country & western singer/songwriter, recording artist, television and radio host
- Thomas Osborne Davis – politician
- Scott Deibert – former Canadian football player
- Graham DeLaet – professional golfer
- Ivor Dent – politician
- Phyllis Dewar – Olympic swimmer
- John Diefenbaker – former Prime Minister of Canada
- Robert Dirk – former NHLer
- Ken Doraty – former National Hockey League player
- Shirley Douglas – actor, daughter of T.C. Douglas; mother of Kiefer Sutherland
- T.C. Douglas – CCF premier 1944–1961; later leader of the federal New Democratic Party
- Rick Ducommun – actor
- Duke Dukowski – former NHLer
- Mathew Dumba – ice hockey player

== E ==
- Jordan Eberle – NHL player for the New York Islanders
- Murray Edwards – one of the richest Canadians
- Michael Eklund – actor
- Dan Ellis – NHL goaltender with Florida Panthers
- Shane Endicott – former NHL hockey player

== F ==
- Joe Fafard – sculptor and artist
- Sylvia Fedoruk – scientist, former Lieutenant Governor of Saskatchewan
- Feist (full name Leslie Feist) – singer-songwriter best known for her 2007 hit single "1234"
- Larry Fisher – murderer of Gail Miller
- Robert Fleming – composer, pianist, organist, choirmaster, and teacher
- Emile Francis – former National Hockey League player and coach
- Lisa Franks – Paralympic athlete
- Don Freed – singer/songwriter
- Dawna Friesen – newscaster
- Jackie Friesen – assistant coach with the Wisconsin Badgers women's ice hockey team
- Pete Friesen – guitar player for Alice Cooper, Bruce Dickinson of Iron Maiden and The Almighty
- Gayleen Froese – author
- Wes Funk – writer

== G ==
- Michael Garnett – former NHL goaltender with the Atlanta Thrashers
- Chris Getzlaf – CFL player
- Ryan Getzlaf – NHL player
- Clark Gillies – former National Hockey League player
- Joanna Glass – playwright
- Glenda Goertzen – author
- Bruce Gordon – athlete and detective sergeant
- Dirk Graham – NHL player
- Thelma Grambo – All-American Girls Professional Baseball League player
- Mary Greyeyes (1920–2011) – first First Nations woman to join the Canadian Armed Forces
- Michael Greyeyes – actor, born in Saskatchewan
- Roland Groome – first licensed commercial pilot in Canada
- Tom Grummett – comic book artist
- Eric Gryba – NHL player with the Edmonton Oilers
- Peter Gzowski – resided in Moose Jaw in 1957

== H ==
- Chris Hajt – professional ice hockey player, Lukko
- Emmett Hall – former Supreme Court Justice
- Stu Hart – professional wrestling patriarch
- Scott Hartnell – NHL player
- Ellie Harvie – actress; portrayed Morticia on The New Addams Family; was raised in Prince Albert
- Dale Henry – hockey player
- Jamie Heward – NHL player
- Bill Hicke – NHL player with the Montreal Canadiens, New York Rangers, Oakland Seals, and the Pittsburgh Penguins
- Douglas Hill – author
- Ray Hnatyshyn – former Governor General of Canada
- Randy Hoback – politician
- Braden Holtby – NHL goaltender
- Gustin House – Lyell Gustin, decades-long teacher of many eminent pianists province-wide
- Stan Hovdebo – politician and educator
- Gordie Howe – former NHL and WHA hockey player
- Bill Hunter (died 2002) – ice hockey entrepreneur

== I ==
- Roger Ing – artist
- Into Eternity – progressive metal band
- Dick Irvin Jr. – Hockey Night in Canada broadcaster
- James Isbister – Métis leader

== J ==
- Honoré Jackson – Métis leader
- Tom Jackson – actor and folk singer
- Colin James – six-time Juno Award-winning blues-rock musician
- Harry Jerome – sprinter
- Christine Jewitt (born 1926) – All-American Girls Professional Baseball League player
- Arleene Johnson (born 1924) – All-American Girls Professional Baseball League player
- Marguerite Jones (1917–1995) – All-American Girls Professional Baseball League player
- Daisy Junor (1919–2012) – All-American Girls Professional Baseball League player

== K ==
- Connie Kaldor – singer
- Miklos Kanitz – Holocaust survivor
- Ryan Keller – NHL hockey player, Ottawa Senators
- Donald M. Kendrick – Calgary native, choral conductor and teacher at the University of Saskatchewan, Regina Campus, in the 1970s
- Dave King – university and NHL hockey coach
- Chester Knight – Canadian folk singer-songwriter
- Joy Kogawa – author and poet
- Kirk Krack – freediver
- Darcy Kuemper – goalie for the NHL franchise Minnesota Wild
- Chris Kunitz – NHL player
- Kaylyn Kyle – member of the Canada women's national soccer team

== L ==
- John Henderson Lamont – Supreme Court Justice
- Annette Lapointe – writer
- Regan Lauscher – luge champion
- James Le Jeune (born 1910) – painter, born in Saskatoon
- Catriona Le May Doan – speed skater, Olympic medallist
- Curtis Leschyshyn – former NHL hockey player
- Brock Lesnar – professional wrestler currently signed with WWE; residence in Regina
- Sarah Lind – actor
- Art Linkletter – radio and television host of Art Linkletter's House Party
- Reed Low – former NHL player
- Trey Lyles – professional basketball player

== M ==
- Keith Magnuson (died 2003) – former NHL hockey player, Chicago Blackhawks
- Charles Mair – poet
- Kevin Mambo – actor and musician
- Tyler Mane – former pro wrestler and actor
- Yann Martel – Booker Prize-winning author
- Tatiana Maslany – actress
- Mike Maurer – CFL fullback
- Chris McAllister – former NHL hockey player
- Bud McCaig – co-owner of the Calgary Flames
- Ethel McCreary – All-American Girls Professional Baseball League player
- Brad McCrimmon – former NHL player and coach
- Mick McGeough – NHL referee
- Frances Gertrude McGill – pioneering forensic pathologist and criminologist
- Thomas McKay – politician and farmer
- Mark McMorris – professional snowboarder
- Gail Miller – victim murder by Larry Fisher, for which David Milgaard was falsely convicted
- Gerry Minor – former NHLer
- Mike Mintenko – Commonwealth Games swimmer
- David Mitchell – National Lacrosse League player
- Joni Mitchell – musician, artist
- Ken Mitchell – author, member of the Order of Canada
- Allan Moffat – racing car driver and four-time winner of the Bathurst 1000
- Blair Morgan – motocross/snowcross athlete
- Keith Morrison – former NBC television news anchor
- Brenden Morrow – retired NHL hockey player
- Farley Mowat – novelist
- Jerome Mrazek – hockey player
- Scott Munroe – American Hockey League player
- Garth Murray – NHL player

== N ==
- Steve Nash – former professional basketball player and head coach of the NBA's Brooklyn Nets
- Zarqa Nawaz – creator of the CBC sitcom Little Mosque on the Prairie
- Carey Nelson – long-distance runner
- Jeff Nelson – hockey player
- Darin Nesbitt – professor at Douglas College
- Ted Newall – entrepreneur
- Erik Nielsen – federal politician, former deputy prime minister
- Leslie Nielsen – actor whose credits include Airplane!, Naked Gun and Scary Movie 4
- Tanner Novlan – actor whose credits include The Bold and the Beautiful

== O ==
- Fergie Olver – Toronto Blue Jays broadcaster
- Paul Owen – cricketer

== P ==
- Ryan Parent – hockey player
- Donny Parenteau – country music singer, songwriter, and musician
- Denis Pederson – hockey player
- Michael Peers – Archbishop of Qu'Appelle; Primate of the Anglican Church of Canada 1986–2004
- Michaela Pereira – former CNN anchor, HLN anchor
- Janet Perkin (1921–2012) – professional baseball and curling player
- Krista Phillips – professional basketball player (former University of Michigan Women's Basketball player)
- Rich Pilon – former NHL hockey player
- "Rowdy" Roddy Piper (Roderick Toombs) (died 2015) – professional wrestler and film actor
- Jason Plumb – popular musician formerly with the Waltons
- Logan Pyett – AHL player (Detroit Red Wings organization) and member of gold medal-winning Team Canada in 2005–2006 (U18 Junior World Cup) and 2007–2008 (World Junior Championship)

== R ==
- Wade Redden – NHL defenceman
- Doug Redl – Canadian football player
- Scott Redl – Canadian football player
- Drew Remenda – TV colour analyst for the San Jose Sharks and radio show host
- Chico Resch – former National Hockey League goalie
- Kyle Riabko – actor and musician
- Erika Ritter – playwright and broadcaster
- Jessica Robinson – country music singer
- Jim Robson – broadcaster
- Roy Romanow – former Premier of Saskatchewan
- Martha Rommelaere (1922–2011) – All-American Girls Professional Baseball League player
- Terry Ruskowski – hockey player

== S ==
- William Sarjeant – geology professor and author
- Fred Sasakamoose – first Canadian Aboriginal National Hockey League player
- Brayden Schenn – NHL hockey player with Philadelphia Flyers
- Luke Schenn – NHL hockey player with Arizona Coyotes
- Sandra Schmirler (1963–2000) – former curler, 3 time Canadian champion, 3 time World Champion, 1998 Olympic Games gold medallist
- Karl Schubach – vocalist of metalcore band Misery Signals
- Thomas Walter Scott – first Premier of Saskatchewan
- Jack Semple – blues guitarist
- Shiloh – singer
- Mike Sillinger – NHL player
- Brian Skrudland – former NHL hockey forward, two-time Stanley Cup Champion
- Arthur Slade – Governor General's Award-winning author
- Doug Smail – former National Hockey League player
- Theresa Sokyrka – musician, artist
- Brent Sopel – NHL hockey player with Atlanta Thrashers
- Levi Steinhauer – CFL player
- John Stevenson – politician
- Charley Stis (1884–1979) – professional baseball player, manager and umpire
- Jarret Stoll – NHL hockey player with Los Angeles Kings
- Neil Stonechild – high-profile victim of a starlight tour
- Joey Stylez (Joseph Laplante) – hip hop artist
- Stephen Surjik – television and motion picture director whose credits include The Kids in the Hall and Wayne's World 2
- David Sutcliffe – actor
- Anne Szumigalski – poet

== T ==
- Dione Taylor – jazz singer
- Tesher (real name Hitesh Sharma) – singer, rapper, songwriter, and producer best known for his 2021 single "Jalebi Baby" featuring Jason Derulo
- Ross Thatcher – former Premier Province of Saskatchewan (1964–1971)
- Max Thompson – Nordic combined skier
- Dave Tippett – former NHL player, NHL coach
- Gordon Tootoosis – First Nations actor
- Shannon Tweed – actor, wife of Gene Simmons of Kiss

== U ==
- Geoffrey Ursell – writer

== V ==
- Guy Vanderhaeghe – author
- Sugith Varughese – writer, director and actor
- Darren Veitch – former NHL player
- Jon Vickers – opera singer
- Suzie Vinnick – folk/blues singer-songwriter and guitarist

== W ==
- Brad Wall – former Premier
- Colter Wall – country and folk musician
- Owen Walter – hockey player
- Cam Ward – NHL hockey goaltender, Carolina Hurricanes
- Mildred Warwick (1922–2006) – All-American Girls Professional Baseball League player
- George Weaver – politician and metallurgical engineer
- Ed Whalen – host and commentator, Stampede Wrestling
- Elizabeth Wicken (1927–2011) – All-American Girls Professional Baseball League player
- Doug Wickenheiser (1961–1999) – NHL player
- Hayley Wickenheiser – hockey player and multiple Olympic medallist
- Rick Wilson – hockey player
- W. Brett Wilson – businessman and former star on Dragon's Den
- Steven Woods – Quack.com co-founder, current Google Waterloo site director
- Henry Woolf – actor
- Janet Wright – actress and cast member of Corner Gas

== Y ==
- Dylan Yeo – hockey player
- Steven Yeun – actor

== See also ==
- List of people from Prince Albert, Saskatchewan
- List of people from Regina, Saskatchewan
- List of people from Saskatoon
