= Agnes Gallus =

Hungarian-Canadian artist (1930–2010)

- Born: May 15, 1930; Ópályi, Kingdom of Hungary
- Died: August 8, 2010 (aged 80); Toronto, Ontario, Canada
- Occupation: Painter
- Spouse: Laszlo Aladar Gallus (m. 1954–1968)
- Children: 3, including Maya Gallus

Agnes Szentgyörgyi Gallus (May 15, 1930 – August 8, 2010) was a Hungarian-Canadian painter who immigrated to Regina, Saskatchewan, in 1957.

== Early life ==
Agnes Szentgyorgyi was born in Ópályi, Hungary on May 15, 1930. She was the fifth of six children born to George Victor Szentgyorgyi and Maria (née Fedora). She attended a convent school as a child before studying art in Győr. In 1954, she married Laszlo Aladar Gallus. They fled the country with their infant son during the Hungarian Revolution of 1956. At the time, Agnes was pregnant with their first daughter, who was born in Vienna. They immigrated to Regina, Saskatchewan in 1957. They had a second daughter, Maya, before separating in 1968.

== Career ==
In Canada, Gallus studied art at the University of Saskatchewan with artists Kenneth Lochhead and Ted Godwin, and taught art classes there between 1970 and 1977. She was a contemporary of The Regina Five, and participated in Emma Lake Artists' Workshops. During that period she studied under Harold Cohen, Frank Stella, and Roy Kiyooka.

In 2003, she moved to Toronto where she continued working as an artist until her death on August 8, 2010. Her work was exhibited at the SK Arts "Until Spring" exhibition in 2021, and "There's an Artist" in the Garden in Regina in 2016, with fellow Saskatchewan artists Wynona Mulcaster, Mina Forsyth, Donna Kriekle, and Russell Yuristy.

Her art is held in public and private collections, including the Dunlop Art Gallery, SK Arts, the MacKenzie Art Gallery, and the University of Regina President's Art Collection.
