= Ann James (artist) =

Canadian artist and educator (1925–2011)

- Born: 1925; Hove, East Sussex
- Died: 2011
- Known for: artist, educator

Ann James (1925–2011) was an English-born Canadian artist and educator.

== Career ==
Harris was born in Hove, East Sussex and studied at the Brighton School of Art. She came to Regina, Saskatchewan in 1946 and pursued further studies in art at the University of Saskatchewan, studying there with Arthur McKay, Kenneth Lochhead and Jack Sures. James also attended the Emma Lake Artists' Workshops. She moved back to England to London in 1976.

She led workshops and gave lectures and demonstrations in both Canada and the United Kingdom, including sculpture and ceramics courses at the Chelsea College of Arts. James died in London in 2011.

James' work was exhibited at Expo '70 in Osaka. at the Musée d'Art Moderne de la Ville de Paris, the Burlington Art Centre and the Art Gallery of Nova Scotia. Her art is included in the collections of the Victoria and Albert Museum, the Canada Council Art Bank, the Art Gallery of Greater Victoria, the Tokyo Imperial Palace, the MacKenzie Art Gallery in Regina and the University of Regina.
