= Donna Kriekle =

Canadian artist (born 1945)

- Born: 1945 (age 80–81); Southey, Saskatchewan
- Known for: painter, graphic artist, installation artist, printmaker

Donna Kriekle (born 1945) is a Canadian artist who lives in Regina, Saskatchewan.

Kriekle was born in Southey, Saskatchewan. She received a Bachelor of Arts degree from the University of Regina in 1969, where she studied with Arthur McKay, Ted Godwin, and Doug Morton. She also took art classes at Concordia University in 1970.

== Career ==
Kriekle taught painting at the University of Regina's Extension Division from 1980 to 1989 and through the MacKenzie Art Gallery's Outreach Program from 1984 to 1985. Her artwork was featured on the fine silver maple leaf fractional set of collector coins released in 2015 from the Royal Canadian Mint commemorating the historic reign of Her Majesty Queen Elizabeth II.

== Sources ==
- "Artist/Maker Name 'Kriekle, Donna'" Artists in Canada. Retrieved 27 February 2016.
- "Donna Kriekle" ArtSask. Retrieved 27 February 2016.
- Kriekle, Donna and Zepp, Norman. Donna Kriekle : Artists with Their Work. Regina, Sask.: Norman Mackenzie Art Gallery, 1984.
- Kriekle, Donna. Life lines. Regina : Dunlop Art Gallery, 1993.
