= Holly Fay =

Canadian artist and painter

- Education: University of Regina, University of Ulster
- Known for: drawer, painter, installation work
- Awards: National Visual Arts Advocacy Award
- Website: www.hollyfay.com

Holly Fay is a Canadian contemporary artist in Regina, Saskatchewan. She is known for her drawings, paintings and installation work, which explore themes of interconnectedness of natural phenomena, ecological systems, phenomenology and the lived environment, and the more-than-human world. Her works have been exhibited across Canada and internationally. She is currently an Associate Professor in the Visual Arts Department at the University of Regina

== Education ==
Fay studied at the University of Regina, receiving her Bachelor of Fine Arts in painting and drawing, and completed her master's degree in Fine Arts at the University of Ulster in Belfast, Northern Ireland.

== Career ==
Fay's works include drawing, painting and installation projects, focused on themes of interconnectedness of natural phenomena, ecological systems, phenomenology and the lived environment, and the more-than-human, as well as, ideas of place and the representation of landscape She has been a part of the Saskatchewan arts community in a number of different ways including, curator, writer, mentor, and artist.

In 2004, the Landscape as Muse documentary series covered Fay's work alongside other artists such as Joe Fafard, Aganetha Dyck, Peter von Tiesenhausen and Edward Burtynsky.The documentary examines the work of Canadian artists and the relationships between art and landscape.

Fay won the CARFAC National Visual Arts Advocacy Award in 2016.

== Exhibitions ==
Fay has participated in a number of solo and group exhibitions across Canada, including the Mata Gallery, Art Gallery of Regina, and MacKenzie Art Gallery. Her works are held in permanent collections at the Saskatchewan Arts Board, MacKenzie Gallery, Dunlop Art Gallery, University of Regina, and City of Regina.

=== Solo exhibitions ===
- 2024 – Drawing Water, Slate Gallery, Regina, SK
- 2019 – Concurrent Views, Harcourt House, Edmonton, AB
- 2015 – Floating Worlds, Dunlop Gallery, Regina, SK
- 2012 – Systems, Art Gallery of Regina, Regina, SK. Discusses the relationship between human and plat systems.
- 2007 – In'Spiral, Neutral Ground, Regina, SK
- 2006 – Cover, MATA Gallery, Regina, SK
- 1997 – Translating Place, Mackenzie Art Gallery, Regina, SK

=== Group exhibitions ===
- 2024 – The Ecology of Freedom, Crow’s Nest Gallery, Baltimore,
- 2021 – I am Water, public art project, New York City, USA
- 2016 – Ecoart, Gallery 1313, Toronto, ON. This exhibition included artists whose works address environmental issues.
- 2014 – Paper Works, MATA Gallery, Regina, SK
- 2013 – Restoration, Art Gallery of Estevan, Estevan, SK
- 2013 – Embodied Presence, Prince Albert Arts Centre, Prince Albert, SK. In collaboration with Michel Boutin.

== Awards ==
Fay was awarded the National Visual Arts Advocacy Award in 2015."CARFAC"
