= Robert Boyer (artist) =

Canadian artist (1948-2004)

- Born: July 20, 1948
- Died: August 30, 2004 (aged 56)
- Citizenship: Métis Cree Canadian
- Known for: artist, academic

Robert Boyer RCA (July 20, 1948 – August 30, 2004) was a Canadian visual artist and university professor of aboriginal heritage. He was a Métis Cree artist known for his politically charged abstract paintings.

== Life and work ==
Boyer grew up in Prince Albert, Saskatchewan and earned a BEd from the Regina Campus of the University of Saskatchewan in 1971. He joined the Saskatchewan arts community in 1973 and worked on community programming at the Norman MacKenzie Art Gallery in Regina until the mid-1970s. He was then a professor of Indian Fine Arts at the Saskatchewan Indian Federated College ("SIFC") (now First Nations University of Canada), a federated college of the University of Saskatchewan, Regina Campus, later the University of Regina, until 1997. During his time at the SIFC, Boyer acted as the Head of the Department of Indian Fine Arts.

Boyer's early paintings use material such as acrylics, paper, and canvas. The earliest paintings are realistic, but he soon embarked on an effort to incorporate an abstract style in his work. One of the earliest results of this is "Horses Can Fly, Too," a representation of a horse-figure streaking through the sky. Boyer is well known for his large-scale geometric paintings on felt blankets that he produced primarily in the late 1980s and early 1990s. This began after a trip to China and Japan. He said, "There were paintings on silk or cloth and gradually this whole thing about art not having to be made on stretched canvas really began to get through to me." Boyer used oil paints applied thickly, using rough brush strokes in many of these works. The geometric designs on the blanket paintings come from the tradition motifs of Siouan and Cree groups in Western Canada. Boyer tended to use traditional colour combinations in early blanket paintings, but some later examples are painted in pastels.

At first Boyer painted about the wrong Europeans have done to Aboriginal peoples, but he later switched to things about the Aboriginal culture and the meaning of life. Boyer called all of this 'Blanket Statements'.

Many works from Boyer’s “Blanket Period” are held in the permanent collections of major institutions, including the National Gallery of Canada and the MacKenzie Art Gallery (formerly the Norman MacKenzie Gallery). Several of these paintings are characterized by distinctive and often enigmatic titles, some of which the artist stated were conceived following significant personal experiences, including participation in sweat lodge ceremonies.

Boyer's influences from aboriginal art traditions are obvious, but he was also influenced by local Saskatchewan artists such as Ted Godwin and Art McKay of the Regina Five, and to a lesser extent Joe Fafard. As a university professor and elder, Boyer mentored many young aboriginal and non-aboriginal artists.

Boyer died in 2004 while powwow dancing.

== Murals in the Royal Saskatchewan Museum ==
Boyer painted large murals in the First Nations Gallery of the Royal Saskatchewan Museum. A large mural forms part of the display of the winter camp in the "Seasonal Round" section of the Gallery.

== The Carousel of Life Mural ==
One of Boyer's larger works is the Carousel of Life mural, painted on the exterior west wall of the building located at 2941-13th Avenue in the Cathedral district of Regina, which is adjacent to the 13th Avenue Canada Safeway grocery store. It depicts four horses framed by one of Boyer's blankets. It was commissioned by the Cathedral Area Community Association in 1996, as part of the annual arts festival.

On August 2, 2011, the City of Regina announced that Safeway had applied for zoning changes to allow it to expand its 13th Avenue store. The Information Sheet for the proposed re-zoning application states that "... most of the flanking on the existing site will be lost to the grocery store expansion..." The Information Sheet does not state if the Boyer mural will be preserved in some fashion, or if Canada Safeway will destroy the mural as part of the expansion of its store.

The issue of the mural attracted some attention in a column in the local newspaper, and in letters to the editor.

== Selected major exhibitions (solo and group) ==
- Horses Fly Too, Norman MacKenzie Art Gallery, Regina, 1984.
- Bob Boyer: A Blanket Statement organized by the University of British Columbia Museum of Anthropology, Vancouver, 1988.
- In the Shadow of the Sun, Canadian Museum of Civilization, Ottawa, 1988.
- Shades of Difference: The Art of Bob Boyer, Edmonton Art Gallery, Edmonton, 1991.
- Indigena, Canadian Museum of Civilization, Ottawa, 1992.

== Honours ==
- Royal Canadian Academy of Arts
