= Roger Ing =

- Born: 1933; Canton, China
- Died: 22 July 2008; Regina, Saskatchewan
- Known for: painter, sculptor
- Movement: Rogerism, modernism, abstract art, postmodern art

Roger Ing (1933 – 22 July 2008) was a Chinese Canadian artist.

Born in Canton, China, he emigrated to Regina, Saskatchewan, Canada in 1950 at the age of 12.

Roger was well known as the owner of the New Utopia Cafe, a popular gathering place for locals and artists in Regina's North Central neighborhood. Through the 1980s and 90s, the New Utopia Cafe was a gathering place for Regina's visual artists including Regina Five artist Arthur McKay, sculptor Joe Fafard, multimedia artist Edward Poitras, painters Ernest Klinger, Sally Hui, Daniel E. Sali, Jack Severson and Lynda Walker and photographers Tom Bartlett and Jason Weedmark.

The New Utopia Cafe, besides functioning as a gathering place, served as an Art gallery showcasing Roger's artwork and functioned as Roger's painting studio.

Roger Ing was featured on the Much Music program, Mike & Mike's Excellent X-Canada Adventures.

In 1998, he was given a solo exhibition at the MacKenzie Art Gallery. The gallery also has two of Roger's works in their collection.
