= Leesa Streifler =

Canadian artist

- Born: 1957 (age 68–69); Winnipeg, Manitoba
- Education: University of Manitoba, Hunter College
- Known for: painting, drawing, photography

Leesa Streifler (born 1957) is a Canadian multi-disciplinary artist and art professor who lives in Winnipeg, Manitoba. Her works have been exhibited extensively in solo and group exhibitions, nationally and internationally, and appear in the permanent collection of the National Gallery of Canada and the Canadian Museum of Contemporary Photography.

== Career ==
Streifler was born in Winnipeg and received a Bachelor of Fine Arts Honours degree from the University of Manitoba in 1980 and a Master of Fine Arts from Hunter College in 1983. She lived in New York from 1980 to 1986. She began teaching in the Visual Arts Department at the University of Regina in 1986, teaching painting and drawing. She retired from teaching in 2019 and is a professor emerita.

== Work ==
Her artwork has been exhibited in the National Gallery of Canada, Canadian Museum of Contemporary Photography, Saskatchewan Arts Board, and Winnipeg Art Gallery.

Streifer's works are part of permanent collection of National Gallery of Canada Contemporary Mythology: Compassion (1989) a large-scale painted-over gelatin silver print was acquired by the National Gallery in 1993, Contained: Untitled (House) (2003), Contained: Candy Apple Pin-up (2003) and Contained: X-Ray Bunny (2003), three series of four 4 framed chromogenic prints, were purchased by the Canadian Museum of Contemporary Photography in 2005.

=== Exhibitions ===
Streifler's solo exhibitions include one at the MacKenzie Art Gallery in Regina.

Streifler has been in group exhibitions at the Kenderdine Art Gallery, University of Saskatchewan; Mendel Art Gallery, Saskatoon; MacKenzie Art Gallery, Regina; Dunlop Art Gallery, Regina; Canadian Museum of Contemporary Photography, National Gallery of Canada, Ottawa; University of Newfoundland; Beaverbrook Art Gallery, Fredericton; and Dunlop Art Gallery, Regina.
