= Martha Cole =

Canadian artist

- Born: 1946 (age 79–80); Regina, Saskatchewan
- Education: University of Toronto, University of Washington
- Known for: Textile artist, artist's book maker
- Awards: Saskatchewan Order of Merit; Lieutenant Governor's Lifetime Achievement Award Saskatchewan Arts Awards

Martha Cole SOM (born 1946 in Regina, Saskatchewan) is a Canadian artist. She is known for her work with textiles, landscape, and artist's books, addressing themes of inter-contentedness, sustainability, and protection of ecological diversity. She currently resides in Disley, Saskatchewan. Cole's high school art teacher, Helmut Becker (now professor emeritus at the University of Western Ontario) encouraged her to pursue a career in art. She was an instructor in the Extension Division, Fine Arts and Humanities, University of Regina.

Her work has represented Canada at the Yokohama Quilt Week in Japan, the Commonwealth Games in Vancouver, BC, the Assoc. of Pacific NW Quilters Biennial Showcase in Seattle, WA and at the prestigious Quilt National 2015 in Athens, Ohio. Her art is included in public collections of the Saskatchewan Arts Board, Mackenzie Art Gallery, the Government of Saskatchewan, and the City of Regina.

== Career ==
Martha Cole attended the University of Washington in Seattle where she received a Bachelor of Fine Arts in sculpture (1970). Cole worked as the slide librarian in the University of Toronto's Fine Arts Department after she moved back to Canada in 1970. She earned a Bachelor of Education in Art from the University of Toronto with a secondary focus in Librarianship (1972). She taught art at the high school level at a metropolitan Toronto school. In 1978, Cole moved back to Saskatchewan and bought the United Church in Disley, Saskatchewan. She began to create her first fabric landscapes in 1978, inspired by the surrounding countryside.

Cole has worked with fabric for the majority of her career. She has focused on the incorporation of traditional crafts such as sewing, embroidery and quilting into her artistic practice. Her first fabric-based exhibition was at the Rosemont Art Gallery, in Regina, Saskatchewan in 1984. In the 1980s, Cole also began to create artist's books. Two work by Cole are in the collection of the Mackenzie Art Gallery: Cygnus Spiral Arm of the Milky Way Galaxy (1986) and Elemental Blue: Water (2003)

In 2002, Cole was affected by the demolition of the elevator in Disley, which she realized was connected to the self-identification of people who have grown up on farms and small towns in the province. This led to the show "The Survivors," which toured in twenty-nine galleries in rural Saskatchewan in 2005. The primary images were grain elevators which are still standing in various towns around the province. It was during this time that Cole toured the province as part of the Saskatchewan Centennial celebrations, presenting her quilted works and teaching classes.

Cole was one of four artists that constructed All Beings Confluence, a collaborative work a community-based, interactive art installation grounded in "social activism and creating connections." Cole, in addition to artists Shannon Carson, Madeline Lepage, and Fenella Temmerman came up with the exhibition, which was inspired by a song by Carolyn McDade, who is a composer, social activist, and environmentalist. The project began in 2010 and has been shown in more than 50 venues across North America.

== Awards ==
In 2017, Cole was awarded the Saskatchewan Order of Merit for her contributions to the province. In 2019, she was awarded the Lieutenant Governor's Lifetime Achievement Award.

== Exhibitions ==
- "All Beings Confluence," group exhibition with Shannon Carson, Madeline Lepage, and Fenella Temmerman, 2010.
- "The Survivors" Touring Exhibition, Organization of Saskatchewan Arts Councils. Twenty-seven venues across the province, 2005-2007.
- "Envisioning the Whole" Exhibition, McKenzie Art Gallery, Regina, 2005.
- Yokohama Quilt Week Exhibition, Patchwork Quilt Tsushin, Yokohama, Japan, 2005
- "Surviving as an artist: Martha Cole" one hour video produced by Bird Song Communications, 2003.
- "CanadaScapes" Exhibition, Laconner Quilt Museum, Laconner, WA, USA, 1999.
- "In Context: The Saskatchewan Landscape Exhibition" (2 Person), 3 venues: Saskatoon, St. John's, Newfoundland, Winnipeg, 1998-99.
- "Canada, A Cultural Mosaic" Exhibition, Atlanta, GA, USA, 1998. Commonwealth Conference Exhibition, Cartwright Gallery, Vancouver, 1987.
