= Ron Bloore =

Canadian painter

- Born: Ronald Langley Bloore; May 29, 1925; Brampton, Ontario, Canada
- Died: September 4, 2009 (aged 84); Toronto, Ontario, Canada
- Known for: abstract art
- Movement: Regina Five
- Spouse: 1. Dorothy Wahn 2. Dorothy Cameron
- Awards: Order of Canada

Ronald Langley Bloore, CM D.Litt LL. D. FRSC (May 29, 1925 – September 4, 2009) was a Canadian abstract artist and teacher. He was a member of the Regina Five.

== Education ==
Born in Brampton, Ontario, Bloore received a B.A. in art and archaeology from the University of Toronto in 1949. From 1949 to 1951, he studied art history and archaeology at the New York University Institute of Fine Arts. In 1953, he received a M.A. in art and archaeology from Washington University in St. Louis. From 1951 to 1954, he was also an instructor in art and archaeology at Washington University. From 1955 to 1957, he studied at the Courtauld Institute of Art at the University of London.

== Career ==
After completing his studies at the University of London, Bloore returned to Canada, and held a position as an instructor in art and archaeology at the University of Toronto from 1957 to 1958. Moving to Regina, Saskatchewan, he was director at the Norman Mackenzie Gallery (today's MacKenzie Art Gallery) of Regina College and an instructor in art and archaeology at the Regina Campus of the University of Saskatchewan from 1958 to 1966. While there, Bloore exhibited with Ken Lochhead, Art McKay, Ted Godwin and Douglas Morton in the National Gallery of Canada's Five Painters from Regina show in 1961.

The Regina Five, as it came to be called, lasted only a short time. Their work was more geometrically ordered than the painters in Toronto in Painters Eleven. But Bloore quarreled with McKay over "his" use of the circle and by 1964, however, the group had split up. Settling back in Toronto, he was director of art and a professor in the Faculty of Arts and Faculty of Fine Arts at York University from 1966 to 1990. In his work, he concentrated on a white-on-white technique. which built on one of his own paintings of 1960, combined with his knowledge of non-Western cultures. In 1965 and 1966, he created White on White, a mural for the entranceway of the Confederation Centre Art Gallery in Charlottetown, installed in 1967. It consists of layers of white oil paint in different shades, finishes and surfaces, and was conserved and re-installed in 2019.

Bloore was also a writer, and brought the career of folk artist Jan Gerrit Wyers to critical attention, among other subjects.

== Honours and awards ==
In 1967, Bloore was awarded the Centennial Medal and the Jubilee Medal. In 1972, he received the Victor Martyn Lynch-Staunton Award. In 1993, he was made a Member of the Order of Canada for being a "most accomplished abstract painter and educator, he has strongly influenced visual arts, particularly in Western Canada". In 1993, he also was awarded an honorary Doctor of Letters degree from York University and in 2001 an honorary Doctor of Laws degree with the other members of the Regina Five from the University of Regina. In 2007, he was made a Fellow of the Royal Society of Canada.
