= Theresa Beckie =

Canadian nurse

- Born: 1957 (age 68–69); Saskatoon, Saskatchewan, Canada

Academic background
- Education: BSN, 1985, University of Saskatchewan; MN, PhD, 1994, University of Alberta
- Thesis: Quality of life after coronary artery bypass graft surgery (1994)

Academic work
- Institutions: University of South Florida College of Nursing
- Main interests: Cardiology

Theresa M. Beckie (born 1957) is a Canadian nurse. She is a Professor of Nursing Science at the University of South Florida College of Nursing.

== Early life and education ==
Beckie was born in 1957. She grew up on a farm in Saskatoon, Saskatchewan and remained in the province for her Bachelor of Science in Nursing at the University of Saskatchewan. She then enrolled at the University of Alberta for her Master's degree and PhD. She completed her training in the coronary care unit at the University of Alberta Hospital.

== Career ==
As a professor at the University of South Florida College of Nursing (USF) in 2003, Beckie designed the first United States-based women-specific cardiac rehabilitation program. She subsequently received the 2004 USF Women's Leadership Award and became a member of the American College of Cardiology. In 2024, Beckie was elected a Fellow of the American Association for the Advancement of Science for "pioneering research in the field cardiovascular sciences, particularly for developing, implementing, and evaluating a gender-specific, cardiac rehabilitation program for women with coronary heart disease."
