= List of people from Saskatoon =

This is a list of notable persons who were born, grew up, resided or lived in Saskatoon.

== A ==
- Mark Abley – writer
- Hugh Alan Anderson (1933–2015) – Canadian politician, member of the Canadian Parliament
- Mel Angelstad – former professional ice hockey player
- Colby Armstrong – former National Hockey League (NHL) player, currently hockey analyst with Sportsnet
- Riley Armstrong – former hockey player, played two games in the NHL with San Jose Sharks
- Brent Ashton – former NHL hockey player

== B ==
- Mike Babcock – former head ice hockey coach
- Lorne Babiuk – former director, VIDO-InterVac
- Jon Ballantyne – two-time Juno Award-winning jazz pianist and composer
- C. Donald Bateman – inventor of the ground proximity warning system (GPWS)
- Theresa Beckie – nurse and fellow of the American Association for the Advancement of Science
- Wade Belak (1976–2011) – former NHL player with Nashville Predators
- Frederick E. Betts (1870–1942) – president of the Canadian Amateur Hockey Association
- Byron Bitz – former NHL player with Boston Bruins and Florida Panthers
- Trevor Blackwell – entrepreneur
- Allan Blakeney – former premier of Saskatchewan
- Derek Boogaard (1982–2011) – former NHL hockey player with New York Rangers
- Dave Brown – former NHL player with Philadelphia Flyers and Edmonton Oilers
- Sidney Buckwold – former mayor of Saskatoon
- Hy Buller (1926–1968) – All Star NHL ice hockey player

== C ==
- Hugh Cairns – World War I soldier awarded the Victoria Cross
- Lorne Calvert – former premier of Saskatchewan
- Steph Cameron – folk singer-songwriter
- Ethel Catherwood – Olympic medalist
- Dmytro Cipywnyk – physician and academic
- Emily Clark – ice hockey player
- Kim Coates – Canadian/American actor, Sons of Anarchy; born in Saskatoon
- Renée Coleman – Canadian actress
- David Curie (VC) – World War II soldier awarded the Victoria Cross

== D ==
- Mark Dacey – 2004 Brier Champion
- Joyce Davidson – TV personality
- Kissy Duerré – TikToker and activist

== E ==
- Michael Eklund – actor
- Dan Ellis – NHL goaltender with Florida Panthers
- Shane Endicott – former NHL hockey player
- Todd Ewen – former NHL player with St.Louis Blues and Anaheim Mighty Ducks

== F ==
- Sylvia Fedoruk – scientist, former lieutenant governor of Saskatchewan
- Larry Fisher – murderer of Gail Miller
- Don Freed – singer-songwriter
- Dawna Friesen – newscaster
- Pete Friesen – guitar player for Alice Cooper, Bruce Dickinson of Iron Maiden and The Almighty
- Gayleen Froese – author
- Wes Funk – writer

== G ==
- Michael Garnett – former NHL goaltender with the Atlanta Thrashers
- George Genereux – trap shooter, sharpshooter
- Joanna Glass – playwright
- Glenda Goertzen – author
- Bruce Gordon
- Herb Grosch – computer scientist
- Tom Grummett – comic book artist
- Eric Gryba – NHL player with the Edmonton Oilers
- Lyell Gustin – music educator

== H ==
- Brandon Hagel – professional ice hockey player
- Chris Hajt – professional ice hockey player, Lukko
- Emmett Hall – former Supreme Court justice
- Stu Hart (1915–2003) – professional wrestling patriarch
- Ray Hnatyshyn – former governor general of Canada
- Robert Hodges – PhD in biochemistry, former Olympic speed skater (1968, 1972)
- Gordie Howe (1928–2016) – NHL and WHA hockey player
- Bill Hunter (1920–2002) – ice hockey entrepreneur
- Jorgen Hus – Saskatchewan Roughriders Football player

== J ==
- Susan Jacks – singer-songwriter, producer, member of The Poppy Family

== K ==
- Miklos Kanitz – Holocaust survivor
- Ryan Keller – former NHL hockey player for the Ottawa Senators
- Dave King – university and NHL hockey coach
- Ken Kirzinger – actor and stuntman, played Jason Voorhees in Freddy vs. Jason
- Darcy Kuemper – goalie for the NHL franchise Washington Capitals
- Kaylyn Kyle – member of the Canada women's national soccer team

== L ==
- Alison Lang – Canadian Olympic basketball player
- Annette Lapointe – writer
- Regan Lauscher – Canadian luge champion
- James Le Jeune (1910–1983) – painter, born in Saskatoon
- Catriona Le May Doan – speed skater, Olympic medalist
- Taylor Leier – former NHL hockey player having played with the Philadelphia Flyers, now playing in Europe
- Chelazon Leroux – drag performer seen on Canada's Drag Race (season 3)
- Curtis Leschyshyn – former NHL hockey player
- Ernest Lindner (1897–1988) – painter
- Trey Lyles – professional basketball player
- Vic Lynn (1925–2010) – ice hockey player

== M ==
- Stony Mac – drag performer, appeared on Call Me Mother (season 2)
- Duncan MacPherson (1966–1989) – ice hockey player
- Keith Magnuson (died 2003) – former NHL hockey player, Chicago Blackhawks
- Tyler Mane – former pro wrestler and actor
- Yann Martel – Booker Prize-winning author
- Daniel Mason – novelist and physician
- Mike Maurer – CFL fullback
- Chris McAllister – former NHL hockey player
- Shane Meier – actor
- Burt Metcalfe – television producer, director, screenwriter, and actor
- David Milgaard – falsely accused/convicted/imprisoned for murder of Gail Miller
- Gail Miller – victim of murder by Larry Fisher, for which David Milgaard was falsely convicted
- Joni Mitchell – musician, artist
- Allan Moffat – racing car driver (based in Australia); 12 Hours of Sebring winner and four-time winner of the Australian Touring Car Championship and Bathurst 1000
- Keith Morrison – Dateline NBC correspondent
- Farley Mowat – novelist
- Jasmin Mozaffari – film director and screenwriter
- Alaa Murabit – doctor, global strategist and policymaker
- Cianna Murray – ice hockey referee

== N ==
- Carey Nelson – long-distance runner
- Darin Nesbitt – professor at Douglas College

== P ==
- Lane Pederson – NHL player
- Michaela Pereira – HLN anchor
- Krista Phillips – professional basketball player (former University of Michigan women's basketball player)
- Rich Pilon – former NHL hockey player
- "Rowdy" Roddy Piper (died 2015) – professional wrestler and film actor

== R ==
- Doug Redl – Canadian football player
- Scott Redl – Canadian football player
- Drew Remenda – TV colour analyst for the San Jose Sharks and radio show host
- Kyle Riabko – actor and musician
- Roy Romanow – former premier of Saskatchewan

== S ==
- William Sarjeant – geology professor and author
- Brayden Schenn – NHL hockey player with St. Louis Blues
- Luke Schenn – NHL hockey player with Toronto Maple Leafs
- Nathan Simington – commissioner of FCC
- Brian Skrudland – former NHL hockey forward, two-time Stanley Cup champion
- Arthur Slade – author
- Theresa Sokyrka – singer-songwriter, musician, and placed second on season 2 of Canadian Idol
- Brent Sopel – NHL hockey player with Atlanta Thrashers
- Chandler Stephenson – NHL hockey player with Seattle Kraken
- Jarret Stoll – NHL hockey player with Los Angeles Kings
- Neil Stonechild – high-profile victim of an alleged starlight tour
- Joey Stylez (Joseph Laplante) – hip hop artist
- David Sutcliffe – actor
- Anne Szumigalski – poet

== T ==
- Brianne Theisen-Eaton – twice World Athletics Championships silver medalist in heptathlon
- Gordon Tootoosis – First Nations actor
- Katie Tupper – singer-songwriter
- Shannon Tweed – actress, wife of Gene Simmons of Kiss

== V ==
- Guy Vanderhaeghe – author
- Sugith Varughese – writer, director and actor
- Suzie Vinnick – folk/blues singer-songwriter and guitarist
- Julia Voth – actress and model

== W ==
- Cam Ward – NHL hockey goaltender, Chicago Blackhawks
- Ed Whalen – host and commentator, Stampede Wrestling
- Steven Woods – Quack.com co-founder, current Google Waterloo site director
- Henry Woolf – actor
- James Wright – ice hockey player, plays in the Swedish Hockey League for the Linköpings HC, formerly in the NHL for the Winnipeg Jets and the Tampa Bay Lightning
- Janet Wright (1945–2016) – actress and cast member of Corner Gas
- Larry Wruck – CFL player

== See also ==
- List of people from Prince Albert, Saskatchewan
- List of people from Regina, Saskatchewan
