= Kenneth Lochhead =

Canadian professor and painter

- Born: Kenneth Campbell Lochhead; May 22, 1926; Ottawa, Ontario, Canada
- Died: July 15, 2006 (aged 80); Ottawa, Ontario, Canada
- Movement: Regina Five
- Awards: Order of Canada

Kenneth Campbell Lochhead, OC RCA L.L. D. (May 22, 1926 – July 15, 2006) was a professor and painter. He was the brother of poet Douglas Lochhead.

== Career ==
Born in Ottawa, Ontario, Lochhead attended the Summer Art School at Queen's University in 1944. From 1945 to 1948, he attended the Pennsylvania Academy of the Fine Arts in Philadelphia. From 1946 to 1948, he studied at the Barnes Foundation near Philadelphia.

From 1950 to 1964, he was the director of the School of Art at the University of Saskatchewan — Regina Campus. Among his pupils there was Joan Rankin. His art work in this early period was Surrealist as well as abstract (he bounced between the two). He was commissioned to do two murals in his surrealist mode, one for the airport in Gander, Newfoundland, one for the Royal Canadian Legion branch in Regina (1955–1956), a "major artistic achievement".

Lochhead was the co-founder with McKay of the Emma Lake Artists' Workshops in 1955 and attended the 1959 visit of Barnett Newman, followed by a reappraisal of his art. In 1961, he exhibited his abstract paintings as part of the Regina Five at the National Gallery of Canada with Art McKay, Ron Bloore, Ted Godwin, and Douglas Morton. Along with McKay, he was included in Clement Greenberg's 1964 Post-Painterly Abstraction exhibition. By 1968, Lochhead was painting abstract work that let the painting "breathe" by leaving margins of unpainted canvas between the colours.

From 1964 to 1973, he was an associate professor in the School of Fine Arts at the University of Manitoba. From 1973 to 1975, he was a professor in the Department of Visual Arts, Faculty of Fine Arts at York University. From 1975 to 1989, he was a professor in the Department of Visual Arts at the University of Ottawa.

In 1970, he was made an Officer of the Order of Canada "for his contribution to the development of painting, especially in Western Canada, as an artist and teacher". In 2006, he was awarded the Governor General's Awards in Visual and Media Arts. He was made a member of the Royal Canadian Academy of Arts

In 2005, Ted Fraser curated the exhibition titled Kenneth Lochhead: Garden of Light for the MacKenzie Art Gallery in Regina. Lochhead died of colorectal cancer in Ottawa in 2006.

== Books illustrated ==
- Looking into Trees (Sackville NB: Sybertooth, 2009) ISBN 978-0-9810244-3-1

== Honours and memberships ==
- Officer of the Order of Canada;
- Honorary Doctor of Laws, University of Regina with the other members of the Regina Five (2001);
