= Ted Godwin =

- Born: August 13, 1933; Calgary, Alberta, Canada
- Died: January 3, 2013 (aged 79); Calgary, Alberta, Canada
- Spouse: Phyllis Gotta
- Awards: Order of Canada

Edward W. (Ted) Godwin, CM RCA L.L. D (August 13, 1933 – January 3, 2013) was the youngest member of the Regina Five, a group of five artists (Ken Lochhead, Art McKay, Ron Bloore and Douglas Morton) all based in Regina, Saskatchewan in 1961 when the group got its name from a show held by the National Gallery of Canada. Godwin is also known for his so-called Tartan paintings of the late 1960s and 1970s.

== Career ==
Born in Calgary, Alberta, he attended the Southern Alberta Institute of Technology and Art from 1951 to 1955. He also attended several Emma Lake Artists' Workshops, including those led by Barnett Newman (1959), John Ferren (1960), Jules Olitski (1964), and Lawrence Alloway (1965). From 1955 to 1964 he worked in commercial art. In 1962–1963, he spent the year sketching and painting in Greece on a Canada Council grant. From 1964 to 1985, he taught at the Faculty of Fine Art, University of Saskatchewan (Regina campus) which later became the University of Regina.

His work went through several phases, from the abstract paintings of his Regina Five years (1958–1968) to his Tartan paintings of the late 1960s and 1970s, to his later representational landscapes. Godwin has had over sixty solo exhibitions beginning in 1958 and his group exhibition history began in 1955 and spanned fifty years. In 1999, The Nickle Arts Museum of Calgary mounted and toured a major examination of Godwin's Tartans. In 2008, a show titled Ted Godwin, The Regina Five Years, 1958–1968 was held at the Nickle. His work is represented by major institutions across Canada, including The National Gallery of Canada, the Art Gallery of Ontario, the Canada Council Art Bank, the Art Gallery of Hamilton, the University of Regina, the MacKenzie Art Gallery, and the Confederation Centre Art Gallery. He is represented by: Wallace Galleries, Calgary; Mayberry Fine Art, Winnipeg; Assiniboia Gallery, Regina; and Bau-Xi Gallery, Vancouver.

In 2001, a documentary was made about the Regina Five, titled A World Away: Stories from the Regina Five in which Godwin appears.

== Publications ==
- Godwin, Ted (1999). Messages from the Real World A Professional Handbook for the Emerging Artist. Regina: Canadian Plains Research Center.

== Honours ==
- Queen Elizabeth Silver Jubilee Medal (1978)
- Saskatchewan Book Award for Messages from the Real World A Professional Handbook for the Emerging Artist as the best new publication (Educational) (1999)
- Honorary Doctorate from the University of Regina (2001)
- Officer of the Order of Canada (2004)
- Queen Elizabeth II’s Diamond Jubilee Medal (2012)
- Board of Governors Award of Excellence, Alberta College of Art and Design
- Royal Canadian Academy of Arts
