= Ópályi =

- Coat of arms

- Location within Hungary
- Coordinates: 48°00′N 22°19′E
- Country: Hungary
- County: Szabolcs-Szatmár-Bereg

Government
  - Mayor: Dr. Bálint Albert (Ind.)

Area
  - Total: 26.72 km^{2} (10.32 sq mi)

Population (2022)
  - Total: 2,894
  - Density: 108.3/km^{2} (280.5/sq mi)
- Time zone: UTC+1 (CET)
  - Summer (DST): UTC+2 (CEST)
- Postal code: 4821
- Area code: 44

Ópályi is a village in Szabolcs-Szatmár-Bereg county, in the Northern Great Plain region of eastern Hungary.

== Geography ==
It covers an area of 26.72 km^{2} (10 sq mi) and has a population of 2894 people (2022).
