= Cory Harrower =

Canadian wheelchair basketball player

Personal information
- Nationality: Canada
- Born: July 20, 1989 (age 36) Regina, Saskatchewan
- Height: 5 ft 4 in (1.63 m)

Sport
- Club: Regina Paratroopers
Medal record
Athletics
World Junior Athletics Championships
| Bronze medal – third place | 2006 World Junior Athletics Championships | Women's wheelchair basketball |
| Bronze medal – third place | 2006 World Junior Athletics Championships | Women's wheelchair basketball |
| Bronze medal – third place | 2006 World Junior Athletics Championships | Women's wheelchair basketball |
| Bronze medal – third place | 2006 World Junior Athletics Championships | Women's wheelchair basketball |
| Bronze medal – third place | 2006 Junior National Championships | Women's wheelchair basketball |
| Bronze medal – third place | 2007 Canada Games | Women's wheelchair basketball |

Cory Harrower (born July 20, 1989) is a Canadian Paralympic wheelchair basketball player.

== Biography ==
Harrower was born on July 20, 1989, in Regina, Saskatchewan with cerebral palsy. Between 2006 and 2007 she got 6 bronze medals in total. She won 2 bronze medals in 2006 and 2007 respectively, one of which was from Canada Games, while the other was from Junior National Championships. She also got 4 more bronze medals from World Junior Athletics Championships in 2006. Besides basketball she also plays do track and wheelchair rugby. Aside from playing rugby, she is also a member of the Canadian national wheelchair rugby team. 2007 brought her a Saskatchewan Youth Award. Harrower also used to appear in certain TV episodes of Corner Gas and on Renegadepress.com site.
