= Wayne Pyne =

Profile
- Positions: Tackle, Guard

Personal information
- Born: December 24, 1917; Regina, Saskatchewan
- Died: October 11, 2004 (aged 86); Regina, Saskatchewan
- Listed height: 6 ft 1 in (1.85 m)
- Listed weight: 200 lb (91 kg)

Career history
- 1946–1953: Saskatchewan Roughriders

Wayne F. Pyne (December 24, 1917 – October 11, 2004) was a Canadian professional football player who played for the Saskatchewan Roughriders. He played junior football in Regina.
