= University of South Florida College of Nursing =

Public nursing school in Tampa, Florida, US

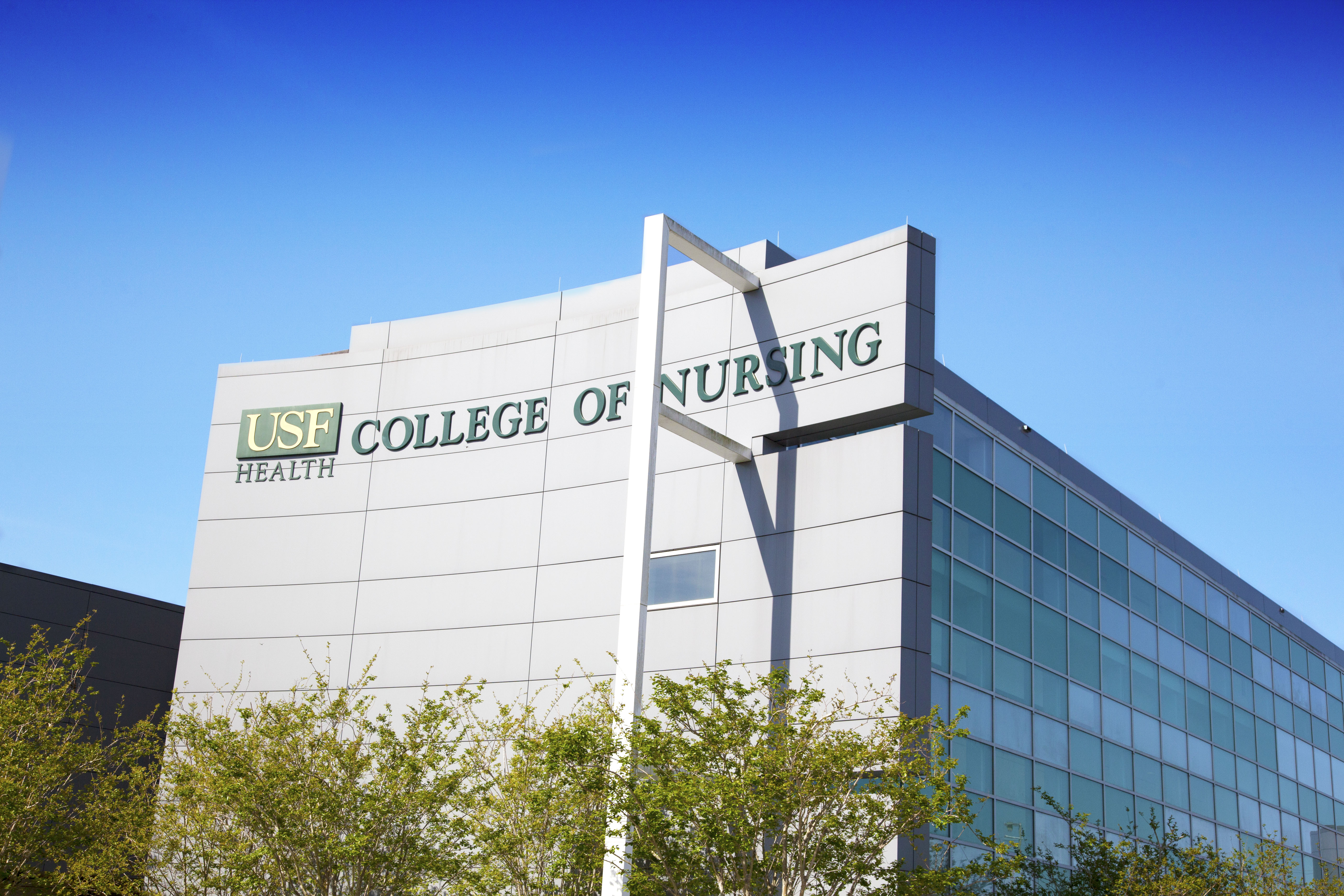
- Type: Public
- Established: 1973
- Dean: Usha Menon, PhD, RN, FAAN
- Location: Tampa, Florida, USA
- Campus: Urban
- Website: http://health.usf.edu/nursing/

The University of South Florida College of Nursing educates nurses at multiple levels from baccalaureate through doctoral degrees. It is one of 14 colleges at the University of South Florida. The college has three campuses: Tampa, St. Petersburg, and Sarasota-Manatee.

== Academics ==
The USF College of Nursing was founded in 1973, enrolling its charter class into the Bachelor of Science in Nursing (BSN) program. The college added a Master of Science in Nursing program in 1980, a Doctor of Philosophy (PhD) program in 1997, and a Doctor of Nursing Practice (DNP) program in 2005.

The BSN program has expanded to include an accelerated second bachelor's sequence, which is offered at its three campuses: Tampa, St. Petersburg, and Sarasota-Manatee. The VBSN V-CARE program was created to allow veteran medics and corpsmen to become nurses.

The Master of Science in Nursing (MSN) program offers concentrations in adult gerontology primary care, adult gerontology acute care, family health, nursing education, occupational health/adult-gerontology primary care, and pediatric health, as well as a concurrent Master of Public Health/MSN in adult-gerontology primary care.

The USF College of Nursing has two doctoral programs: PhD and the DNP. The PhD program prepares nurse scientists to conduct research, publish scholarly work, and conduct faculty activities at research intensive universities. The DNP program was the first such program approved by the Florida Board of Governors, and provides advanced practice residency opportunities in primary care. The DNP in Nurse Anesthesia prepares students to become certified registered nurse anesthetists (CRNAs).

== Teaching Affiliates ==
Hospitals affiliating with the college include but are not limited to: Tampa General Hospital, Florida Hospital Tampa, St. Joseph's Hospital, Bayfront Medical Center, All Children's Hospital, James A. Haley Veterans’ Hospital, Shriners Hospitals for Children, Morton Plant Hospital, Moffitt Cancer Center & Research Institute, South Florida Baptist Hospital, and Sarasota Memorial Hospital.

The USF College of Nursing maintains more than 1,000 health care affiliations throughout Florida to provide clinical experiences at the baccalaureate, master's, and doctoral levels.

== USF Health ==
USF Health is the partnership of the Morsani College of Medicine, the College of Nursing, the College of Public Health, the Taneja College of Pharmacy, the School of Biomedical Sciences and the School of Physical Therapy and Rehabilitation Sciences, as well as the USF Physicians Group.
