= Marguerite Jones =

Canadian baseball player

- Pitcher
- Born: November 3, 1917; Regina, Saskatchewan, Canada
- Died: May 9, 1995 (aged 77); Moose Jaw, Saskatchewan, Canada
- Batted: Right Threw: Right

Teams
- Minneapolis Millerettes (1944); Rockford Peaches (1944)

Career highlights and awards
- Canadian Baseball Hall of Fame and Museum Honorary Induction (1998); Women in Baseball – AAGPBL Permanent Display at Baseball Hall of Fame and Museum (1988)

Marguerite Jones (later Davis; November 3, 1917 – May 9, 1995) was a Canadian pitcher who played in the All-American Girls Professional Baseball League (AAGPBL). Listed at 5' 9", 150 lb., she batted and threw right handed.

Born in Regina, Saskatchewan, Marguerite Jones was one of the 68 girls from Canada who played in the All-American Girls Professional Baseball League during its 12-year history.

Jones pitched in the league during the 1944 season. She opened the year with the Minneapolis Millerettes and was traded to the Rockford Peaches in the midseason, posting a combined record of 6-12 and a 3.70 earned run average in 28 pitching appearances. Even though she batted a meager .162 average in 33 games, Jones walked 24 times to collect a solid .387 on-base percentage and also swiped 25 bases.

Jones returned to Canada during the offseason to marry Gordon Davis in 1945. She then left the league behind and played softball in Regina for several years, while raising a family of four children: Ron, Jerry, Carol and Tom. By 1958, the family moved to Moose Jaw. She was widowed in 1985.

Marguerite, who earned the nickname ″The Lady″ because of her sweet and gentle temperament, rejoined her former teammates and opponents during the inaugural ceremony of Women in Baseball at the Baseball Hall of Fame and Museum in Cooperstown, New York. This permanent display was unveiled in 1988 to honor the entire All-American Girls Professional Baseball League rather than any individual figure.

She later developed Alzheimer's disease, and died in 1995 at the age of 77. "As her short time memory failed, her long term memory actually improved for a while", explained her son, Ron. "Among her most cherished memories was her time in the AAGPBL and the sport she loved", he added.

Three years after her death, Marguerite gained honorary induction into the Canadian Baseball Hall of Fame.

== Career statistics ==
Pitching

GP	W	L	W-L%	ERA	IP	H	RA	ER	BB	SO	HBP	WP	WHIP
28	6	12	.333	3.70	175	150	122	72	24	1	6	2	0.99

Batting

GP	AB	R	H	2B	3B	HR	RBI	SB	TB	BB	SO	BA	OBP	SLG
33	68	4	11	1	1	0	6	27	14	25	20	.162	.387	.206

Fielding

GP	PO	A	E	TC	DP	FA
28	10	71	7	88	1	.920
