= Dione Taylor =

Canadian blues/roots singer-songwriter

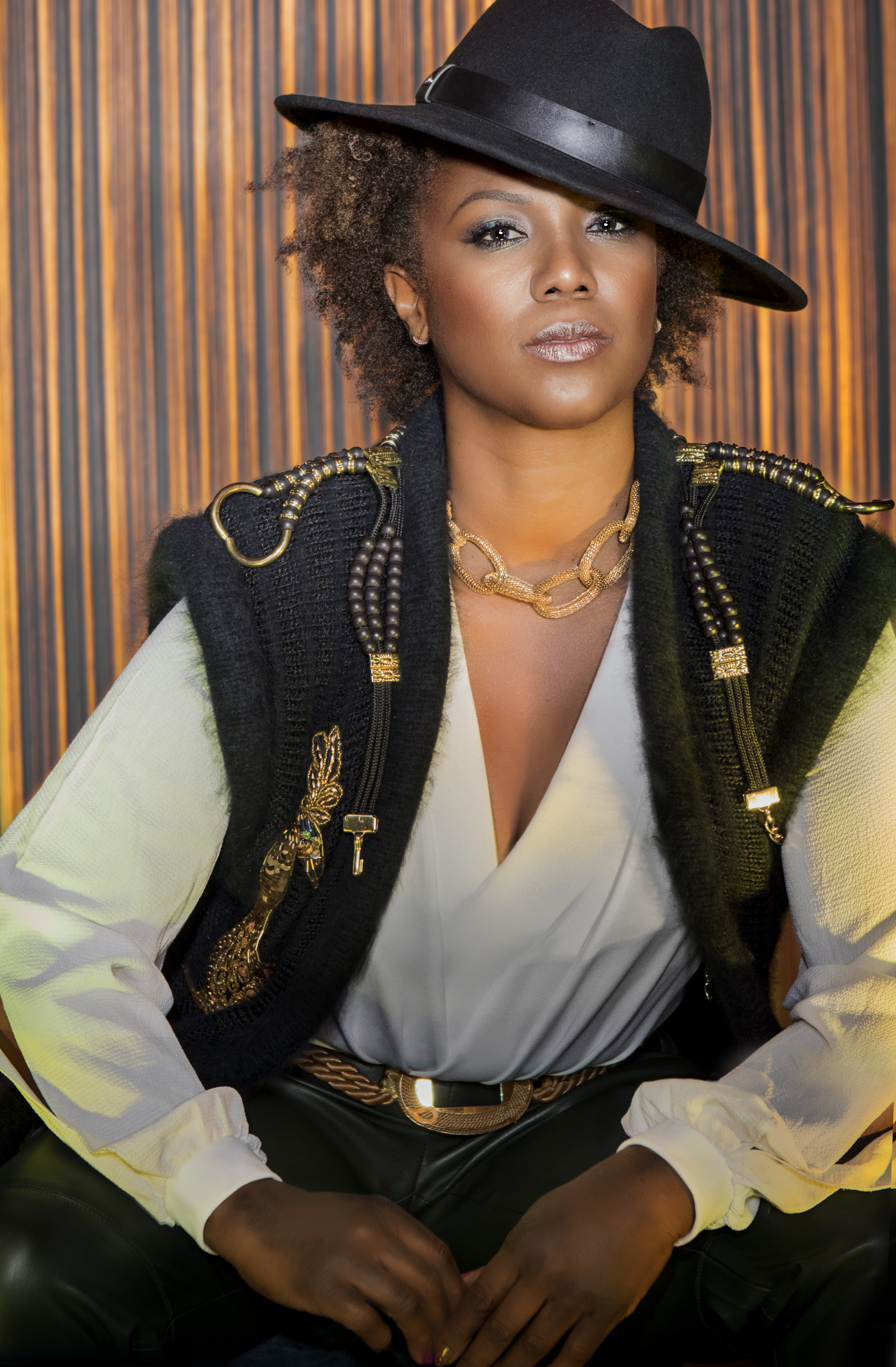

Background information
- Born: Regina, Saskatchewan, Canada
- Genres: Jazz, Blues, Soul
- Occupation: Singer
- Years active: 2004–present
- Website: dionetaylor.com

Dione Taylor is a Canadian blues, roots, soul and jazz singer/songwriter, born and raised in Regina, Saskatchewan. Dione calls her music the “Prairie Blues”, which is a mixture of Roots, Blues, Gospel and Americana. She is influenced by vocalists such as Aretha Franklin, Sister Rosetta Tharpe, Son House and Sarah Vaughan. She released her first album, Open Your Eyes, in 2004, and it was nominated for Vocal Jazz Album of the Year at the Juno Awards of 2005.

== Biography ==
Dione Taylor is a pastor's daughter, born and raised in a family she describes as “really connected to the gift of song." She began playing the organ at age 4, and at age 10 became musical director and organist at The Shiloh Assembly Church (Apostolic) in Regina. Taylor received two Voice Scholarships upon high school graduation.

Dione attended the University of Regina, where she majored in Voice (Classical and Opera). She then enrolled in the jazz program at the Humber College of Applied Arts and Technology, where she received the college's Thomas Kehoe Memorial Award for Outstanding Vocal Performance, graduating with honors from the program in 2003. While completing those studies, she entered the “Jazz and the New Generation” program, an international competition for jazz students, and was selected as of one of six students to participate. Led by Dr. Billy Taylor, the program was sponsored by The Kennedy Center in Washington D.C.

== Performances and awards ==
In June 2004, two weeks after releasing her debut CD, she was invited to participate in a concert celebrating Black Music Month in the United States at the White House for President George W. Bush and First Lady Laura Bush. Less than a year later she performed alongside other stars for Queen Elizabeth II, the Duke of Edinburgh and Joni Mitchell at the Saskatchewan Centennial Gala of the Arts. Other notable appearances include the 2005 Nightlife Jazz Tour, the Women's Blues Revue at Toronto's famed Massey Hall and the 2005 Festival International de Jazz de Montreal. In November 2006, Taylor performed “The Weight” for Robbie Robertson of The Band at the Governor General's Performing Arts Awards Gala in tribute and recognition of his Lifetime Artistic Achievement Award. Dione was nominated for a Gemini Award for her rendition of Oscar Peterson's “Hymn to Freedom,” which she performed alongside Oliver Jones at the Canadian Songwriters Hall of Fame Gala, which was broadcast on CTV. Taylor is also the recipient of the Governor General's Performing Arts Award Mentorship Program.

== Discography ==
Open Your Eyes	2004
I Love Being Here With You	2008
Born Free	2015
Hymn To Freedom - Single	2018
Spirits In The Water	2020
