= Paul Owen =

Canadian cricketer (1969–2020)

Personal information
- Full name: Paul Andrew Owen
- Born: 9 June 1969; Regina, Saskatchewan, Canada
- Died: 9 June 2020 (aged 51)
- Batting: Right-handed
- Bowling: Slow left-arm orthodox

Domestic team information
- Years: Team
- 1990: Gloucestershire
- 1989–1996: Bedfordshire

Career statistics
Competition	First-class
Matches	3
Runs scored	2
Batting average	1.00
100s/50s	–/–
Top score	1
Balls bowled	342
Wickets	4
Bowling average	59.75
5 wickets in innings	–
10 wickets in match	–
Best bowling	2/37
Catches/stumpings	–/–
- Source: CricketArchive, 26 June 2020

Paul Andrew Owen (9 June 1969 – 9 June 2020) was a Canadian cricketer. Owen was a right-handed batsman who bowled slow left-arm orthodox.

Owen, who had been educated at Bedford Modern School, began his county cricket career in England with Bedfordshire, making his debut for the county in the 1989 Minor Counties Championship against Norfolk. In 1990 he joined Gloucestershire, making three first-class appearances in that season against Yorkshire, Northamptonshire, and Surrey. A bowler, Owen took 4 wickets at an average of 59.75, with best figures of 2/37. 1990 was his only season with Gloucestershire, the following year he returned to playing Minor counties cricket for Bedfordshire. He played for the county until 1996, making a total of 29 Minor Counties Championship appearances.
