= Logan Pyett =

Canadian ice hockey player (born 1988)

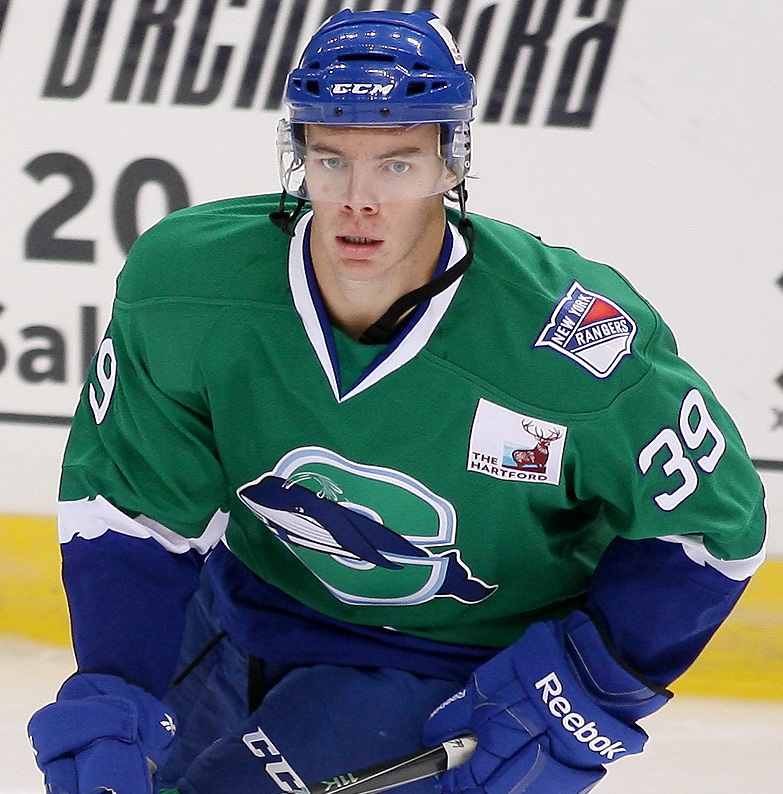
- Pyett with the Connecticut Whale in 2012
- Born: May 26, 1988 (age 38) Milestone, Saskatchewan, Canada
- Height: 5 ft 11 in (180 cm)
- Weight: 198 lb (90 kg; 14 st 2 lb)
- Position: Defence
- Shoots: Right
- Erste team Former teams: HSC Csíkszereda; Grand Rapids Griffins; Connecticut Whale; Vityaz Podolsk; Admiral Vladivostok; Severstal Cherepovets; Hershey Bears; KooKoo; Frederikshavn White Hawks
- NHL draft: 212th overall, 2006; Detroit Red Wings
- Playing career: 2008–present

Logan Pyett (born May 26, 1988) is a Canadian professional ice hockey defenceman who is currently playing for HSC Csíkszereda in the Erste Liga. Pyett was drafted by the Detroit Red Wings in the seventh round of the 2006 NHL entry draft, 212th overall.

== Playing career ==
Pyett played major junior hockey with the Regina Pats in the Western Hockey League (WHL). He was also selected to play for Canada at the 2008 World Junior Ice Hockey Championships winning the Gold Medal. On May 24, 2008, Pyett was signed to a three-year, entry-level contract with his draft club, the Detroit Red Wings.

After four seasons within the Red Wings organization, Pyett was not tendered a qualifying offer and as a free agent Pyett signed a one-year deal as a free agent with the New York Rangers on July 10, 2012. He was assigned for the duration of his contract to AHL affiliate, the Connecticut Whale, for the 2012–13 season.

After two seasons in the Kontinental Hockey League with stints between Vityaz Podolsk, Admiral Vladivostok and Severstal Cherepovets, Pyett returned to North America, securing a one-year AHL contract with the Lehigh Valley Phantoms on August 21, 2015.

Before beginning the 2015–16 season, Pyett was diagnosed with Sarcoma in his upper leg. He was unable to appear in a game with the Phantoms and after two years off recovering, returned to the professional circuit in agreeing to a one-year contract with Japanese club, Tohoku Free Blades of the Asia League Ice Hockey.

In making a successful return from cancer with the Free Blades, Pyett returned to the AHL for the 2018–19 season, agreeing to terms on a one-year contract with the Hershey Bears, affiliate to the Washington Capitals, on August 17, 2018. Through three months into the season, Pyett featured in just 10 games with the Bears before opting to conclude his tenure in Hershey in order to again pursue a contract abroad on December 7, 2018. Pyett quickly pursued an offer abroad, agreeing to a contract for the remainder of the season in Finland, with KooKoo of the Liiga, on December 10, 2018.

== Career statistics ==
=== Regular season and playoffs ===
			Regular season					Playoffs
Season	Team	League	GP	G	A	Pts	PIM	GP	G	A	Pts	PIM
2003–04	Regina Pats	WHL	2	0	1	1	0	3	0	0	0	0
2004–05	Regina Pats	WHL	67	5	19	24	67	—	—	—	—	—
2005–06	Regina Pats	WHL	71	10	35	45	89	6	1	6	7	12
2006–07	Regina Pats	WHL	71	14	48	62	84	10	3	6	9	4
2007–08	Regina Pats	WHL	62	20	34	54	54	6	1	3	4	0
2008–09	Grand Rapids Griffins	AHL	61	3	11	14	12	1	0	0	0	0
2009–10	Grand Rapids Griffins	AHL	80	9	21	30	41	—	—	—	—	—
2010–11	Grand Rapids Griffins	AHL	74	9	13	22	38	—	—	—	—	—
2011–12	Grand Rapids Griffins	AHL	73	2	25	27	54	—	—	—	—	—
2012–13	Connecticut Whale	AHL	74	7	32	39	35	—	—	—	—	—
2013–14	Vityaz Podolsk	KHL	33	5	6	11	10	—	—	—	—	—
2013–14	Admiral Vladivostok	KHL	17	1	4	5	4	5	0	2	2	6
2014–15	Admiral Vladivostok	KHL	21	4	3	7	14	—	—	—	—	—
2014–15	Severstal Cherepovets	KHL	32	1	7	8	14	—	—	—	—	—
2017–18	Tohoku Free Blades	ALH	26	4	11	15	49	4	1	1	2	12
2018–19	Hershey Bears	AHL	10	0	1	1	8	—	—	—	—	—
2018–19	KooKoo	Liiga	21	0	1	1	12	—	—	—	—	—
2019–20	Frederikshavn White Hawks	DEN	12	0	2	2	14	—	—	—	—	—
2019–20	HSC Csíkszereda	EL	14	7	6	13	18	6	0	1	1	25
2019–20	HSC Csíkszereda	ROU	8	1	2	3	5	—	—	—	—	—
2020–21	Outlook Ice Hawks	SVHL	3	1	2	3	0	—	—	—	—	—
2021–22	Outlook Ice Hawks	SVHL	13	4	6	10	12	8	3	7	10	12
AHL totals			372	30	103	133	188	1	0	0	0	0
KHL totals			103	11	20	31	42	5	0	2	2	6

=== International ===
Medal record

Representing Canada

Ice hockey

World Junior Championships
Gold medal – first place	2008 Pardubice	

Year	Team	Event	Result	GP	G	A	Pts	PIM
2005	Canada Western	U17	1st place, gold medalist(s)	6	2	4	6	8
2005	Canada	U18	1st place, gold medalist(s)	5	2	0	2	4
2006	Canada	WJC18	4th	7	1	3	4	10
2008	Canada	WJC	1st place, gold medalist(s)	7	0	1	1	4
Junior totals				25	5	8	13	26

== Awards and honours ==
Award	Year
WHL
East First All-Star Team	2008
