= Roland Groome =

Canadian aviator

Roland John Groome
- Born: 10 July 1897; Kettering, Northamptonshire, United Kingdom
- Died: 20 September 1935 (aged 38); Regina, Saskatchewan, Canada
- Occupation: aviator

Roland John Groome (10 July 1897 in Kettering, Northamptonshire, United Kingdom – 20 September 1935) was a Canadian aviator from Regina, Saskatchewan, Canada.

Groome, who had served with the Royal Flying Corps as an instructor during World War I set up the "Aerial Service Co" in 1919, with his partner Edward Clarke. Although the company was a failure Groome had registered Canada's first aircraft, C-GAAA, a Curtis JN4 biplane and in April 1920 he became the first licensed commercial pilot in Canada.

Because the forerunner of Transport Canada made their first trip from Ottawa, Ontario in 1920 to Regina, Groome was able to claim several aviation firsts in Canada. He received the first pilot's licence, the first commercial pilot's licence and the airfield he had helped set up was licensed as Canada's first "air harbour". At the same time his mechanic Robert McCombie was given Canada's first air engineer's license.

In 1927 Groome set up his second company "Universal Air Industries" at a new airfield called "Lakeview Aerodrome". Later that same year he also helped form the "Regina Flying Club", where he was to hold the position of flying instructor until his death.

In September 1935, Groome and student Arnold Sym were killed when the control rod on the aileron of their Avro Avian failed and the aircraft crashed just outside Regina.

== External links and references ==
- CAHS Regina
- Saskatoon Centennial
- Regina Library
- Regina - The Early Years (includes photo of the first aerodrome)
- Saskatchewan Aviation Council (PDF, includes photo of C-GAAA)
