= Ethel McCreary =

Canadian baseball player

- Outfield / First base
- Born: Regina, Saskatchewan, Canada
- Died: January 5, 1985; Winnipeg, Manitoba, Canada

Teams
- Kenosha Comets (1943)

Ethel Genevere McCreary Gould (died January 5, 1985) was a Canadian infielder/outfielder who played in the All-American Girls Professional Baseball League (AAGPBL). She batted and threw right handed.

Born in Regina, Saskatchewan, Ethel McCreary was one of the 68 players born in Canada to join the All-American Girls Professional Baseball League in its twelve-year history. She was also one of the original Kenosha Comets league's founding members in its 1943 inaugural season.

McCreary served primarily as a backup outfielder and played some games at first base. She posted a slash line (BA/OBP/SLG) of .251/.305/.299 in her only season, a pretty good performance considering it was a dominant pitching circuit and no batters surpassed a .300 average on the year.

McCreary gained honorary induction into the Canadian Baseball Hall of Fame in 1998. She received further recognition in 1988 when she became part of Women in Baseball, a permanent display based at the Baseball Hall of Fame and Museum in Cooperstown, New York, which was unveiled to honor the entire All-American Girls Professional Baseball League.

== Batting statistics ==
GP	AB	R	H	2B	3B	HR	RBI	SB	TB	BB	SO	BA	OBP	SLG
71	231	29	58	6	1	1	36	11	69	18	7	.251	.305	.299
