= Martha Rommelaere =

Canadian baseball player

- Born: August 30, 1922; Deloraine, Manitoba, Canada
- Died: May 28, 2011 (aged 88); Regina, Saskatchewan, Canada
- Batted: Right Threw: Right

Teams
- Chicago Colleens/Springfield Sallies (1950); Kenosha Comets (1950)

Career highlights and awards
- Canadian Baseball Hall of Fame (1998)

Martha Rommelaere [Manning] (August 30, 1922 – May 28, 2011) was a Canadian outfielder who played in the All-American Girls Professional Baseball League (AAGPBL) during the 1950 season. Listed at 5'4", 120 lb., she batted and threw right handed.

Born in Deloraine, Manitoba, Martha Rommelaere was one of the 57 players born in Canada to join the All-American Girls Professional Baseball League in its twelve years history. However, her career in the circuit was cut short due to a severe back injury.

Rommelaere grew up on a farm near LaFleche, and moved to Moose Jaw, Saskatchewan at seventeen. She began to play sandlot ball with the boys of her neighborhood when she was a little girl, and became a track and field star in high school who could outrun any girl in Saskatchewan. I could run like a deer, she explained in an interview.

== Softball ==
At age 22, Rommelaere joined the Moose Jaw Royals softball team. She was missed by scouts of the All-American Girls Professional Baseball League during her first years in softball. Then she gained the Most Valuable Player award while playing for the Edmonton team, where she won a trip to South Bend, Indiana to try out for the league.

== Baseball ==
Rommelaere entered the league in 1950, playing for the Chicago Colleens and Springfield Sallies traveling teams before being promoted to the Kenosha Comets halfway through the season. Basically an infielder in Canada, she was converted to the outfield because of her flashy speed. She hurt her back while playing and had problem with it during her AAGPBL career. It was the sitting on the bus that killed me, she said.

== After baseball ==
At the end of the season, she married John Manning and decided to quit baseball because of her back ailment, which required five surgeries to correct the problem. The couple raised three children, and she worked as a dressmaker until her retirement in 1983.

Martha Rommelaere Manning was a longtime resident of Regina, Saskatchewan, where she died, aged 88.

== Recognition ==
In 1998, she gained honorary induction into the Canadian Baseball Hall of Fame. In addition, she received a Certificate of Merit from the Government of Canada for her contribution to sports and fitness. She is part of the AAGPBL permanent display at the Baseball Hall of Fame and Museum at Cooperstown, New York, opened in 1988, which is dedicated to the entire league rather than any individual personality.

Batting statistics

GP	AB	R	H	2B	3B	HR	RBI	SB	BB	SO	BA	OBP
30	80	7	15	0	0	0	7	8	10	12	.188	.278
