= Regina Five =

Regina Five is the name given to five abstract painters, Kenneth Lochhead, Arthur McKay, Douglas Morton, Ted Godwin, and Ronald Bloore, who displayed their works in the 1961 National Gallery of Canada's exhibition "Five Painters from Regina".

With painter Roy Kiyooka and architect Clifford Wiens, this group shared a common professional commitment and became a small but active artistic community in Regina. Having studied in central Canada, the United States, and Europe, before moving to Regina, the Regina Five combined the major currents of abstract expressionism in the context of 1950s Saskatchewan.

In 1958, Ronald Bloore, then the director of the Norman Mackenzie Art Gallery (now MacKenzie Art Gallery) in Regina, Saskatchewan, brought national and international exhibitions to Regina. These exhibitions underscored the originality of the Regina Five's work. The Regina Five's bold, nonfigurative paintings represented a new direction in abstract painting in western Canada and reflected influx of advanced ideas arriving through the channel of the annual Emma Lake Artists' Workshops, especially the workshop held by Barnett Newman in 1959.

The painters came to national attention when Bloore organized "The May Show" (1960), featuring five of the city`s most prominent abstract artists and architectural drawings and models by architect Clifford Wiens along with sculptures by Wolfram Niessen, to coincide with the meeting of the Canadian Museums Association. The exhibition inspired Richard B. Simmins, Coordinator of Extension Services at the National Gallery of Canada, to select work of the five painters for a travelling exhibition titled Five Painters from Regina that appeared in 1961 in Ottawa.

Simmins` essay in the Five Painters from Regina catalogue stressed the importance of Emma Lake Workshops run by the New York school and of Ron Bloore who acted as a catalyst. Simmins wrote that Bloore, who was from Toronto, brought to Regina a set of values which challenged the other painters.
