= Doug Morton (artist) =

Canadian artist (1926–2004)

- Born: Douglas Gibb Morton; 26 November 1926; Winnipeg, Manitoba
- Died: 4 January 2004 (aged 77); Victoria, BC
- Education: Winnipeg School of Art (1946); University of Southern California, Los Angeles (1947–1948), the Académie Julian; École des Beaux-Arts; Studio André Lhote, Paris (1949), the Camberwell School of Art and Studio of Martin Bloch in London (1950–1951); Emma Lake Artists' Workshops (1957–1965).
- Known for: artist, administrator, educator, curator

Douglas Morton RCA L.L. D. (26 November 1926 – 4 January 2004) was a Canadian artist and member of the Regina Five, having also participated in the Emma Lake workshops.

== Career ==
Morton was born in Winnipeg and after a short stint in the Canadian Army went to the Winnipeg School of Art (1946); the University of Southern California, Los Angeles (1947–1948), the Académie Julian; École des Beaux-Arts; Studio André Lhote, Paris (1949), the Camberwell School of Art and Studio of Martin Bloch in London, England (1950–1951); and also with the Emma Lake Artists' Workshops (1957–1965) with artists and critics such as Will Barnett (1967), Barnett Newman (1959), John Ferren (1960), Herman Cherry (1961), Clement Greenberg (1962), Kenneth Noland (1963), and Lawrence Alloway (1985).

After working as a commercial artist in 1946, Morton became curator of the Calgary Allied Arts Centre (1951–1953), then was vice-president and manager of MacKay-Morton Ltd in Regina (1954–1967), his family business, an industrial pipe distributor.

In 1961, his work was included in a National Gallery of Canada exhibition entitled Five Painters from Regina. The group became known as the Regina Five.

In 1967, he was invited to join the University of Saskatchewan, Regina Campus as director of Visual Arts and Associate Professor of Art. From 1968 to 1980, he taught at York University, Toronto (1968–1980) where he served as Associate Dean. Afterwards, Morton became Dean of the Faculty of Fine Arts of the University of Victoria until 1985 when he retired from administration as "professor emeritus" but from 1985 to 1987, he went on to serve as president at the Alberta College of Art.

A retrospective of Morton's work was organized by the Art Gallery of Greater Victoria in 1994. His fonds is in the University of Regina Library Archives and Special Collections.

== Work ==
Morton uses biomorphic shapes in his paintings. His colleague, Ron Bloore, said of his work:

Morton's bold imagery is difficult to place within a Canadian visual art milieu because his roots seem to be in the apparently contradictory sources of pre-war French Purism and German Expressionism...Morton's vision is non-representational. It is also monumental and powerful; these are not characteristics normally associated with art of his generation in Canada.

He's one of the most erotic, sensuous and underestimated painters in the country. I suspect that may be one of the reasons why people don't want to confront him.

== Honours and memberships ==
- Honorary Doctor of Laws, University of Regina with the other members of the Regina Five (2001)
- Member, Royal Canadian Academy of Arts

== Selected public collections ==
- MacKenzie Art Gallery, Regina
- Mendel Art Gallery (Remai Modern), Saskatoon
- National Gallery of Canada, Ottawa
- Saskatchewan Arts Board
- Art Gallery of Greater Victoria
