= Arthur McKay =

Painter

- Born: September 11, 1926; Nipawin, Saskatchewan, Canada
- Died: August 3, 2000 (aged 73); Squamish, British Columbia, Canada
- Occupations: painter, educator
- Awards: Humanities Research Council grant through the Canada Foundation, 1956–1957; Canada Council Senior Fellowship, 1963–1964

Arthur Fortescue McKay, best known as Art McKay L.L. D. (September 11, 1926 – August 3, 2000) was a painter and a member of the Regina Five. Most of his work is abstract.

== Early life and education ==
McKay was born in Nipawin, Saskatchewan. His father was Joseph Fortescue McKay, a son of Angus McKay whose own grandfather was the younger John Richards McKay and whose grandmother was Harriet Ballenden. This and other ancestry would qualify McKay as an Anglo-Métis artist in Saskatchewan and in Canada. His mother, Georgina Agnes Newnham, was a daughter of another historical figure in Saskatchewan, the Anglican Bishop of Saskatchewan, Jervois Newnham.

From an early age, McKay drew landscape. His training in art began at the Provincial Institute of Technology and Art (now the Alberta University of the Arts) in Calgary (1946–1948), and later at the Académie de la Grande Chaumière in Paris (1949–1950), Columbia University in New York (1956–1957), and The Barnes Foundation in Merion, Pennsylvania (1956–1957).

== Career ==
In 1952, McKay joined the staff of the Regina Art School (today University of Regina). From 1951 to 1956, he was a lecturer in art at the University of Saskatchewan. While there, McKay helped organize a series of Emma Lake Artists' Workshops in rural Saskatchewan. He became an associate professor in art there between 1956 and 1974, and director from 1964 to 1967. In 1978, he was an associate professor of art at the University of Regina.

McKay received national and international attention as one of the painting group the Regina Five. The group's paintings were exhibited at the National Gallery of Canada in 1961 in a show titled "Five Painters from Regina". He was influenced in the 1960s by Barnett Newman, whom he, Ron Bloore, and Roy Kiyooka invited to the Emma Lake Artists' Workshop as guest artist in 1959.

McKay's best known works are his scraped enamel circular and rectangular "mandalas", in which he uses relaxing, contemplative imagery to depict ideas related to Zen Buddhism. McKay was included in Clement Greenberg's 1964 "Post-Painterly Abstraction" exhibition. In the 1970s, he continued to paint abstractions but also reintroduced the landscape in his work.

In 1997, the MacKenzie Art Gallery mounted a national travelling exhibition, "Arthur F. McKay: A Critical Retrospective". At the exhibition opening, McKay said: "If I had known I was that good, I would have painted more."

His work is in many collections, both public and private, such as the National Gallery of Canada, Ottawa and Art Gallery of Guelph.

McKay died on August 3, 2000, in Squamish, British Columbia, at the age of 73.

== Honours and memberships ==
- Honorary Doctor of Laws, University of Regina with the other members of the Regina Five (2001);
