= Joe Fafard =

Canadian sculptor (1942–2019)

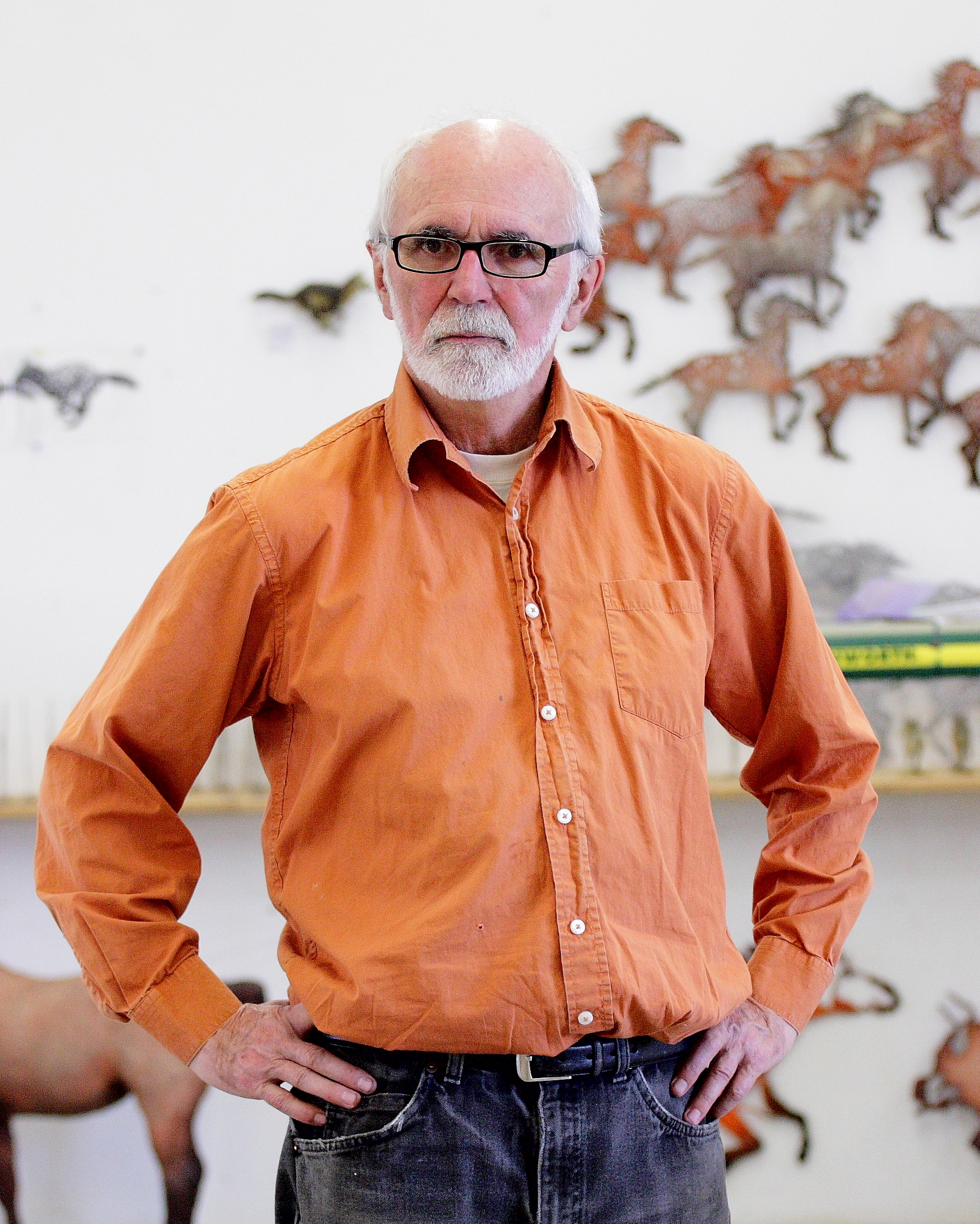
- Fafard in his studio in 2008
- Born: September 2, 1942; Ste. Marthe Rocanville, Saskatchewan, Canada
- Died: March 16, 2019 (aged 76); Lumsden, Saskatchewan, Canada
- Education: University of Manitoba; Pennsylvania State University
- Known for: Sculptor
- Awards: Order of Canada; Saskatchewan Order of Merit
- Website: www.joefafard.com

Joseph Hector Yvon Fafard CM SOM (September 2, 1942 – March 16, 2019) was a Canadian sculptor.

== Biography ==
Joseph Fafard was a twelfth generation Canadian born in 1942 in Ste. Marthe, Saskatchewan, to French Canadians Leopold Fafard and Julienne Cantin. Fafard is a descendant of Jacques Goulet. He received a B.F.A from the University of Manitoba in 1966 and a M.F.A. from Pennsylvania State University in 1968. From 1968 to 1974, he taught sculpture at the University of Saskatchewan, Regina Campus (now the University of Regina). He was a visiting lecturer at the University of California, Davis in 1980–1981. He received several awards throughout his professional career including being named an Officer of the Order of Canada in 1981, the Architectural Institute of Canada Allied Arts Award in 1987, the Saskatchewan Order of Merit in 2002, the National Prix Montfort in 2003, and the Lieutenant Governor's Saskatchewan Centennial Medal for the Arts in 2005. He also received Honorary Doctorate Degrees from the University of Regina (1989) and University of Manitoba (2007).

Fafard met Ric Gomez and David Gilhooly in 1968 when he arrived at the Regina School of Art to teach pottery and sculpture. They introduced him to Funk art and under their influence, he began making figures in clay. Throughout his career, Fafard sculpted with plaster, clay, and bronze, which was his primary medium in the 1980s. His work was heavily influenced by his Saskatchewan surroundings, and ranged in size from handheld to larger than life-sized. He worked closely with choreographer Jean Pierre Perrault to place his cow sculptures as set designs for several of Perrault's environmental dance pieces. In 1985, he opened the Julienne Atelier foundry in Pense, Saskatchewan, where he was based for the majority of his working years. At the foundry, he worked in series, producing portraits of well-known artists and politicians, including bronzes of Canadian prime ministers Pierre Elliott Trudeau, and John G. Diefenbaker.

Fafard's works have been shown in Canada and abroad in countries including the United States, Great Britain, France and Japan. In 2007, Terrence Heath curated the retrospective exhibition Joe Fafard for the National Gallery of Canada and MacKenzie Art Gallery in Regina. His art was featured on a series of postage stamps issued by Canada Post in 2012. The National Gallery of Canada in Ottawa installed his colourful Running Horses (2007) in 2011 adjacent to the Sussex Drive entrance. He died at his home outside of Lumsden, Saskatchewan on March 16, 2019, from stomach cancer at the age of 76.

Fafard's work has been an inspiration to many Western artists such as David Garneau.

== Personal life ==
In 1967, Joe married Susan Wiebe, a major in ceramics also at the Winnipeg School of Art. [Source: “Joe Fafard”, Terrence Heath, Vancouver: Douglas & McIntyre, 2007, p. 46] Their son, Joёl, was born on November 18, 1968. Their first daughter, Misha, was born on March 23, 1970; and a second daughter, Gina, was born on December 10, 1972. “By the end of the 1980s Joe and Susan’s marriage had become strained. They began to live more and more separate lives.” [op cit, p. 162] Fafard divorced Susan in 1991. During this period of professional and personal turmoil in Fafard's life, he met Alyce Hamon, who came from a large French-Canadian family in Gravelbourg, Saskatchewan, who worked in French theatre in Saskatoon. [op cit, p. 166] Joe's third daughter, Solenne, was born to Alyce Hamon on May 29, 1994. Joe's second son, Julien, was born to Alyce on June 11, 1998. Alyce Hamon and Joe were married on August 6, 2000. [op cit, p. 208-9]

== Public works ==
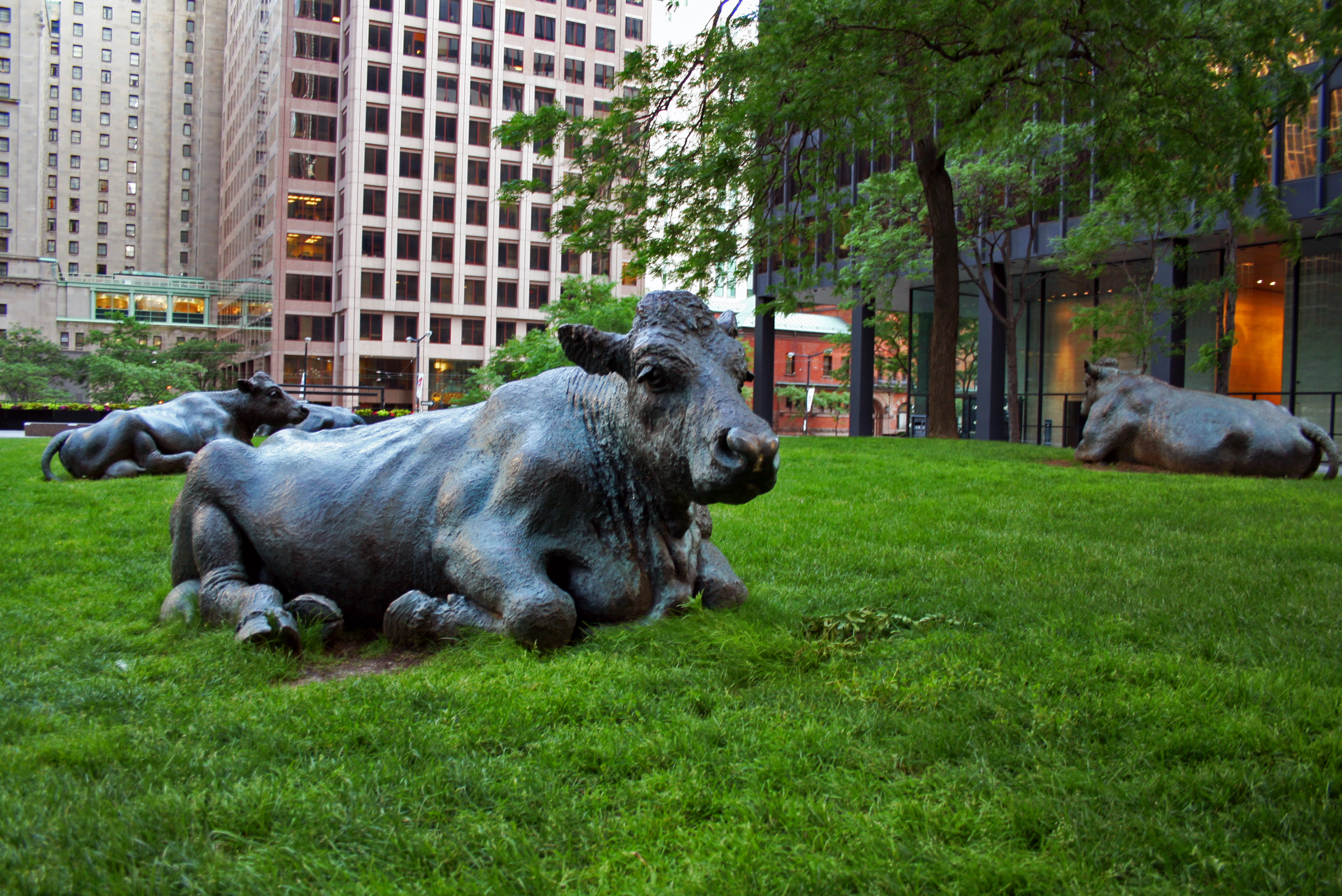
"The Pasture" (1985), Toronto Dominion Centre, Toronto, Ontario Canada

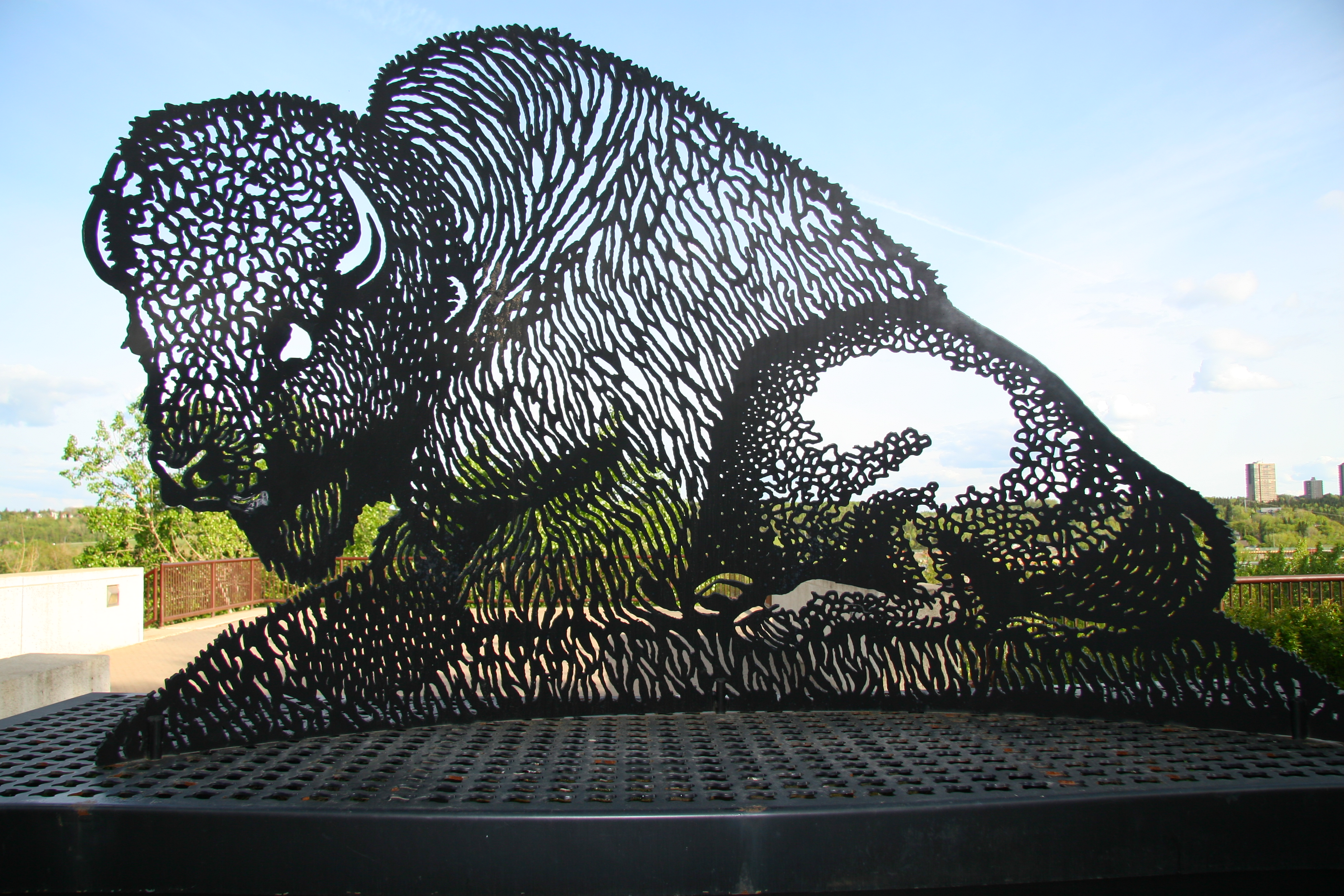
Paskwamostos, outside of Shaw Conference Centre, Edmonton, Alberta

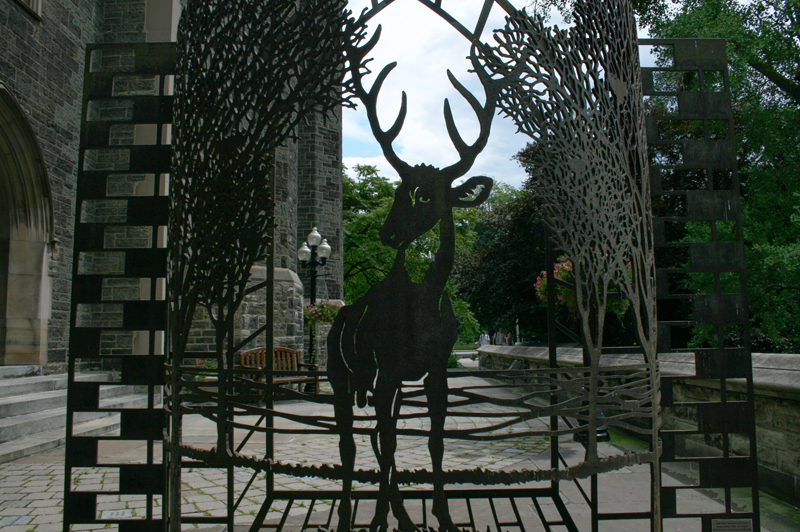
Nurture Nature (1993), east side of Hart House, Toronto, Ontario Canada

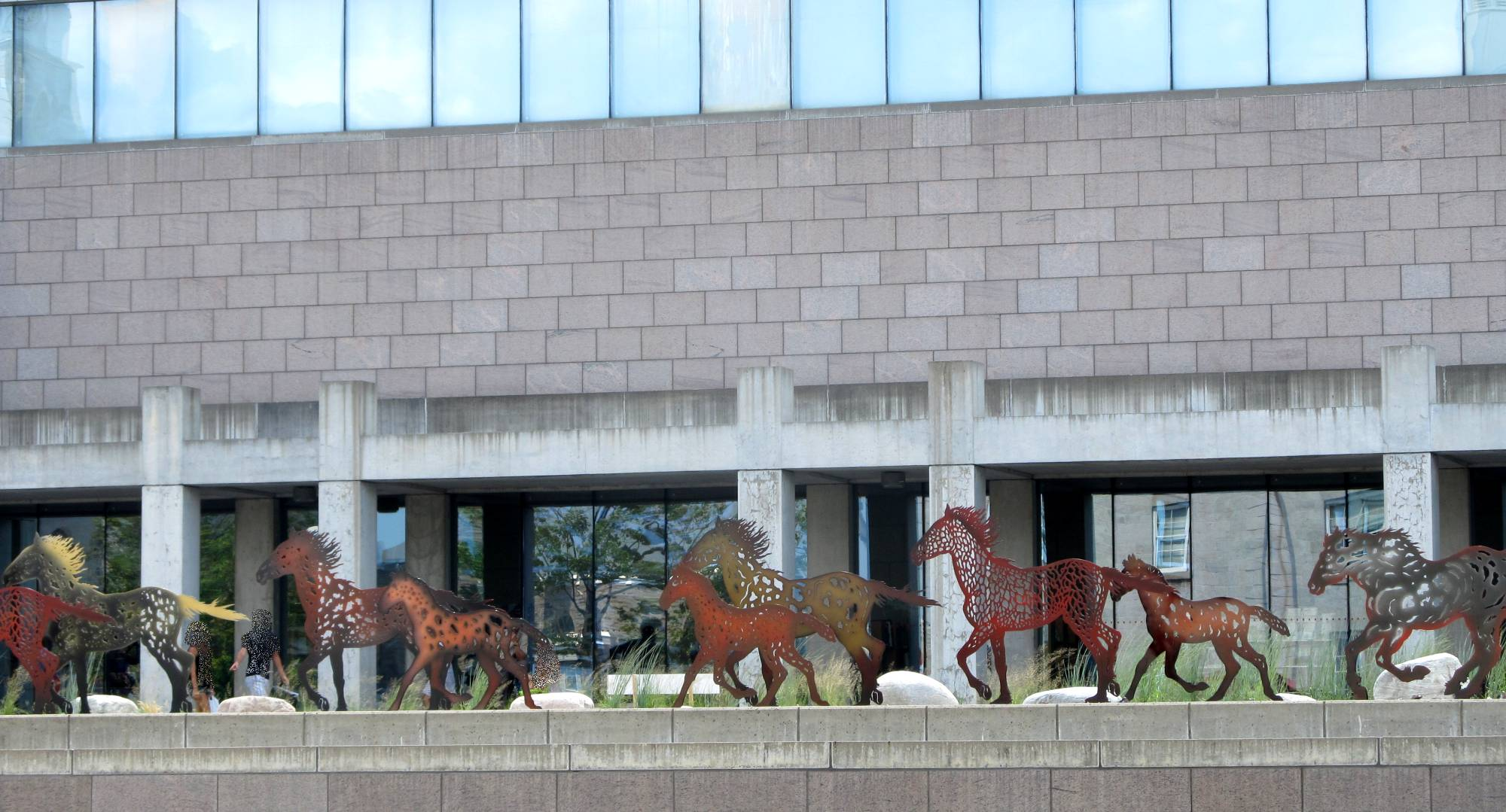
Running Horses at the National Gallery of Canada Ottawa, Ontario Canada
- Oskana-Ka-Ashteki (Cree for Bones that are piled together), 800 block of Scarth Street in downtown Regina, Saskatchewan (1998)
- Claudia, along avenue de Musée entrance of Michal and Renata Hornstein Pavilion, Montreal Museum of Fine Arts (2003)

== Awards ==
- Officer of the Order of Canada, 1981
- Medal in Allied Arts, Royal Architectural Institute of Canada, 1987
- Honorary Doctorate Degree, University of Regina, 1989
- Saskatchewan Order of Merit, 2002
- National Prix Montfort, 2003
- Lieutenant Governor's Saskatchewan Centennial Medal for the Arts, 2005
- CTV Citizen of the Year in 2006
- Honorary Doctorate Degree, University of Manitoba, 2007
- Saskatchewan Arts Board Lifetime Achievement Award, 2007
