= SK Arts =

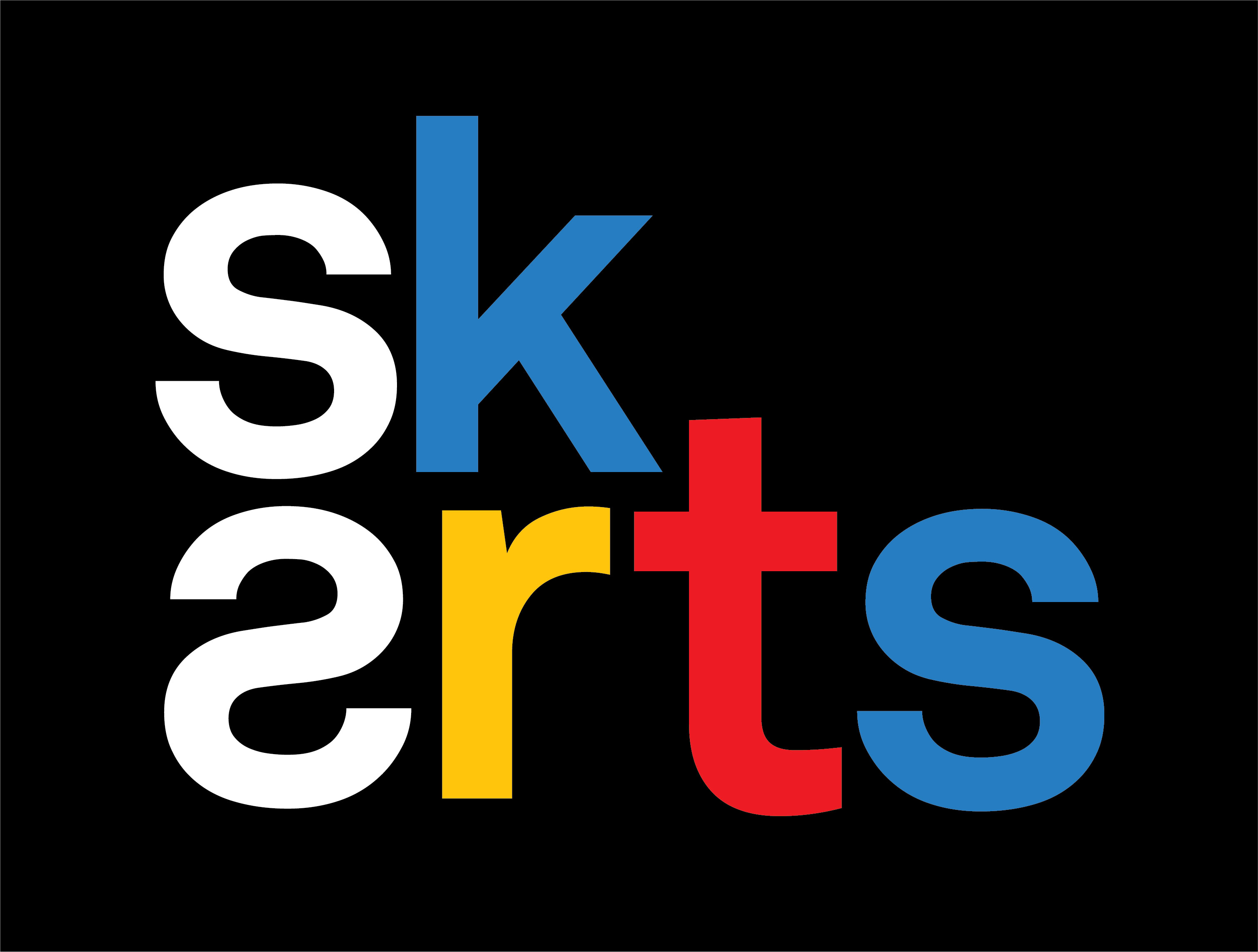

The Saskatchewan Arts Board is an arm's-length funding agency that provides support to artists, arts organizations and communities. Established in 1948, it was the first agency of its kind in Canada, predating the Canada Council for the Arts by nine years. The Arts Board has offices in Regina and Saskatoon. In May 2020, the agency changed its operation name to SK Arts.

The Arts Board is governed by The Arts Board Act, 1997, and funded by the Government of Saskatchewan through the Ministry of Parks, Culture and Sport. The Arts Board receives additional support from the Saskatchewan Lotteries Trust Fund for Sport, Culture and Recreation as a result of the Arts Board's partnership with SaskCulture Inc.

Although officially appointed by the Lieutenant Governor-in-Council, one-third of the members of the Arts Board's board of directors is chosen from a list of nominees provided by the arts community. This process assists in ensuring the Arts Board is representative of the thoughts, ideas and directions of the community itself. The board reports to the province's minister responsible for the Saskatchewan Arts Board.

== History ==
The Saskatchewan Arts Board was established in 1948 by the Order-in-Council, created out of a larger plan from the government to enable cultural growth in the area. They initially ran arts programs, such as outreach programs and tours.

== Funding and Programs ==
The Arts Board offers several funding opportunities and programs for individuals and organizations, including:

- Accessibility Fund
- Artists in Communities Program
- Artists in Schools Program
- Building Arts Equity: BPOC Program
- Independent Artists Program
- Indigenous Peoples Art and Artists Program
- Micro-Grant Program
- Prince Edward Arts Scholarship
- Professional Arts Organizations Program
- SaskFestivals
- Share and Connect: Indigenous Community Arts Program

The Arts Board also administers grant and award programs in partnership with other agencies, such as the Access Copyright Foundation and the Saskatchewan Foundation for the Arts.

== Permanent Collection ==
The Arts Board's Permanent Collection is a collection of art by Saskatchewan artists. It includes approximately 3,000 works of art in all media by 750 artists and is the largest body of work by Saskatchewan artists in the world.

The Arts Board makes the Permanent Collection accessible by bringing it to workplaces, schools and communities. Works form the collection are loaned to galleries and other venues around the province and country for exhibitions, film production, broadcast and publication opportunities. The Arts Board's Art Rental program brings artwork into the office. Art Rental clients are Saskatchewan government departments, agencies, crown corporations, boards, commissions and the corporate sector. Non-profit organizations and institutions may also rent art from the Collection.

== Saskatchewan Arts Awards ==
In 1988, the Arts Board established the Lifetime Award for Excellence in the Arts. The award honours Saskatchewan individuals whose accomplishments have had a major impact on the arts provincially, nationally and internationally.

In 2004, the awards program expanded and the Arts Board established the Lieutenant Governor's Arts Awards to recognize the achievements made by individuals, groups and organizations in the arts.

In 2016, it was renamed the Saskatchewan Arts Awards. In addition to the award, all recipients receive a cash prize. Award categories include Lieutenant Governor's Lifetime Achievement, Emerging Artist, Leadership - Individual, Leadership - Organization, Arts and Learning, and Artistic Excellence.

The Saskatchewan Arts Awards was discontinued in 2023.

== Partnerships ==
- Legislative Building 100th Anniversary Artist Residency

The Legislative Building Artist in Residence Program was part of the province's year-long celebration in 2012 of the 100th anniversary of the Saskatchewan Legislative Building. It was developed in partnership with the Arts Board. The eight participants explored the history and significance of the building through their own artistic disciplines.

Each artist hosted a community engaged project to encourage cultural exchange at the building and created a work of art that is displayed in one of the alcoves in the Rotunda. The artwork was unveiled in December 2012.

- Artists in the Community

The Artists in the Community project ran from October 2006 to September 2007. It was presented by the Arts Board in collaboration with the City of Saskatoon, with the financial support of the Government of Canada through the Cultural Capitals of Canada program of the Department of Canadian Heritage.

Eight community-based residencies were selected from a broad variety of sectors within Saskatoon. Organizational staff, volunteers, community members, managers, and organization clientele had the unique opportunity to work with an artist for six to nine months.

- Art at Work

In 2004, the Art At Work project was presented by the Arts Board, in collaboration with the City of Regina, with the financial support of the Cultural Capitals of Canada program.

== 100 Years of Heart: Celebrating Saskatchewan's Centennial ==
The Arts Board was involved in celebrating Saskatchewan's Centennial in 2005 with two important projects:

- Centennial Commissions Project: To celebrate the Saskatchewan Centennial, the Arts Board commissioned the design, creation, and installation of four large-scale, permanent, outdoor artworks in four Saskatchewan communities: Estevan (Spinning Prairie by Jefferson Little); Lloydminster (Sky Dance by Douglas Bentham); Yorkton (Doorways to Opportunity by Lionel Peyachew) and LaRonge (Portage by Chris St. Amand).
- Saskatchewan Centennial Mural Project: The Province of Saskatchewan designated funding for the creation of a large mural in the Saskatchewan Legislative Building. The painting was installed in the building rotunda. Roger Jerome, a Métis artist from Air Ronge, designed and painted the mural, Northern Tradition and Transition.

== Executive Secretaries/Executive Directors/Chief Executive Officers ==
1948-1956 – Norah McCullough

1956-1957 – Norah McCullough (on leave); Blowden Davies (acting)

1958 – Florence James (acting); Donald Harvey

1959-1960 – Donald Harvey

1961-1968 – N. George Shaw

1968-1971 – Cal D. Abrahamson

1972-1976 – Vern Bell

1977-1982/83 – Joy Cohnstaedt

1983/84-1984/85 – Kathleen Kaple

1985/86-1990/91 – Wayne Cunningham

1990/91 – Hans Boers (acting)

1991/92-1997/98 – Valerie Creighton

1998/99-2009/10 – Jeremy Morgan

2010/11-2013/14 – David Kyle

2014/15 – Jeremy Morgan (interim); Ranjan Thakre (interim)

2015/16 - 2024/25 – Michael Jones

2024/25 - present – Lisa Bird-Wilson

== Board Chairs ==
1948-49 – Steward Basterfield

1950-64 – W.A. Riddell

1965-67 – D.M. McPherson

1968-69 – R. Usher

1970-71 – J.H. Gould

1972-74 – James Weir

1975-77 – Paul J. Rezansoff

1978/79-1979/80 – Raymond J. Marcotte

1980/81 – Frances Morrison

1981/82-1982/83 – Patrick Adams

1983/84-1989/90 – Barbara Pollock

1989/90 – Betty Barootes (acting)

1990/91 – Sharon Maher

1991/92 – Paul Good

1992/93-1993/94 – Wayne Schmalz

1994/95-1997/98 – Cheryl Kloppenburg

1998/99 – Frank Proto

1999/2000-2005/06 – Colleen Bailey

2006/07-2007/08 – Ken Sagal

2008/09-2012/13 – Byrna Barclay

2013/14-2016/17 – Pamella Acton

2017/18 – Pamella Acton; Meghan McCreary; Rachel Heidecker (acting)

2018/19 - 2020/21 – Jason Aebig

2021/22 - 2024/24 - Cory Furman

2024/25 - present - Ian Rea

== Bibliography ==
- Riddell, W.A. 1979. Cornerstone For Culture: A History of the Saskatchewan Arts Board from 1948 to 1978. Regina: Saskatchewan Arts Board.
