= MacKenzie Art Gallery =

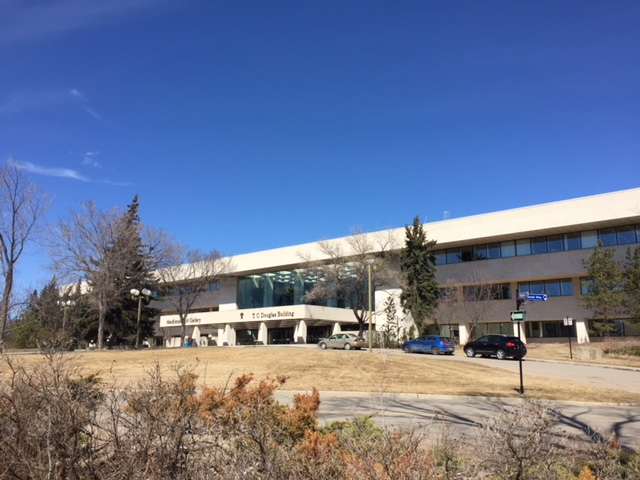
- Exterior facade of the MacKenzie Art Gallery
- Former name: Norman Mackenzie Art Gallery
- Established: 1953; 73 years ago
- Location: 3475 Albert Street, Regina, Saskatchewan, Canada
- Coordinates: 50°25′30″N 104°37′0″W
- Type: Art museum
- Executive director: John G. Hampton
- Curator: Timothy Long
- Website: mackenzie.art

The MacKenzie Art Gallery (MAG; French: Musee d’art MacKenzie) is an art museum located in Regina, Saskatchewan, Canada. The museum occupies the multipurpose T. C. Douglas Building, situated at the edge of the Wascana Centre. The building holds eight galleries totaling 2,200 square metres (24,000 sq ft) of exhibition space.

The museum originates from a private collection donated to Regina College (later the University of Regina) by Norman MacKenzie. In 1953, the college established the Norman MacKenzie Art Gallery in order to exhibit works from that collection. In 1990, the art museum was incorporated as an independent institution from the university, and moved into the T. C. Douglas Building at the southwestern edge of Wascana Centre.

The MacKenzie Art Gallery's permanent collection has over 5,000 works spanning over 5,000 years of Canadian history. In addition to exhibiting works from its collection, the museum has also organized, and hosted a number of travelling arts exhibitions.

== History ==
The art museum originates from the collections of Norman MacKenzie, who bequeathed his collection to the Regina College (later the University of Regina) in 1936. The college established an art museum to exhibit MacKenzie's collection in 1953, known as the Norman MacKenzie Art Gallery. The establishment of a museum that year makes the Mackenzie Art Gallery the oldest public art museum in the province of Saskatchewan.

In 1990, the museum was incorporated as an institution independent of the University of Regina, although maintains partnerships with the university. In the same year, the museum moved to its present building. The museum continues to act as custodians for the art collection owned by the University of Regina, although those works are owned by the university, with the museum maintaining its own permanent collection, originated from the Norman MacKenzie collection.

In 1998, the MacKenzie Art Gallery became the first public art museum in Canada to appoint an indigenous Canadian as its head curator.

In August 2018, the museum received its largest donation in its history, a C$25 million anonymous donation. The donation was endowed to the South Saskatchewan Community Foundation, which helps to manage and disperse the funds on the museum's behalf. The museum has set the fund aside to help support the museum's annual budgets, programs, as well as fund the construction of a cafe, and event space.

The museum underwent several changes in 2019, including the launch of a re-branding campaign in May, unveiling a new logo for the institution. The museum also announced its commitment towards increasing its support for Indigenous Canadian artists, as well as expanding its usage of the French language, one of the country's two official languages. In June, the museum began charging adult visitors admission to access the second floor galleries of the museum, although other parts of the museum grounds remained free for visitors. However, shortly after announcing the introduction of admission fees, the museum announced it would offer free admission to the second floor gallery 12 days each year, over the next five years. The free admission program was funded through a C$1 million private donation to the museum.

In 2019, a sculpture holding a bowl of rice, thought to represent Vishnu, was identified by Winnipeg-based artist Divya Mehra was potentially stolen from an active temple in 1913. Siddhartha Shah of the Peabody Essex Museum later confirmed her findings, and that the sculpture actually depicted Annapurna. In 2021, the Annapurna sculpture was repatriated to Government of Uttar Pradesh. The sculpture was ceremonially installed at the Kashi Vishwanath Temple on 15 November 2021.

== Architecture ==
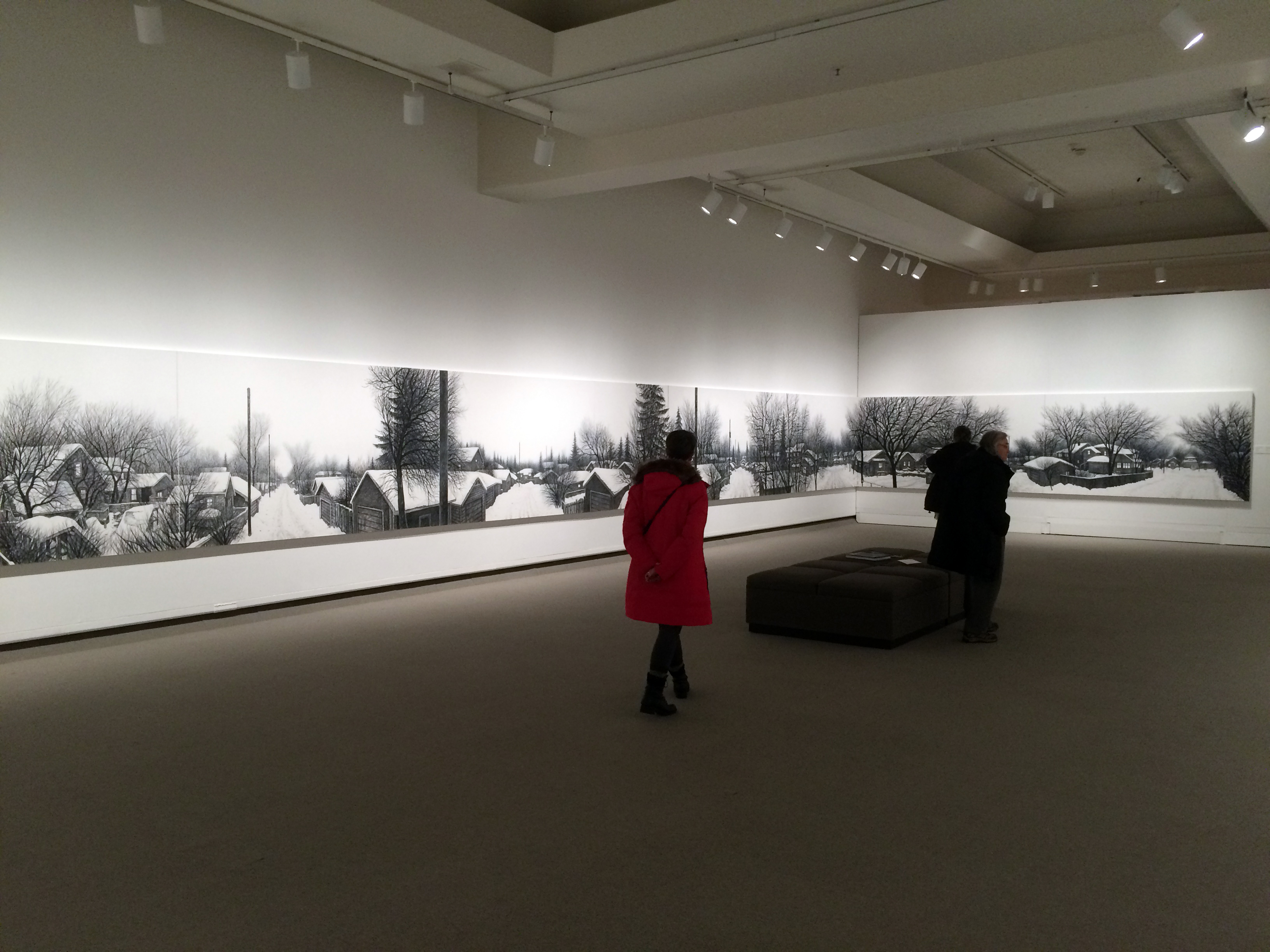
Murals on exhibit inside the T. C. Douglas Building

The museum property is situated at the southwestern edge of Wascana Centre, an urban park centred around an artificial lake, and Wascana Creek. The museum's building is a multipurpose space, with parts of the building space dedicated to museum use, whereas other parts are used as office space for several provincial departments and ministries. The building is approximately 9,300 square metres (100,000 sq ft), although some portions of the building are not used by the museum. The building contains eight galleries, which includes 2,200 square metres (24,000 sq ft) of exhibition space. In addition to its exhibits, the museum also maintains technical areas including a conservation lab, workshop, preparation rooms, a 185-seat theatre, storage facilities, gift shop and conference rooms.

The museum's white Tyndall stone facade building was originally erected as a government office building in 1978, and was named after former Premier of Saskatchewan, Tommy Douglas. The museum did not move into the building until 1990. In September 2002, the museum completed a C$8.3 million renovation, which saw the removal and reinstallation of the building's Tyndall stone facade, to install vapour barrier seals; replacement of all windows, and replacement of the roof's membrane. The renovations to the building was conducted in order meet environmental sensitivity needs for the exhibition of certain artworks.

In addition to the building, the museum also maintains an outdoor sculpture garden located southwest of the building's main entrance. The sculpture garden was opened on Canada Day in 1999. The sculpture garden exhibits works from the museum's permanent collection, as well as other works on long-term loan from the Saskatchewan Arts Board.

== Permanent collection ==
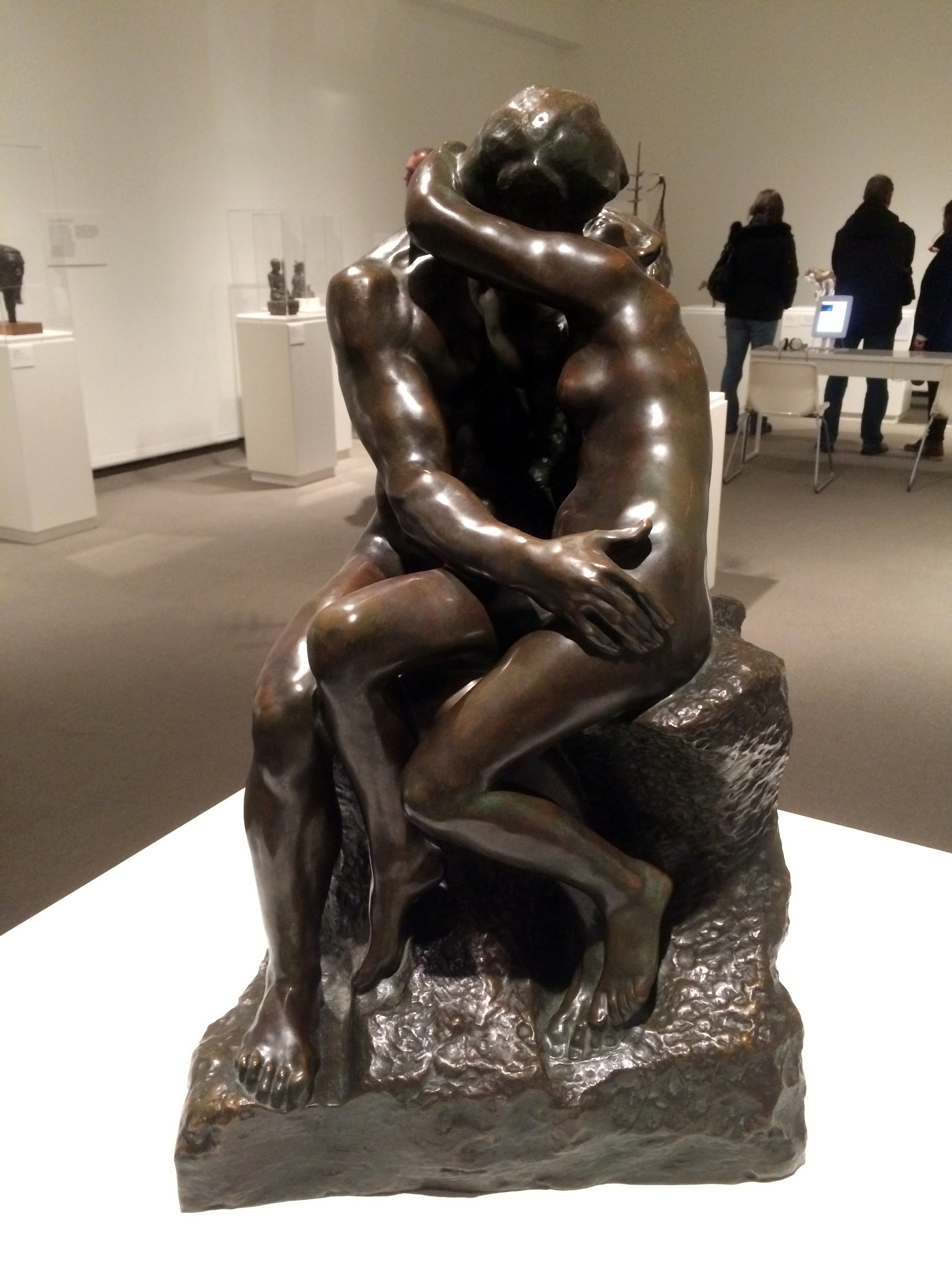
The Kiss, by Auguste Rodin (1900). The sculpture is a part of the museum's permanent collection.

As of 2019, the museum's permanent collection holds over 5,000 works, spanning a period of 5,000 years. The museum's mandate includes providing the public with an encyclopedic range of different forms of culture and visual arts. However, its collection maintains a large focus on art from Canada, particularly indigenous Canadian artists, artists from Saskatchewan, as well as artists from the rest of Western Canada.

The museum's permanent collection originates from the private collections of Norman MacKenzie, bequeathed to the museum in 1936. In 1953, the college opened a museum to exhibit the works. The museum's collection continued to expanded, with the museum and its collection later being incorporated as an institution independent of the university in 1990. The museum's permanent collection includes works by Saskatchewan-based artists, Joe Fafard, and David Thauberger; in addition to non-Canadian artists like Hans Hoffman, Pablo Picasso, Auguste Rodin, and Andy Warhol.

The museum was one of the first Canadian art museums to exhibit works from indigenous Canadian as pieces of fine art, exhibiting its first piece in 1975. In January 2019, the museum received a donation of 1,000 works by contemporary indigenous artists from Canada and Native Americans in the United States, with the donation partly made because of the MacKenzie's early history with the exhibition of indigenous works. The donors, Thomas Druyan and Alice Ladner, further announced that their remaining collection, as well as any works acquired by them since their donation, would be gifted to the museum upon their deaths.

The museum also has a number of outdoor artworks in its permanent collection, most of which are exhibited at the MacKenzie Sculpture Garden, situated south of the museum building. The sculpture garden includes the Bronze Mother and Child II statute by Jacques Lipchitz. As a part of the museum's commemoration of the 150th anniversary of Canada in 2017, the museum commissioned for an outdoor art display by indigenous Canadian artists; budgeted at C$315,000, most of which was paid for by the Department of Canadian Heritage. The museum intended for the commissioned work to reflect on the country's national commemoration, efforts on reconciliation, and intercultural relations. The 30 metres (98 ft) artwork was installed in May 2018, on the exterior facade of the building, facing Albert Street. Titled Kâkikê/Forever by Duane Linklater, the piece is made up of large custom-built acrylic letters made of LED lights and aluminum and read "As long as the sun shines, the river flows.

== Publications ==
The art museum has issued a number of publications. A selected sample of these publications include:

- The continental clay connection : Norman Mackenzie Art Gallery, University of Regina, Regina, Saskatchewan, September 12 to October 19, 1980, Regina, Sask.: The Gallery, 1980, ISBN 0-920922-06-6
- Riddell, W A (1987), The Mackenzie Art Gallery : Norman Mackenzie's legacy, Regina, Saskatchewan: Mackenzie Art Gallery, ISBN 0-920922-62-7
- Swinton, Nelda (1990), The Jacqui and Morris Shumiatcher collection of Inuit art : an exhibition organized by the Norman Mackenzie Art Gallery, University of Regina, Regina, Saskatchewan, Canada, Regina: The Gallery, ISBN 0-920922-08-2
- Phillips, Catalogue Designed by C (1982), Early domestic architecture in Regina : presentation drawings and plans : an exhibition organized by the Norman Mackenzie Art Gallery, University of Regina, Regina, Saskatchewan, 1982, Regina: the Gallery, ISBN 0-920922-10-4
- Cicansky : Victor Cicansky, clay sculpture, Regina, Sask.: Norman Mackenzie Art Gallery, University of Regina, 1983, ISBN 0-920922-15-5
- New work by a new generation : Norman Mackenzie Art Gallery, University of Regina, Regina, Saskatchewan, Canada, July 9 to Aug 29, 1982 : a cooperative project of the World Assembly of First Nations, the Saskatchewan Indian Federated College and the Norman Mackenzie Art Gallery, Regina: The MacKenzie Gallery, 1982, ISBN 0-920922-13-9

== See also ==
- List of art museums
- List of museums in Saskatchewan
- Michelle LaVallee, artist, curator, and educator
