= Rainbow Stage =

Open-air theatre in Kildonan Park in Winnipeg, Manitoba, Canada

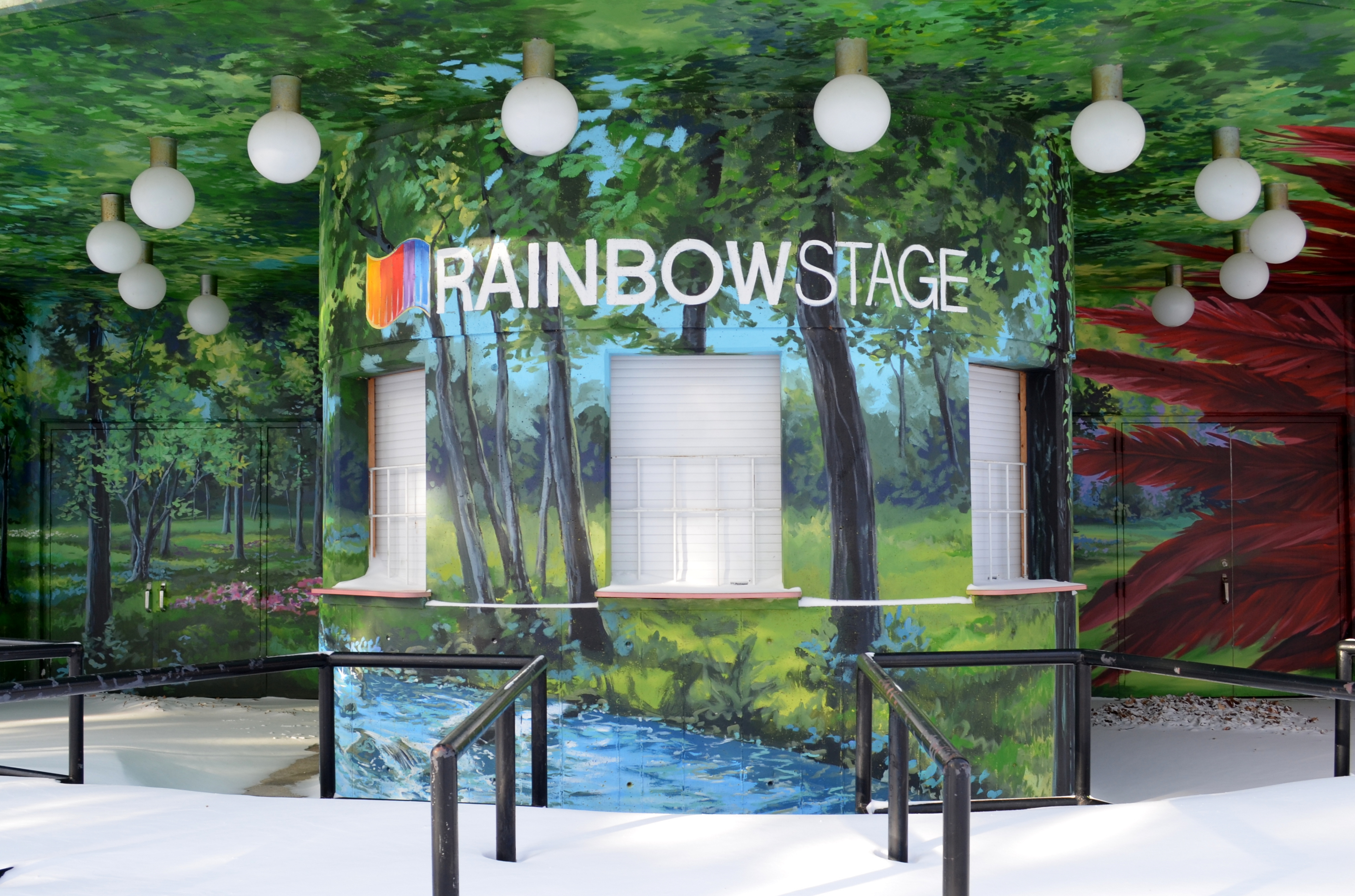
- Front entrance of Rainbow Stage in Kildonan Park
- Interactive map of Rainbow Stage
- Address: 2021 Main St., Winnipeg, MB
- Coordinates: 49°56′31″N 97°06′02″W
- Elevation: 232 metres (761 ft)
- Capacity: 2,600
- Type: Outdoor theatre venue
- Public transit: 18 North Main / 18 Corydon

Construction
- Groundbreaking: 1951
- Built: 1951 to 1953
- Opened: 22 September 1953 (first show); 7 July 1954; 72 years ago (official opening)
- Renovated: 1970, 1976, 1986
- Architects: Smith, Carter, Katelnikoff
- Company
- Name: Rainbow Stage Inc.
- Type: registered charitable organization
- Formed: April 20, 1993
- Headquarters: 202-1215 Henderson Hwy, Winnipeg, MB R2G1L8
- Executives: Adrian Frost, Chair; Jeff Peeler, Vice Chair
- Revenue: $2.8 million CAD (2018)
- Employees: 9 full-time, 61 part-time (2020)
Website

Rainbow Stage is a not-for-profit musical theatre company and outdoor theatre operator, located in Kildonan Park in north Winnipeg, Manitoba. The covered amphitheatre seats up to 2,600 people and operates from May to September.

== Background ==
During the early twentieth century, Winnipeg's public parks evolved beyond ornamental green spaces to become important centres for recreation, entertainment, and civic life. Kildonan Park, one of the city's largest parks, regularly hosted concerts, dances, community celebrations, and other outdoor events. In 1917, a permanent bandstand was constructed, establishing the park as one of Winnipeg's principal outdoor entertainment venues.

Throughout the 1920s and 1930s, the Kildonan Park Bandstand became a popular gathering place. Among its best-known events were the Winnipeg Tribune's "Nights of Community Song", large public sing-alongs held during the Great Depression that drew thousands of participants. The bandstand also hosted concerts, dance competitions, and other public performances, reflecting the growing importance of outdoor entertainment in Winnipeg's park system.

This tradition came to an abrupt end during the 1950 Red River flood, when floodwaters destroyed the bandstand along with thousands of homes and buildings across Manitoba. Although there was broad agreement that the site should remain a public performance venue, civic leaders recognized that public tastes had changed. Traditional bandstands had declined in popularity, while outdoor musical theatre had emerged as a successful attraction elsewhere in North America.

Looking to Vancouver for inspiration, the Winnipeg Junior Chamber of Commerce and the Civic Music League proposed replacing the bandstand with a permanent open-air theatre modelled on Theatre Under the Stars in Stanley Park. Rather than restoring the former structure, the new venue was envisioned as a home for musical theatre that would showcase local performers, attract visitors, and establish Winnipeg as a summer theatre destination.

== History ==
The Civic Music League led the fundraising campaign for the construction of the new stage, and involved radio contests, a limerick competition, and canvassing at local businesses. Public fundraising ultimately brought in $15,000, with another $15,000 being offered by the Winnipeg government.

The new theatre received its named after architect Dennis Carter brought a cardboard model of the design with him to a meeting one night, and someone had observed that if lights were strung along the top curvature, "it would look like a rainbow."

Construction began in 1951 and was completed in the spring of 1952, with additional work on the amphitheatre being completed in 1953. Though some construction was still needing to be done, the Rainbow Stage saw its first concert on 22 September 1953, performed by the touring Kitsilano Boys Band from Vancouver. Between 1953 and 1954, pergola walkways were constructed on either side of the amphitheatre.

On 7 July 1954, the Rainbow Stage was officially opened, featuring a benefit concert with Bill Walker as the night's MC. Performing first was the Ukrainian Youth Association, followed by the James Duncan chorus who performed songs from the musical Carousel; other performers included Walker himself with Len Adree, as well as Eric Wild and his CBC Orchestra, and the Jewish Community Choir with Cantor Benjamin Brownstone.

In its opening year, the stage saw 19 performances to a combined audience of more than 19,000. The first full-length musical to be presented was Brigadoon, in the fall of 1955.

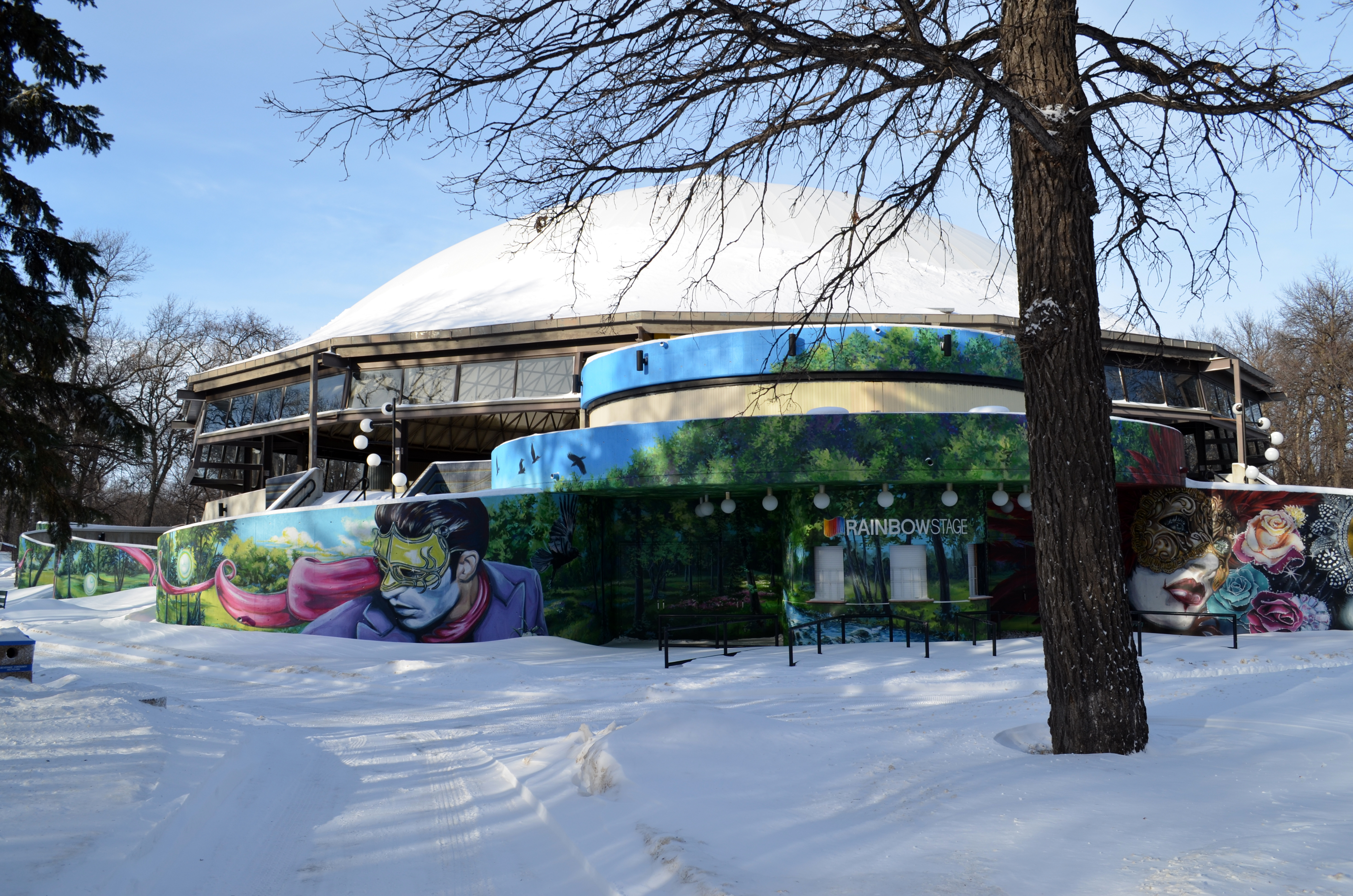
Rainbow Stage in Kildonan Park

The first original production at Rainbow Stage came in 1990 with the musical review Say It With Music. The performance featured songs from various musicals.

In 2011, the building's exterior was painted in an extensive mural by local artists Mandy Van Leeuwen and Michel Saint Hilaire. Painting began June 1 and the finished murals were unveiled in August. The mural covers 740 square metres (8,000 square feet) of concrete and required 400 colours of latex paint.

After a successful and critically acclaimed 2013 season, 2014 saw the summer playbill feature three shows for the first time in over 30 years.

In 2025, Rainbow Stage announced its first extensive renovation to the building since 1986, including safety and accessibility improvements to the front-of-house, courtyard, theatre education, and box office spaces, as well as the removal of the 2011 mural after fourteen years. The renovations are split into several phases, with Phase 1 completed in Summer 2026.

== Architecture ==
Originally, Rainbow Stage was designed by Winnipeg architects Ernest J. Smith, Dennis H. Carter, and Walter Katelnikoff as a covered open-air amphitheatre. The theatre was originally constructed with seating for approximately 3,000 spectators.

In 1970, a triodetic dome was constructed over the theatre. Designed by architect Jack Ross and constructed by the Dominion Bridge Company, the steel dome spans more than 48 metres (157 ft) and rises more than 12 metres (39 ft) above the seating area. It is supported by 12 latticed girder columns around its perimeter. The design was inspired by the geodesic dome of the United States Pavilion at Expo 67.

During the 1970s, renovations added a new box office, washrooms, and seating. Extensive use of exposed concrete gave the public-facing portions of the theatre a Brutalist appearance. Between 1977 and 1978, the dome's original fabric covering was replaced with a plastic membrane.

In 1986, the theatre was expanded with the addition of a fly gallery, carpentry and paint shops, classrooms, and enlarged dressing rooms. Two years later, in 1988, a replica of the theatre's original timber entrance arch and a commemorative plaque were installed at the main entrance.

== Leadership ==
When Rainbow Stage opened in 1954, it was administered by the Winnipeg Parks Board, which operated the theatre as a community venue for concerts and public performances. On 29 February 1956, responsibility for the theatre was transferred to the Winnipeg Summer Theatre Association, which was established to produce summer musical theatre and provide opportunities for local performers. During its first season, the association appointed chorus director James Duncan as talent coordinator and engaged New York producer Michael McAloney to oversee productions, marking a shift toward larger professional musical theatre.

By the mid-1960s, Rainbow Stage was facing significant financial difficulties. After the theatre accumulated an operating deficit of approximately $85,000, creditors agreed not to pursue bankruptcy proceedings, and the non-profit organization Rainbow Stage Inc. was chartered in 1966 to operate the theatre. Lawyer and politician Sidney Spivak became president, while Winnipeg musician and broadcaster Jack Shapira was appointed managing director and producer. Shapira remained in executive leadership until his resignation in 1988.

Following Shapira's departure, Rainbow Stage entered a period of leadership transition. Jerrett Enns became general manager in 1991. Ken Peter joined the board of directors in 1993 and became the theatre's senior administrator in 1998, serving in executive leadership until his death in 2011.

In 2012, Rainbow Stage appointed theatre director Ray Hogg as artistic director and promoted arts administrator Julie Eccles to executive director. After Hogg resigned in 2017, Rainbow Stage appointed Manitoba theatre artist Carson Nattrass as artistic director following an extensive search process.

== Productions ==
Rainbow Stage has presented the following shows in its history:

=== 1950s ===
- 1955 - Brigadoon
- 1956 - The Wizard of Oz, Annie Get Your Gun, Our Town, Kiss Me, Kate
- 1957 - Can-Can, Pitfalls of Pauline, Do You Remember, I Remember Mama, Gentlemen Prefer Blondes, Chu Chin Chow, Pot O'Gold Variety Show
- 1958 - The King and I, Hell's A' Poppin', Brigadoon
- 1959 - Guys and Dolls, Show Boat, The Wizard of Oz

=== 1960s ===
- 1960 - The Pajama Game, Damn Yankees!, Carousel
- 1961 - South Pacific, High Button Shoes, The Most Happy Fella
- 1962 - The Music Man, The Student Prince, Oklahoma!
- 1963 - West Side Story, The King and I, Bye, Bye Birdie
- 1964 - The Sound of Music, Anything Goes, Finian's Rainbow, Gypsy: A Musical Fable
- 1965 - Flower Drum Song, Can-Can, Guys and Dolls, Annie Get Your Gun
- 1966 - My Fair Lady, South Pacific
- 1967 - Oliver!, The Sound of Music
- 1968 - Carnival!, The Music Man
- 1969 - The King and I, Funny Girl

=== 1970s ===
- 1970 - The Wizard of Oz, Hello, Dolly!
- 1971 - Peter Pan, Fiddler on the Roof
- 1972 - Cinderella, Mame
- 1973 - Where's Charley?, Annie Get Your Gun
- 1974 - The Sound of Music, No, No, Nanette
- 1975 - My Fair Lady
- 1976 - Oklahoma!, Brigadoon
- 1977 - Irene, Fiddler on the Roof
- 1978 - Oliver!, Hello, Dolly!
- 1979 - The King and I, The Desert Song

=== 1980s ===
- 1980 - Guys and Dolls, Show Boat
- 1981 - South Pacific, Funny Girl
- 1982 - The Pajama Game, The Music Man
- 1983 - The Pirates of Penzance, Kiss Me, Kate
- 1984 - Kismet, Fiddler on the Roof
- 1985 - H.M.S. Pinafore, Mame
- 1986 - The Student Prince, The Sound of Music
- 1987 - My Fair Lady, Annie, Anne of Green Gables - The Musical
- 1988 - Oliver!, Sweet Charity
- 1989 - Carousel, Peter Pan

=== 1990s ===
- 1990 - Anything Goes, Say It with Music, Cinderella
- 1991 - A Funny Thing Happened on the Way to the Forum, The Wizard of Oz
- 1992 - The Wizard of Oz, Guys and Dolls
- 1993 - Fiddler on the Roof
- 1994 - Brigadoon, Damn Yankees!
- 1995 - Oklahoma!
- 1996 - The Sound of Music
- 1997 - South Pacific
- 1998 - The Music Man
- 1999 - Crazy For You

=== 2000s ===
- 2000 - Singin' in the Rain, 42nd Street
- 2001 - A Chorus Line, Big: The Musical
- 2002 - Fame, West Side Story
- 2003 - Footloose, Joseph and the Amazing Technicolor Dreamcoat
- 2004 - Chicago, The King and I, Beauty and the Beast
- 2005 - Miss Saigon, Good News, Smokey Joe's Cafe, Strike! the Musical
- 2006 - The Wizard of Oz
- 2007 - Grease, The Sound of Music
- 2008 - The Full Monty, Peter Pan, Forever Plaid
- 2009 - Beauty and the Beast

=== 2010s ===
- 2010 - Rent, Joseph and the Amazing Technicolor Dreamcoat
- 2011 - Cats, Hairspray
- 2012 - Footloose, Annie
- 2013 - Buddy - The Buddy Holly Story, Mary Poppins
- 2014 - A Closer Walk With Patsy Cline, The Producers, The Little Mermaid
- 2015 - West Side Story, Les Misérables, Sister Act
- 2016 - Ring Of Fire, Shrek The Musical
- 2017 - Little Shop of Horrors, Mamma Mia!
- 2018 - Breaking Up Is Hard To Do, Beauty and the Beast
- 2019 - Guys and Dolls, Strike! the Musical, Rodgers and Hammerstein's Cinderella

=== 2020s ===
- 2020 - Pot of Gold Benefit Concert
- 2021 - Resilience: A Digital Concert, Pot of Gold '21 Benefit Concert, Ma-Buhay! Filipinos Singing for Their Lives Staged Reading
- 2022 - The Hockey Sweater, The Wizard of Oz
- 2023 - Rent, The Little Mermaid, Afterlight
- 2024 - Ma-Buhay! A New Musical, Mary Poppins, Miss Shakespeare
- 2025 - Rock of Ages, Frozen The Musical, Afterlight
- 2026 - Jesus Christ Superstar, Legally Blonde, Fiddler on the Roof

=== Full-length musicals ===
The first full-length musical to be presented at Rainbow Stage was Brigadoon, in the fall of 1955. Since then most of the productions have been of Broadway musicals, including Annie Get Your Gun (1956, 1965, 1973), Kiss Me, Kate (1956, 1983), The King and I (1958, 1963, 1969, 1979, 2004), Guys and Dolls (1959, 1965, 1980, 1992, 2019), Damn Yankees (1960, 1994), The Music Man (1962, 1968, 1982, 1998), My Fair Lady (1966, 1975, 1987), The Sound of Music (1964, 1967, 1974, 1986, 1996, 2007), Carousel (1960, 1989), Cinderella (1972, 1990, 2019) and Anything Goes (1964, 1990). In 1990, Rainbow Stage presented its first original production, the musical revue Say It With Music, "put together by Manitobans for Manitobans" featuring songs from The Wizard of Oz, The Music Man, Kismet, Gypsy, West Side Story, Fiddler on the Roof, and other musicals.

== Company ==
The company, officially Rainbow Stage Inc., is a registered charitable organization. Formed on April 30, 1993, it is governed by a board of directors and managed by 7 full-time staff.

Rainbow Stage features Canadian actors, musicians and production team members, many of whom are hired locally. Stars for some productions include the directors John Hirsch and Peggy Jarman Green; the conductors Filmer Hubble and Eric Wild; the singing actors Evelyne Anderson, Len Cariou, Ed Evanko, Cliff Gardiner, Morley Meredith, and Bill Walker; the chorus director James Duncan; and the Royal Winnipeg Ballet artistic director Arnold Spohr. Other Canadian performers at Rainbow Stage have included Jan Rubeš, Roma Hearn, Catherine McKinnon, and Wally Koster. The 2011 production of Hairspray featured American actor George Wendt in the role of Edna Turnblad.

In 2018, Rainbow Stage made a revenue of CA$2.8 million—2% coming from sponsorships, 3% from government (municipal, provincial, and federal), 8% from donations and fundraising, and the rest from earned income (i.e., ticket sales, concessions, souvenirs).
