= Music of Eric Wild =

- Genre: Music
- Presented by: Marsh Phimister
- Country of origin: Canada
- Original language: English
- No. of seasons: 1

Production
- Producer: Neil Andrews

Original release
- Network: CBC Television
- Release: 28 May – 25 June 1961

Music of Eric Wild is a Canadian music television program that aired on CBC Television in 1961.

== Premise ==
This Winnipeg-produced series featured Eric Wild conducting a 17-person orchestra. Among the guest artists were singers Len Cariou, Ed Evanko, Florence Faiers, Evelyn Snider and Maxine Ware. Pianist Mitch Parks and violinist Marta Hidy were also guests.

== Scheduling ==
This half-hour series was broadcast Sundays at 4:30 p.m. (Eastern) from 28 May to 25 June 1961.

== See also ==
- Music Stand
