= Dennis Carter =

Dennis Carter may refer to:

- Dennis Malone Carter (c. 1820–1881), Irish-American painter
- Dennis H. Carter (1920–2012), Canadian architect and amateur filmmaker
- Dennis Carter (sprinter), winner of the 1982 4 × 440 yard relay at the NCAA Division I Indoor Track and Field Championships

== See also ==
- Dennis Dottin-Carter (born 1981), American football coach
- Denis Carter, Baron Carter (1932–2006), British agriculturalist and politician
