= John A. Macdonald Memorial (Grandmaison) =

Sculpture of John A. Macdonald by Sonia de Grandmaison and John Cullen Nugent

Coordinates: 50.447547°N 104.612346°W

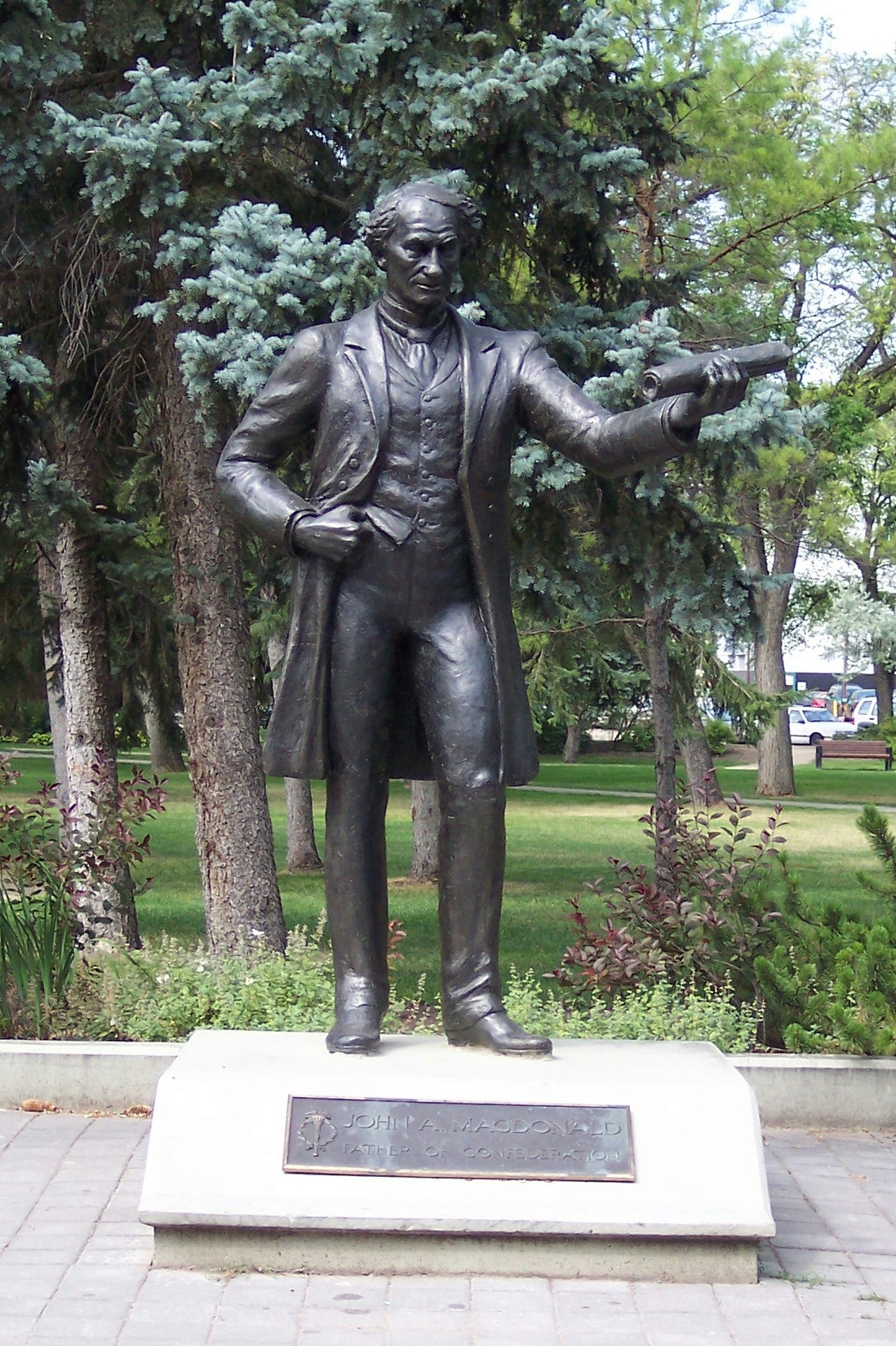
- Former location of memorial
- Artist: Sonia de Grandmaison; John Cullen Nugent
- Year: 1967
- Medium: Bronze
- Subject: John A. Macdonald
- Dimensions: 1.874 m × 1.905 m × 0.518 m (6.15 ft × 6.25 ft × 1.70 ft)
- Location: Regina, Saskatchewan, Canada

The John A. Macdonald Memorial was a public sculpture in bronze of John A. Macdonald by Sonia de Grandmaison and John Cullen Nugent, formerly located at the south entrance to Victoria Park, Regina, Saskatchewan, Canada. In March 2021, Regina city council voted to remove the statue and it was taken down the following month.

== Description ==
The bronze sculpture was cast in five pieces by using a "lost wax technique", and soldered together by artist John Cullen Nugent, a technique he learned from candlemaking. It stands 1.874 × 1.905 × 0.518 m. The plaque underneath the statue reads "John A. Macdonald, Father of Confederation."

== History ==
Fundraising in Regina for a statue to commemorate Macdonald's achievements as Canada's first Prime Minister began in 1891 after Macdonald's death, but it was not commissioned until 1966. The statue was officially unveiled in 1967, the year of the Canadian Centennial.

=== Calls for removal and vandalism ===
Reassessments of Macondald's role in Canadian history, particularly his assimilationist policies toward Indigenous Canadians and racist views of Asian immigrants, led to statues of Macdonald being vandalized and removed in other cities in the first decades of the 21st century. The Regina memorial was vandalized at least three times between 2012 and 2018.

In August 2017, a petition was launched for the removal of the Regina memorial.

Following the removal of a statue in Victoria, British Columbia in 2018, the Regina memorial was the only Macdonald statue still standing in a major city in Western Canada, one of a "handful" across the country. That year, it was vandalized with spray paint in February and again on 21 August. Vibank musician Patrick Johnson contacted the Regina Leader-Post to claim responsibility, saying it was an act of "peaceful protest", and that he painted the statue's hands red "to symbolize the blood... on Macdonald's hands." He claimed to have also painted the statue before, after the verdict in Gerald Stanley's trial in February.

Regina's mayor at the time Michael Fougere characterized calls to remove the statue as trying "to erase history", but said he would be receptive to the idea of a plaque that would "contextualize" Macdonald, since "many things that he did are certainly difficult to accept by today's standards — and we should know about that." After the statue was vandalized for the third time in August 2018, he reiterated his earlier statements, and added, "it's important to remember MacDonald's contributions to Indigenous and women's voting rights."

In the midst of the 2020 protests against racism and police brutality, which took place worldwide in solidarity with those following the murder of George Floyd while in police custody, and the removal of Confederate States Army statues in the United States, Regina faced new calls to remove the Macdonald statue. Early in June, it was reported that the statue was on a list of fifteen statues across Canada subject to petition for removal.

On March 31, 2021, Regina city council voted 7–4 in favour of removal of the statue citing that the "statue overlooks the negative impacts Macdonald's policies and initiatives have had on Indigenous peoples." The statue will be put into storage while the city does public consultations to find a new location. It was finally removed and put into storage in April 2021.
