= Music Stand =

- Genre: Music
- Presented by: Marsh Phimister (1963); George LaFleche (1964)
- Country of origin: Canada
- Original language: English
- No. of seasons: 2

Production
- Producers: Ray McConnell (1963); Dan Williams (1964)
- Running time: 30 minutes

Original release
- Network: CBC Television
- Release: 12 July 1963 – 17 September 1964

Music Stand is a Canadian music television program that aired on CBC Television from 1963 to 1964.

== Premise ==
This Winnipeg-produced program featured an orchestra led by Eric Wild. Featured artists included Florence Faiers, Mary Nowell and Jim Pirie.

== Scheduling ==
The first season of this half-hour series was broadcast on Friday nights from 5 July to 20 September 1963 at 9:00 p.m. except for the 8:00 p.m. debut episode. The second season was broadcast Thursdays at 9:30 p.m. from 2 July to 17 September 1964.

== See also ==
- Music of Eric Wild
