= Ernest J. Smith =

Canadian architect

Ernest Smith FRAIC RCA
- Born: 17 December 1919; Winnipeg, Manitoba, Canada
- Died: 22 October 2004 (aged 84); The Pas, Manitoba, Canada
- Education: University of Manitoba
- Occupation: Architect
- Spouse: Marjorie Smith
- Children: 3
- Awards: RAIC Gold Medal
- Buildings: Westworth United Church; Canadian Grain Commission; Woodsworth Building; Smith Residence; Hillside Beach Retirement Home

Ernest John Smith RCA was a Canadian architect.

Both he and his partner Dennis Carter, with whom he founded Smith Carter, were, according to Jeffrey Thorsteinson, among several "significant modern architects" who graduated from the University of Manitoba's architecture program prior to 1946, and who were "vital to the rise of a notable regional strain of Canadian architecture" referred to as Manitoba modernism.

Architectural historian Kelly Crossman remarks that in the 1950s Manitoba architectural firms "consistently ranked among the best in the country" and that the provincial capitol Winnipeg "played a significant role as an early centre of architectural modernism in Canada", identifying Smith Carter as one of two "especially" important Winnipeg design firms. Their work included "major projects, public and private." One of the most "prolific and influential" design firms in Winnipeg, they earned a reputation in the 1950s and 1960s for "slick, understated, lucid, refined and experimental architecture keyed directly into site and landscape" which "changed the urban character" of the city.

== Early life and education ==
Ernest Smith was born on 17 December 1919 in Winnipeg, and grew up in the neighbourhood of Wolseley, on Aubrey Street.

Smith studied architecture at the University of Manitoba, described as "notably progressive" at the time. He won the Royal Architectural Institute of Canada Gold Medal, and a postgraduate fellowship to attend the MIT, where he earned a Master of Architecture degree. While at MIT, Smith became interested in large project planning and housing developments, attending seminars by "leading experts in the field," including Catherine Bauer Wurster and Charles Abrams. Smith finished his thesis in September 1947 and came home to honour a commitment he made with fellow alumni Dennis Carter (another RAIC Gold Medal winner) and Walter Katelnikoff that they three would start their own firm upon his return to Winnipeg.

== Career ==
=== Foundation (1947–1959) ===
The business partnership was initially formed as Smith Carter Katelnikoff with offices on 289½ Garry Street. Smith also taught design at the University of Manitoba while the practice was being established. Smith Carter Katelnikoff made their name locally with the 1948 renovation of their own offices on Portage Avenue East and, due to the demand created by Winnipeg's expanding population in the 1950s, several schools. (Note: Among others: École Varennes, École Marion, Norwood Collegiate Institute (since replaced by Nelson McIntyre Collegiate), Glenlawn Collegiate, Silver Heights Junior High (now Silver Heights Collegiate), and Hampstead School.) At the same time, the firm grew on the strength of commissions for large schools in rural Manitoba and Western Canada where modern centralized facilities were replacing one-room schools. Smith served as the managing partner of the firm (which had various names and partners through the years) for thirty-eight years until his retirement in 1985.

In the 1950s, as the firm's commissions grew, attention was increasingly paid to interiors and the selection of materials suitable for the local culture and climate. The firm designed Canada's longest running venue for outdoor theatre, Rainbow Stage (1951–1953). In 1953 and 1954, Smith acted as president of the Manitoba Association of Architects, and again from 1956 to 1961. Around this time, Smith designed his family home.

==== Westworth United Church ====
Westworth United Church features a finely wrought modernist architectural vocabulary. Well-considered proportions, materials, and such details as the projecting decorative brick cross-pattern on the east wall make this a noteworthy ensemble. Architectural thought was even extended to the diminutive original church signage, which is framed in brick.

— Winnipeg Architecture Foundation

One of Smith's personally significant projects from this period is Westworth United Church (1958–1959), consisting of two major additions to an education building (a gymnasium) designed by Green Blankstein Russell in 1950. The additions, a central narthex and towering sanctuary, needed to "tie in with the existing building and yet give the sanctuary a dominating position." The church includes large stained-glass windows by Leo Mol (1959).

=== Scaling up (1959–1985) ===
The design and construction of the University of Manitoba's School of Architecture (1958–1959) won the firm a Massey Medal.

Smith Carter were Massey Medal finalists for the Monarch Life Building (1959–1963; since 1999, the Workers Compensation Board of Manitoba Building), described as a "paragon of modernist order and dignity". The design team, led by Carter, sought to express "the bold confidence and security of the corporation, its concern for its clients and employees, as well as its commitment to the economic development of the city of Winnipeg."

==== Transformation of Portage and Main ====
During the 1960s and 1970s, Smith served in a number of industry association senior positions, including president of the Manitoba Association of Architects (1956–1961) and chairman of the National Joint Committee on Construction Materials (1963–1965). He was dean of the College of Fellows of the RAIC from 1972 to 1975, and chancellor of the RAIC itself in 1979.

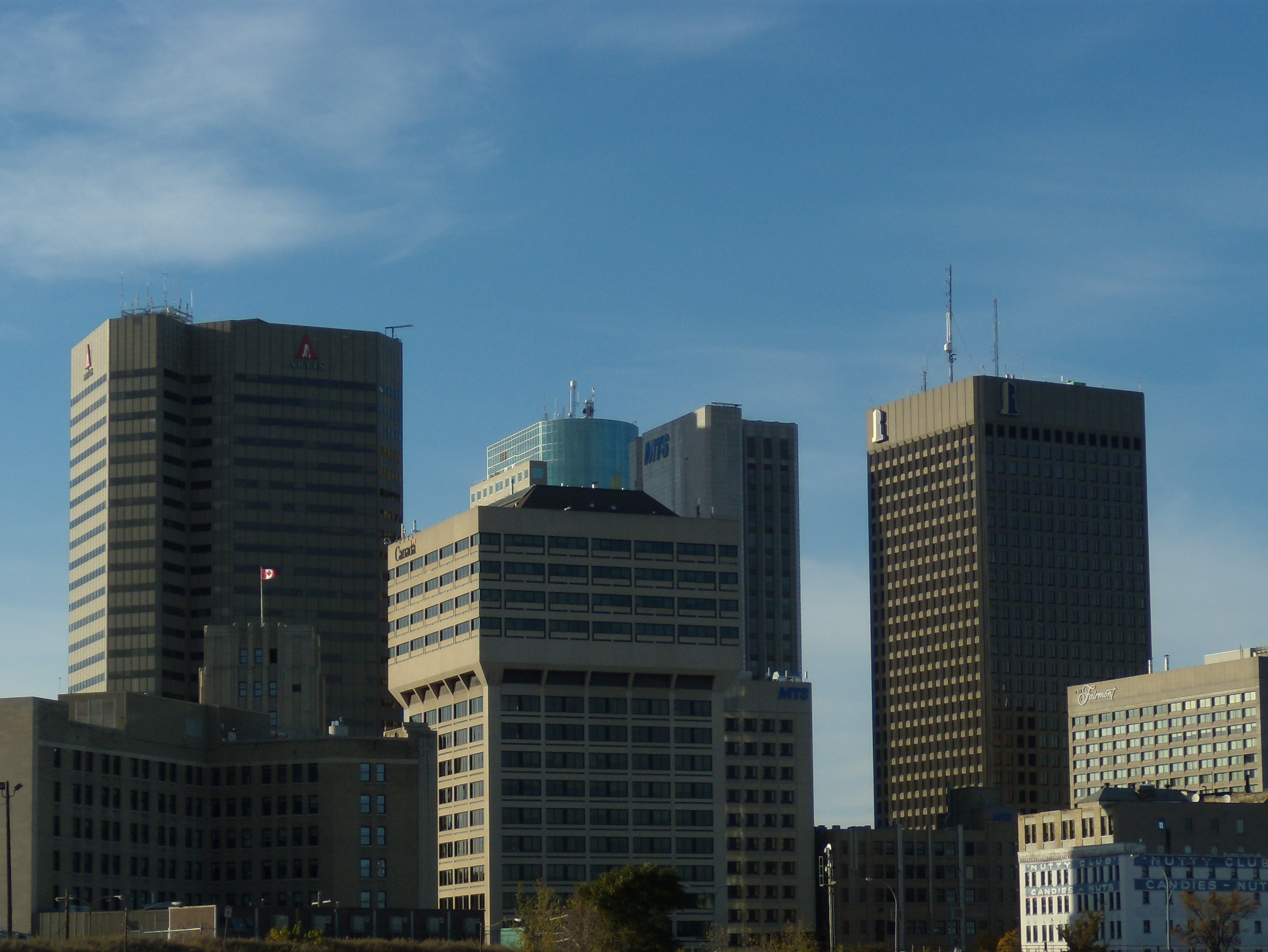
Cluster of tall buildings in Downtown Winnipeg, near Portage and Main, from left to right: Commodity Exchange Tower, Canadian Grain Commission, and Richardson Building.

Throughout the 1960s, the City of Winnipeg conducted transport studies which led to a rethinking of traffic flow through Portage Avenue and Main Street, the city's hub, and had Smith Carter conduct the transit forecast studies which concluded that mixing pedestrian and vehicular traffic would no longer be viable, ultimately leading to the construction of an underground concourse replacing the four sidewalks of the corner. Significant or large scale works during this period include the Canadian Wheat Board and Grain Commission buildings (1962 and 1970, respectively), the Royal Bank of Canada and Bank of Canada buildings (1965 and 1971), the Pan Am Pool (1967), and the Manitoba Centennial Centre (1967–1972). (Note: The Centre consists of the Centennial Concert Hall (1960), the Plantetarium (1968) and Manitoba Museum (1970, as part of a consortium), and the Manitoba Theatre Centre, which was built by the Number Ten firm of architects.) One of the firm's most identifiable works from the period, and "one of the most identifiable landmarks of the city" is the Richardson Building (1967–1969; with Skidmore, Owings and Merrill as consulting architects), It forms the anchor of the Lombard Place development, which includes the Winnipeg Inn (1970, currently the Fairmont Hotel) and the underground concourse later connected to Trizec's Winnipeg Square shopping mall (1979) and the Commodity Exchange Tower (1974–1979, often referred to as the "Trizec Building" locally). Other large scale projects included the Woodsworth Building on Broadway (1973), The Great-West Life Assurance Company (1983), and the Air Canada building (1985).

For a few years during this period (1969 to 1971), Smith Carter merged with Parkin Architects, thereby becoming, briefly, "the largest architectural and engineering concern in the country and the tenth largest in the world."

==== Canadian Grain Commission Building ====
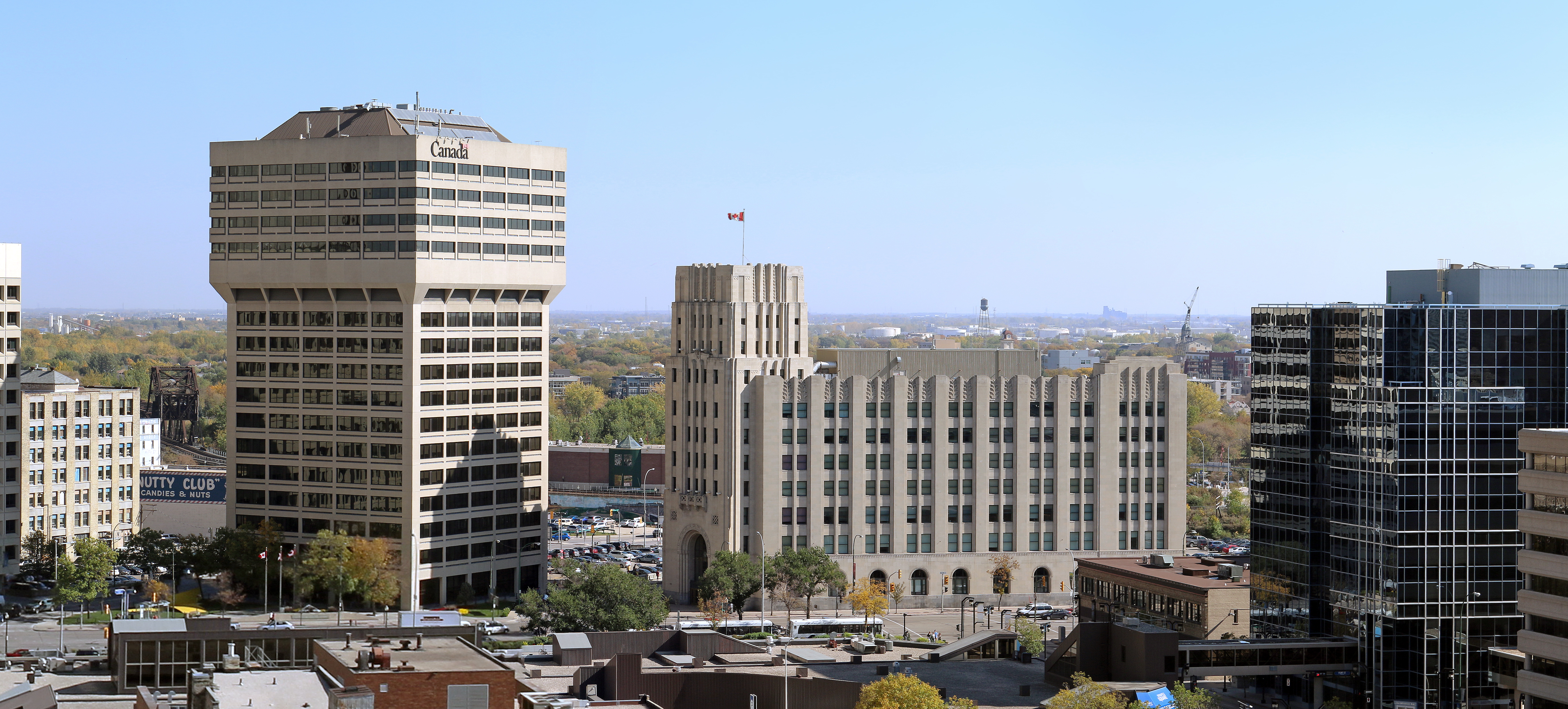
Smith, the principal architect of the Canadian Grain Commission, was also closely involved in the process of obtaining a suitable sculpture for its exterior (No. 1 Northern, bottom left). Nicknamed the "mushroom building", the structure itself is a "notable example" of a Canadian skyscraper displaying Brutalist elements.

Smith was the principal architect of the Grain Commission building. Smith remarked on the challenges involved:

Mixing two different functions in a vertical building is difficult. Normally construction would be separated horizontally. In this case, we worked out two separate modules for offices and lab space, [and] found we needed greater depth in the lab and rationalised the present form.

The firm recommended a large scale exterior sculpture for the building, notifying Public Works Canada in June 1972. In April 1973, Smith met with the Regional Committee member, Kenneth Lochhead, and they "mutually agreed" that the building required a major contemporary work of art for the forecourt, determining a budget of $50,000, with Smith to follow up with a list of artists and in July 1974, a competition was proposed between ten invited artists. In January 1975, five artists, Henry Saxe, Ulysse Comtois, John Nugent, Ricardo Gomez, and Hugh Leroy, were chosen by Smith (with Kenneth Lochhead's advice). The Advisory Committee selected Nugent's No. 1 Northern, a large steel abstract sculpture intended as a metaphor for fields of wheat, represented in multi-layer rectangular shapes and painted the "brilliant" yellow of harvest wheat, designed by Nugent to represent Canada's hardy top grade, red spring wheat hybrid of the same name that dominate the Prairies in the fall.

The work proved controversial after its installation in late 1975, with Earl Baxter, chairman of the Board of Grain Commissioners, leading a campaign in protest shortly after its unveiling, and by July 1978, they had prevailed: the work was dismantled and reinstalled two years later in front of a Revenue Canada building, only to be removed again in 1993. In 1997, almost twenty years after it was removed, Nugent's sculpture was reinstalled in front of the Grain Commission building.

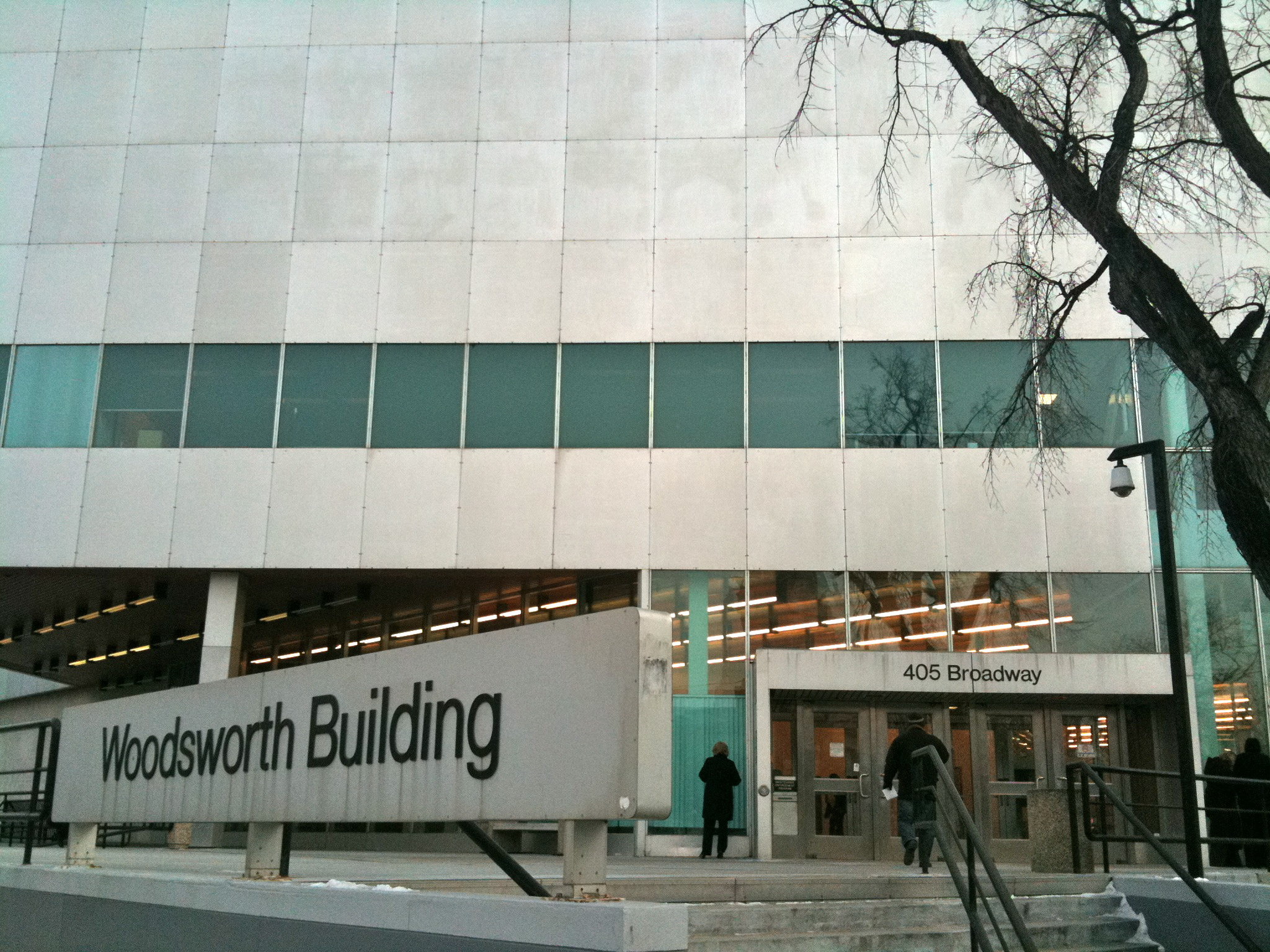
Entrance

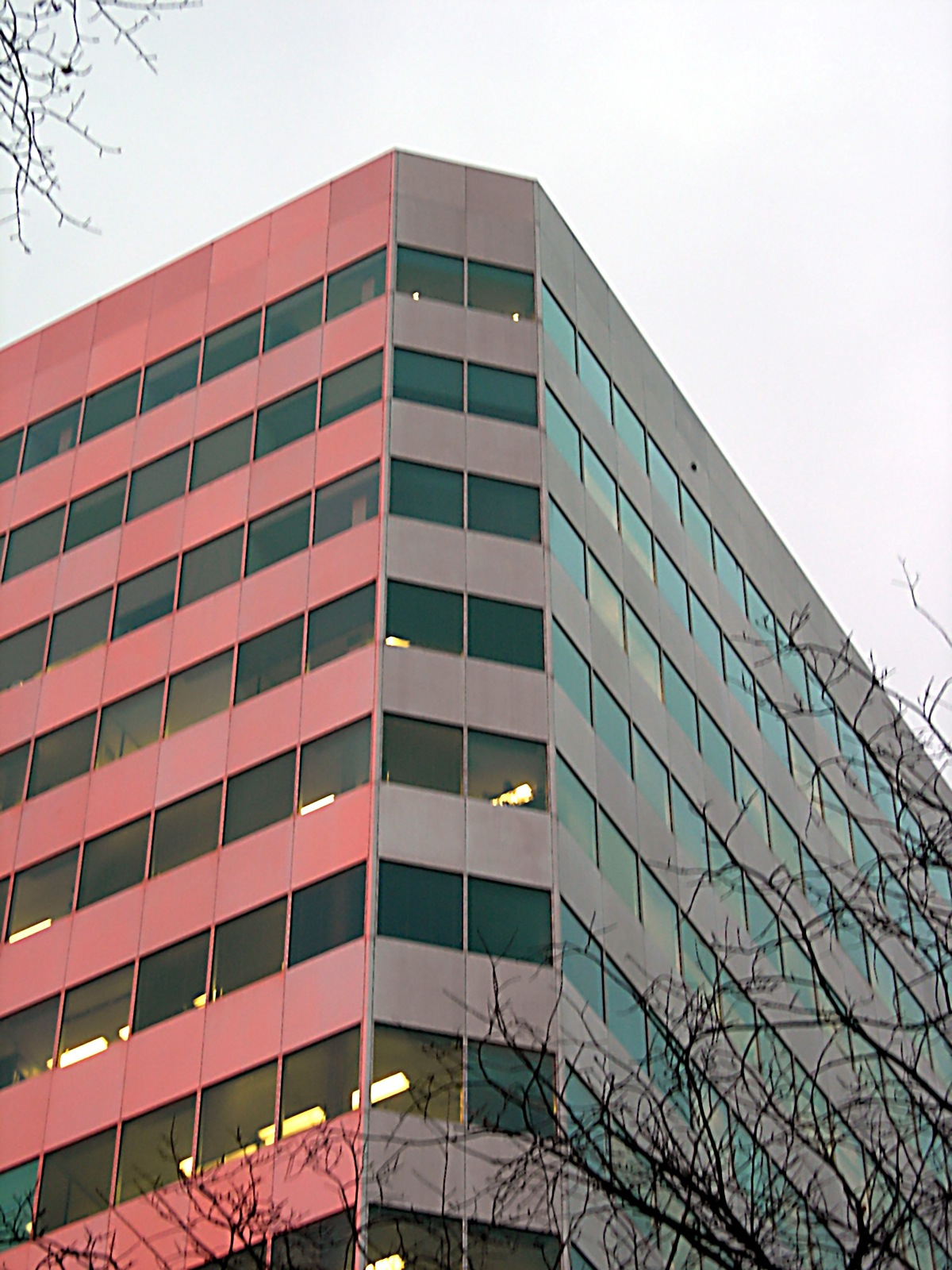
A late afternoon November sunset gives the Woodsworth Building a pink hue.

==== Woodsworth Building ====
Built for the Manitoba government between 1973 and 1976, the Woodsworth building is named after CCF reformer J.S. Wordsworth, a bust of whom, sculpted by Leo Mol, stands on the main floor. There is colourful artwork by Bruce Head, contrasting with the steel and glass of the building.

Designed to be fifteen storeys, there was a civic debate over its height, and the final two storeys were not built until 1976. There was also considerable criticism when the skywalk to the Law Courts Building was constructed in 1974. Smith's original plan was for a tunnel, but the skywalk was chosen as the cheaper alternative.

==== International work ====
Smith was said to have been proudest of the firm's work shaping the Winnipeg skyline and of their work abroad, such the Kermanshah Technical Training Centre in Iran, the Canadian Embassy in Moscow and the Canadian Chancery in Warsaw (about 1965; all but foundations demolished in 2001).

=== Apex and final stages ===
Smith retired in 1985 and moved into a retirement home he designed himself, featured in an exhibition by the Royal Academy of Arts. Meanwhile, Smith Carter's reach extended to high-level biomedical research facilities. Early examples included the St. Boniface Hospital Research Centre (1986–1987) and the John Buhler Research Centre at the Health Sciences Centre (about 1990). The project considered to be "seminal" by Smith Carter was the Canadian Science Centre for Human and Animal Health (1992–1998), one of only two Level 4 laboratories in Canada, establishing the firm as a leader in the design of highly secure laboratory facilities for disease research.

Alongside Dennis Carter, his business partner of thirty-eight years, Ernest Smith was awarded an honorary life membership from the Manitoba Association of Architects in 2000.

=== Other pursuits and community activism ===
A supporter of the arts, Smith was a member of the Winnipeg Art Gallery, the Council of the Royal Canadian Academy of Arts, co-chairman of the Fine Arts Committee for the Centennial Cultural Centre, and the board of the Winnipeg Symphony Orchestra, of which he was president from 1969 to 1971.

== Personal life ==
=== Smith residence ===
When his daughters Lynda and Emily were five years old and one year old respectively, Smith designed his family home in East Kildonan, off Kildonan Drive. The Drive is elevated as a protective flood dike, the house itself was built on land behind the flood dike and therefore quite low, requiring that the living spaces be elevated to the height of the street.

The general plan, a strict rectangle with a central core appendage for entry along with a breezeway and garage on the north side of the house, keeps day- and night-time activities separate. Smith's design allowed the site to be kept at the natural grade: the main entry to the house's upper level is approached by a bridge, while the lower level plan is "at grade, which allows a ramped approach to the garage and garden access at the rear from the family room by sliding glass doors." The ground level entry also eliminated the need for outside steps, which in Winnipeg must be kept clear of snow and ice in winter, the house levels split at this entry point into the upper level (living areas) and lower level (sewing, workshop and heating). Since the house is raised out of the ground, the lower level attains good light from an adequate depth of window.

=== Hillside Beach retirement home ===
Smith spent summers on Lake Winnipeg and at Grand Beach, where he first met his wife Marjorie, with whom he had three children. The retirement home he built in 1985 at Hillside Beach on Lake Winnipeg was featured at the Royal Canadian Academy of Arts "Prairie Region Exhibition" at the Winnipeg and Mackenzie art galleries in 1997 and 1998. Smith remained there after Marjorie died in 1993, moving back to Winnipeg in 1998, and finally to a personal care home in The Pas in 2001, where his son Chris lived.

=== Death ===
Smith died on 22 October 2004. His memorial service took place at Westworth United Church, which he designed during the firm's early years.

== Professional affiliations ==
- Royal Architectural Institute of Canada • Fellow (1963) • Dean (1973–75) • Chancellor (1980–82)
- Royal Canadian Academy of Arts • Council Member
- Manitoba Association of Architects • President (1953–54, 1956–1961) • Life Member (2000)

== Select publications ==
- (with John A. Russell) "School of Architecture, University of Manitoba, Winnipeg." Royal Architectural Institute of Canada Journal 37 (8) (August 1960): 317–328.
