= Kildonan Park =

Regional park in Winnipeg, Manitoba, Canada

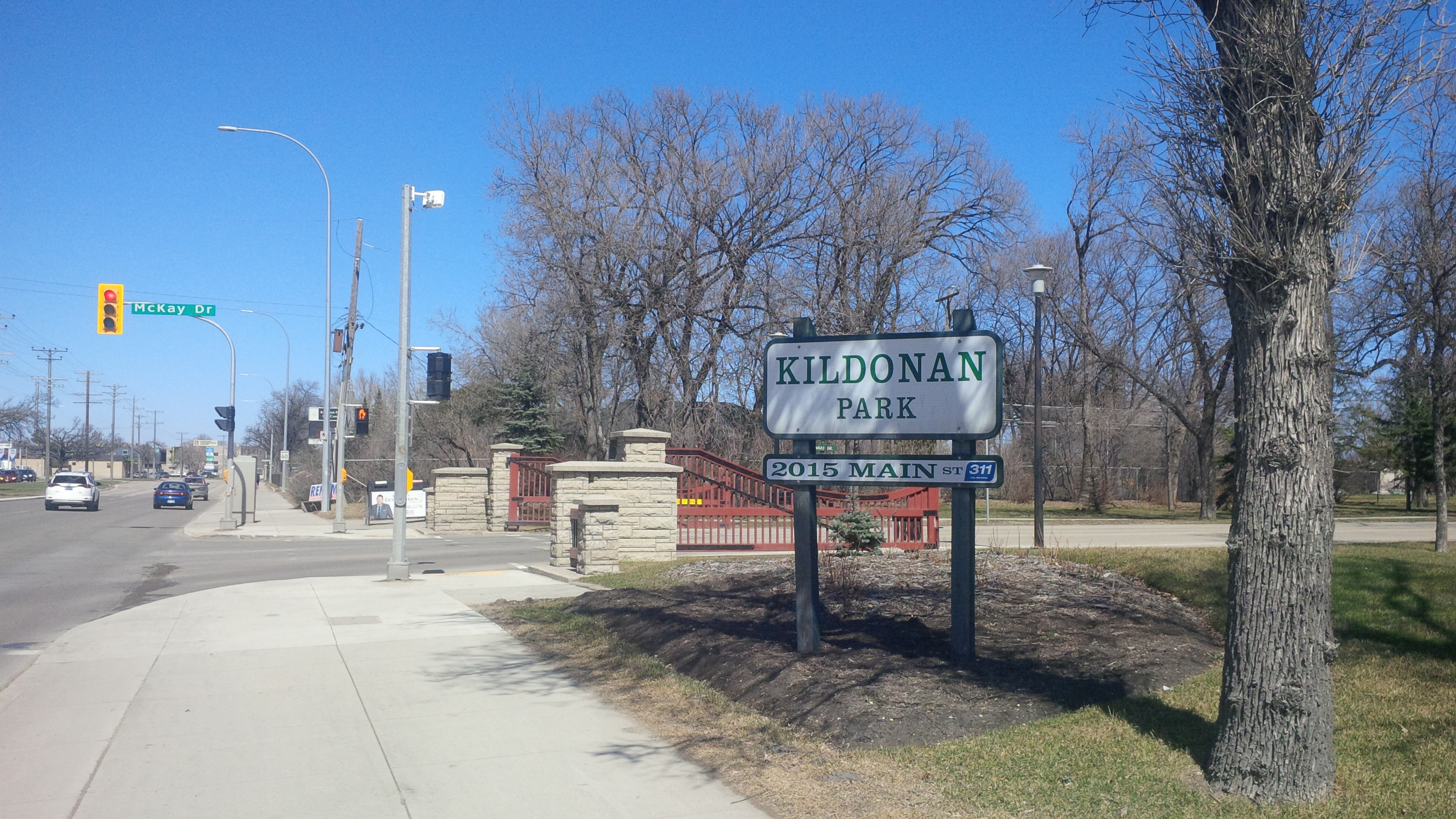
- Interactive map of Kildonan Park
- Location: Winnipeg, Manitoba, Canada
- Coordinates: 49°56′37″N 97°06′10″W
- Area: 96 acres (39 ha)
- Established: 1909; 117 years ago
- Designer: George Champion
- Owner: City of Winnipeg
- Public transit: Winnipeg Transit; D10 31

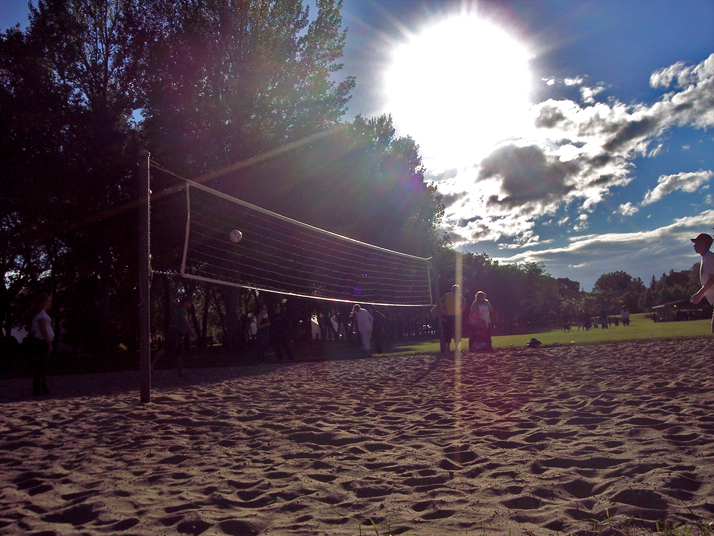
Volleyball at Kildonan Park

Kildonan Park is a park in the West Kildonan area of northern Winnipeg, Manitoba, Canada.

Established in 1909 as a 73-acre (30 ha) park, it features the Peguis Pavilion, Rainbow Stage, the Witch's Hut, an Olympic-sized outdoor swimming pool, duck pond, and soccer field as well as picnic tables and barbecue pits. The Park was originally designed by George Champion who was the park's Superintendent. There are picnic sites and shelters available for rent. In winter the park features a skating pond and two tobogganing slides.

Kildonan Park features 39 hectares (390,000 m^{2}) of park area, 25 hectares (250,000 m^{2}) of mowable turf and 27,000 square metres (2.7 ha) of pathways, including a perimeter path measuring 1.9 kilometres (1.2 mi).

== Background ==
The site selected for Kildonan Park occupied a wooded tract of land along the Red River in what was then the Rural Municipality of Kildonan. The property included mature elm forest, open meadows, Lord Selkirk Creek and river frontage. In 1909, the Winnipeg Parks Board acquired most of the property for the creation of a public park, and Winnipeg Parks Superintendent George Champion prepared plans that incorporated the site's existing natural features into the park's design. Champion's original plan also included a boat landing and marina, although neither was constructed because of concerns over riverbank erosion.

The City acquired the land in stages. Negotiations over a remaining 18-acre (7.3 ha) parcel delayed completion of the project, and at one point the Parks Board considered abandoning the site in favour of another location. After the final parcel was secured, the property was also proposed as the site of permanent Winnipeg Industrial Exhibition grounds. The proposal was not adopted, and the land was developed as Kildonan Park.

Kildonan Park was established in 1909 as a 73-acre (30 ha) public park. The park formally opened on Victoria Day in 1911. George Champion designed the park to incorporate its existing natural landscape while providing space for recreation and public gatherings.

== History ==
In 2013–14, landscape architectural firm Scatliff + Miller + Murray was commissioned to come up with a new vision for Kildonan Park. SMM's report, "The Kildonan Park Master Plan", was published in January 2015. The report identified several issues that, when implemented, would improve the functioning and enjoyment of the park. The report recommends that Lord Selkirk Creek be restored to its pre-dammed state as much as is possible. Input during the public feedback stage for "The Master Plan" indicated a poor wayfinding system, especially for pedestrians. Rainbow Stage has an opportunity to have extended use beyond the seven weeks where live performance theatre events take place. It was suggested in the report that a farmer's market, car show, extending the operating weeks of Rainbow Stage with additional live theatre events, as well as displays of "seasonal art".

== Features ==
=== Rainbow Stage ===
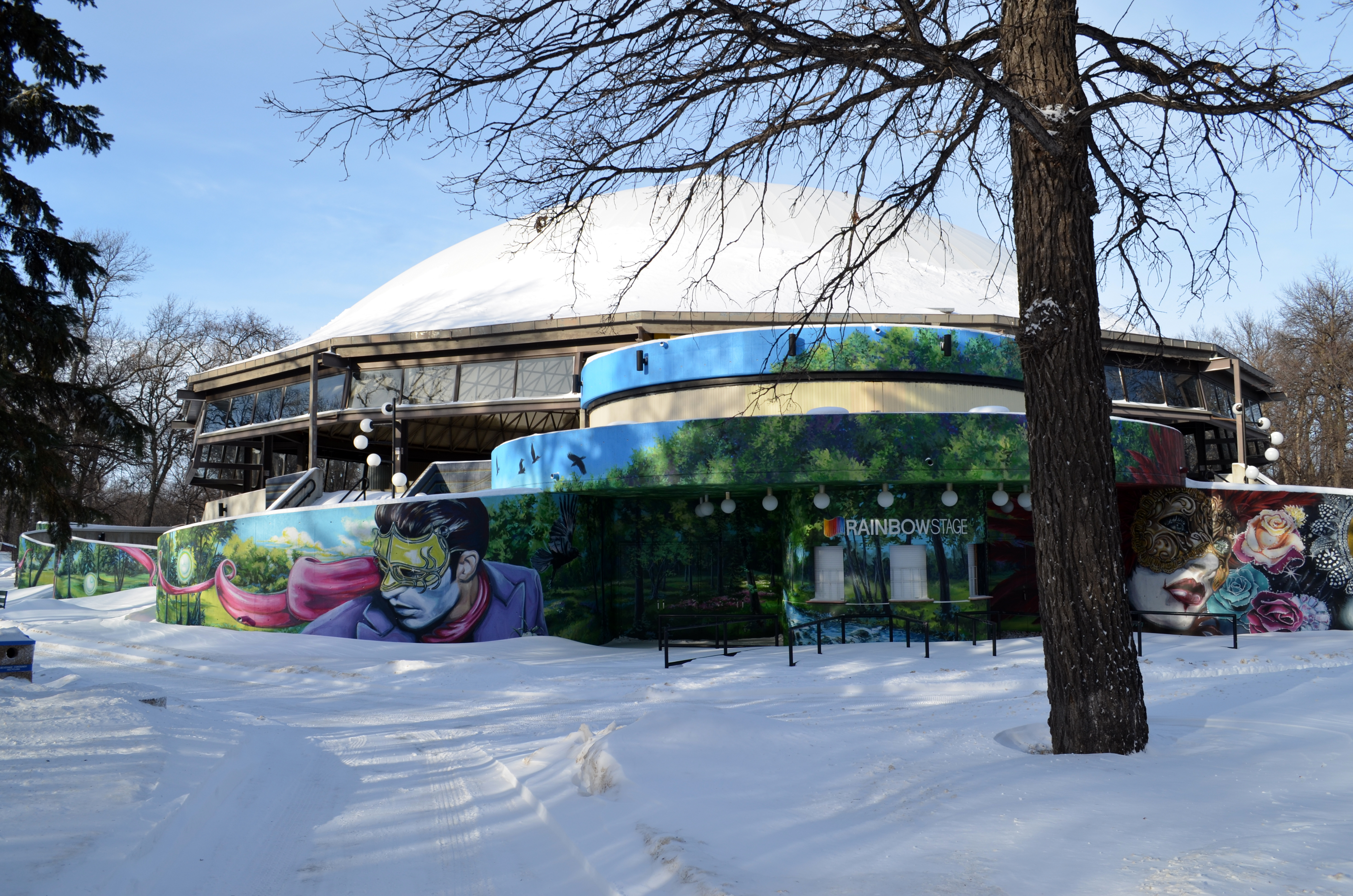
Rainbow Stage

Rainbow Stage is Canada's longest-surviving outdoor theatre. The covered, open-air theatre seats 2,600 people.

=== Outdoor pool and splash pad ===
Kildonan Pool is a 50-by-23-metre (165-by-75-foot) outdoor Olympic-size swimming pool. Construction was completed in May 1966, and the pool opened on July 20, 1966.

The facility underwent a $3-million upgrade in 2010. A splash pad, water slide and beach-style shallow-entry area were added, and the upgraded pool reopened in August of that year.

During planning for the 1967 Pan Am Games, organizers considered building two outdoor pools for swimming and diving events, one in Assiniboine Park and one in Kildonan Park. The proposal was later dropped. At the recommendation of metropolitan councillor Jack Willis, an indoor facility, Pan Am Pool, was built instead and hosted the Games’ aquatic events.

=== Peguis Pavilion ===
A few years after Kildonan Park opened, the first pavilion was opened in 1915 and cost C$13,000 to construct. It was demolished in 1964 to make way for the second pavilion.

Designed by architectural firm Blankstein Coop Gillmor and Hanna (now Number Ten), the Peguis Pavilion (originally called the Kildonan Park Pavilion) building was built in the 1960s and officially opened in 1966 with a budget of $125,000. It is near Lord Selkirk Creek, which was dammed. The architectural firm chosen for the Pavilion project was Blankstein Coop Gilmor Hanna.

In 2012, the pavilion underwent $2 million in renovations, including new heating and air conditioning, public washrooms on the main floor and basement, a new family washroom, a new elevator, refurbished kitchen and restaurant — Prairie's Edge Restaurant, and a new roof. In spring 2013, landscaping around the pavilion was completed, including pond renovations.

=== Witch's Hut ===
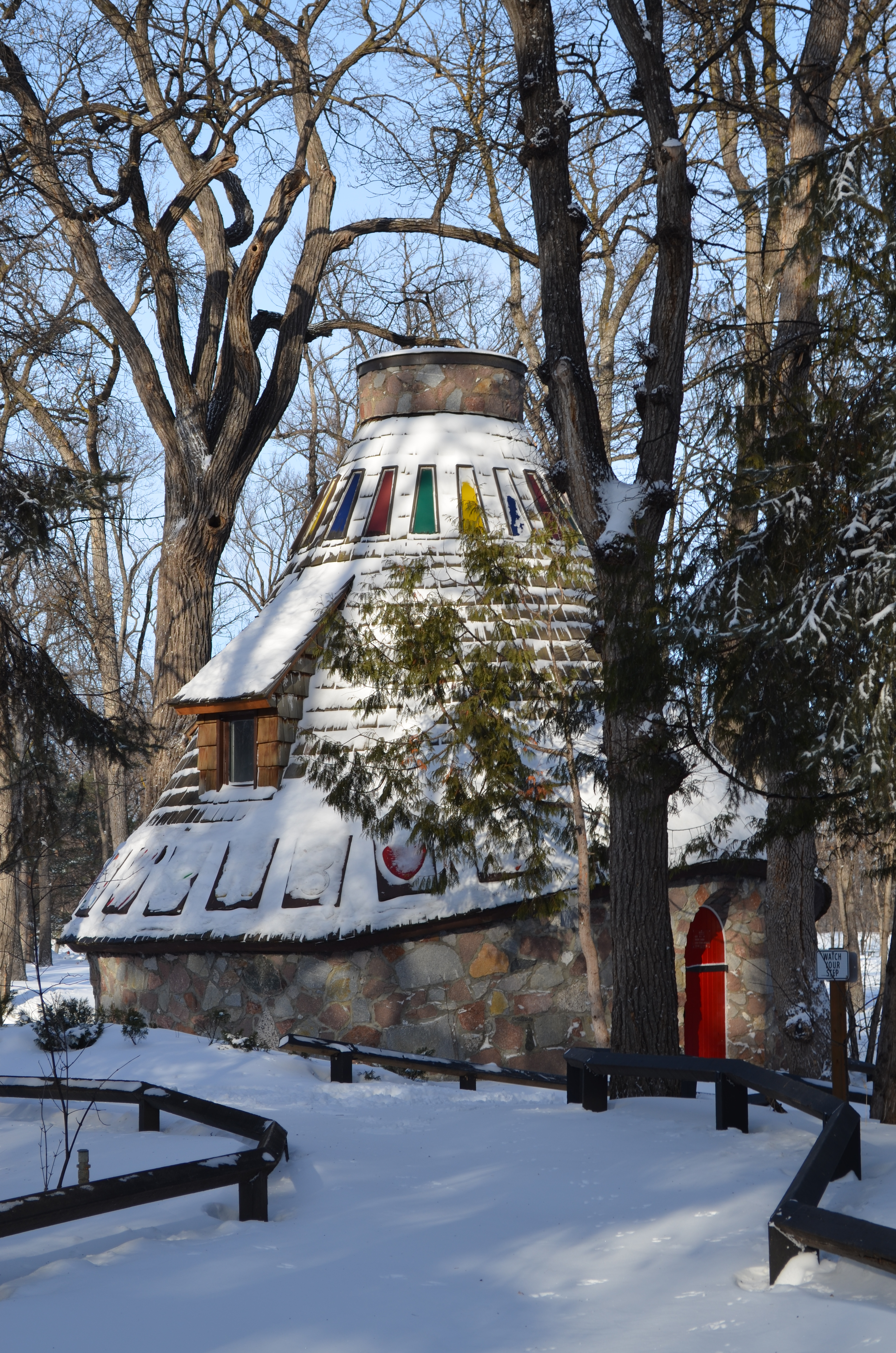
Witch's Hut

The Witch's Hut is a small building designed to illustrate the Brothers Grimm fairy tale Hansel and Gretel.

Dedicated and opened in October 1970, the Witch's Hut was a Centennial Project of the German Community of Manitoba and a gift to the children of the Province. Also known as das Hexenhaus, the hut was designed by Manitoba architect Hans Peter Langes. The hut contains relief terracotta panels depicting the fairy tale in sequential scenes, along with full scale images of Hansel, Gretel and the witch.

=== Public art ===
Bokeh, an artwork created by Takashi Iwasaki and Nadi Design was installed around the duck pond in 2018. Bokeh lights the skating area in the dark of winter.. Bokeh is a Japanese word for blurriness.
