= Canadian Grain Commission =

Canadian government agency

Coordinates: 49°53′38.5″N 97°08′13″W

- Commission canadienne des grains
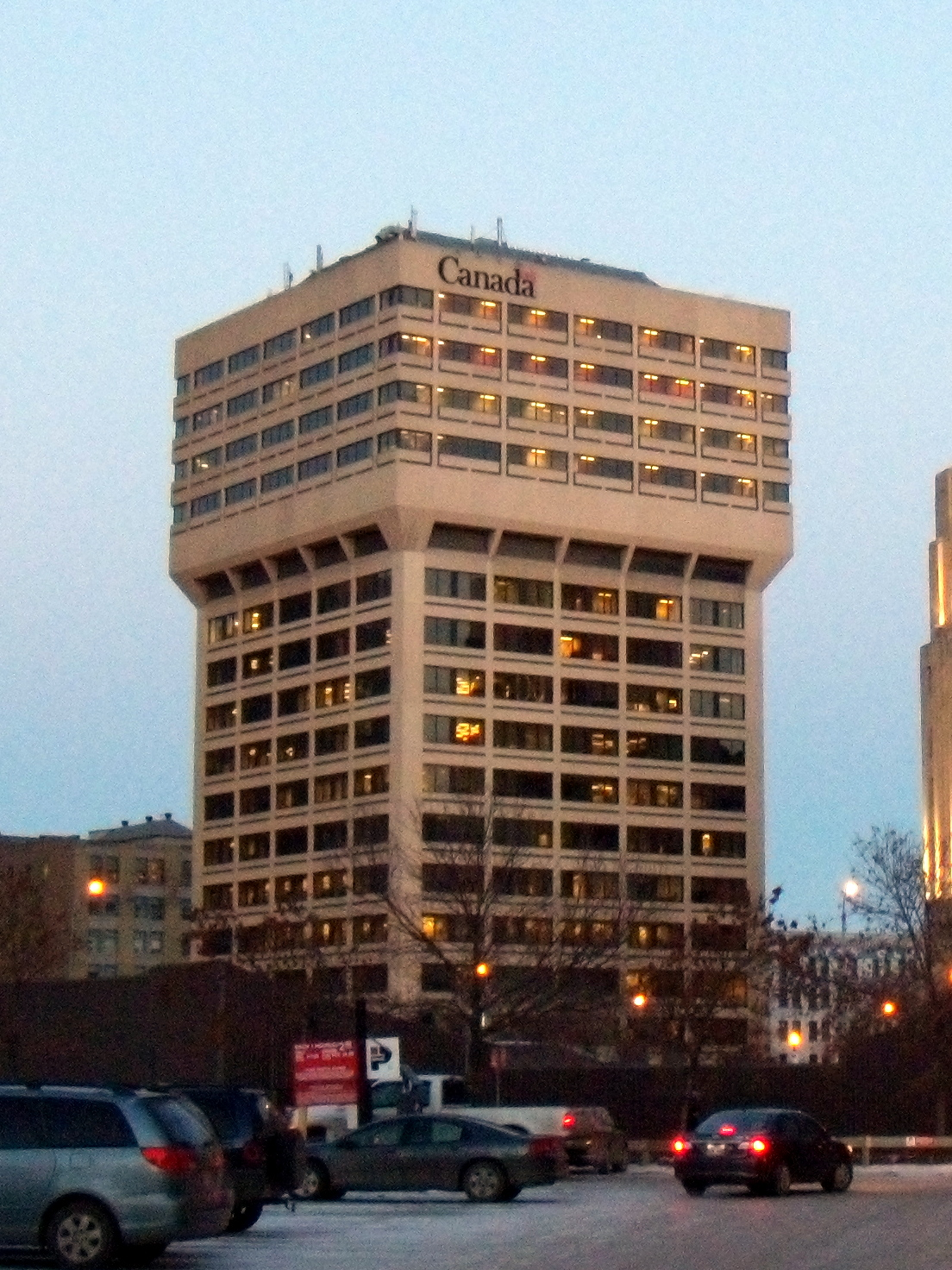
- CGC building at 303 Main Street in Winnipeg

Agency overview
- Formed: 1912; 114 years ago
- Preceding agency: Board of Grain Commissioners for Canada
- Jurisdiction: Government of Canada
- Headquarters: 303 Main St., Winnipeg, Manitoba
- Minister responsible: Heath MacDonald, Minister of Agriculture and Agri-Food
- Agency executives: David Hunt, Chief Commissioner; Jon Friesen, COO
- Key document: Canada Grain Act (R.S.C. 1985, c. G-10)
- Website: https://grainscanada.gc.ca

The Canadian Grain Commission (CGC; French: Commission canadienne des grains) is an agency of the Canadian government responsible for regulation of the grain-handling industry in Canada, as well as to protect producers' rights and ensure the integrity of grain transactions.

== Overview ==
The Minister of Agriculture and Agri-Food is responsible for the Canadian Grain Commission. The Commission is governed by the Canada Grain Act (R.S.C. 1985, c. G-10), which provides for the appointment of three commissioners by the federal cabinet, one of whom is named chief commissioner. The CGC is headed by a Chief Operating Officer (COO), who reports to the chief commissioner.

Its headquarters are located in Winnipeg, Manitoba. As of 2013, the commission has two regional offices which provide a full range of inspection, weighing, analytical, and entomology services, namely, Montreal and Vancouver.

The function of the CGC is, among other things, to

- establish and maintain standards of quality for Canadian grain and regulate grain handling in Canada, to ensure a dependable commodity for domestic and export markets.
- recommend and establish grain grades and standards for those grades and implement a system of grading and inspection for Canadian grain to reflect adequately the quality of that grain and meet the need for efficient marketing in and outside Canada

== History ==
In 1971, the Canadian Grain Commission replaced the Board of Grain Commissioners for Canada, which was created in 1912 by the Conservative government of Robert Borden. Even then it was colloquially known as the "Canadian grain commission".

The 1912 legislation provided "that all owners and operators of elevators, warehouses and mills and certain traders in grain, shall be licensed; for supervision of the handling and storage of grain in and out of elevators, etc.; and prohibits persons operating or interested in a terminal elevator from buying or selling grain. It contains, also, provisions for inspection and grading."

In 1922, the Davies Court ruled that the criminal provisions of the CGA fell without the ambit of the "in any case whatever" section 36 provisions of the Supreme Court Act of 1906, and that therefore the legislators could and did draw up a statute which limited the power of the Supreme Court of Canada (SCC). The defendant, a Manitoba elevator, was convicted for selling grain on commission without a licence, in contravention of section 215 of the Canada Grain Act of 1912. His conviction was quashed by the Court of Appeal, which held section 215 of the Grain Act to be ultra vires of the Dominion Parliament, and the prosecution was handcuffed by the concurrence of highest court.

In 1925, the power of the Federal government to enact a tax policy whereby 'if at the end of any crop year in any terminal elevator "the total surplus of grain is found in excess of one-quarter of one per cent of the gross amount of the grain received in the elevator during the crop year" such surplus shall be sold for the benefit of the Board' was denied by the Anglin Court of the SCC. They ruled that the federal government had encroached into provincial jurisdiction.

In 1971 and in the era of the Canadian Wheat Board (CWB), the power of the federal government to declare a private grain elevator works constructed after the passage of the legislation as "works for the general advantage of Canada", thus gathering them under its control under section 92.10.c of the BNA Act, was contested in the Supreme Court. The Fauteux court ruled it be intra vires.

In 1975, a private rapeseed elevator was declared by the Laskin court to be a "grain elevator" and thus under the control of the CGC and CWB.

In 1980, the defendant corporation in a case of illicentious sale of grain contended in front of the Laskin court that its employee, the manager of a grain elevator, could not be compelled to testify against it by virtue of an extension of the right to silence. It failed and a trial de novo was ordered. The court held, grosso modo, that the employee was not bound to the body corporate to such an extent, and the doctrines about self-incrimination did not apply.

== Building ==
Canadian Grain Commission Building
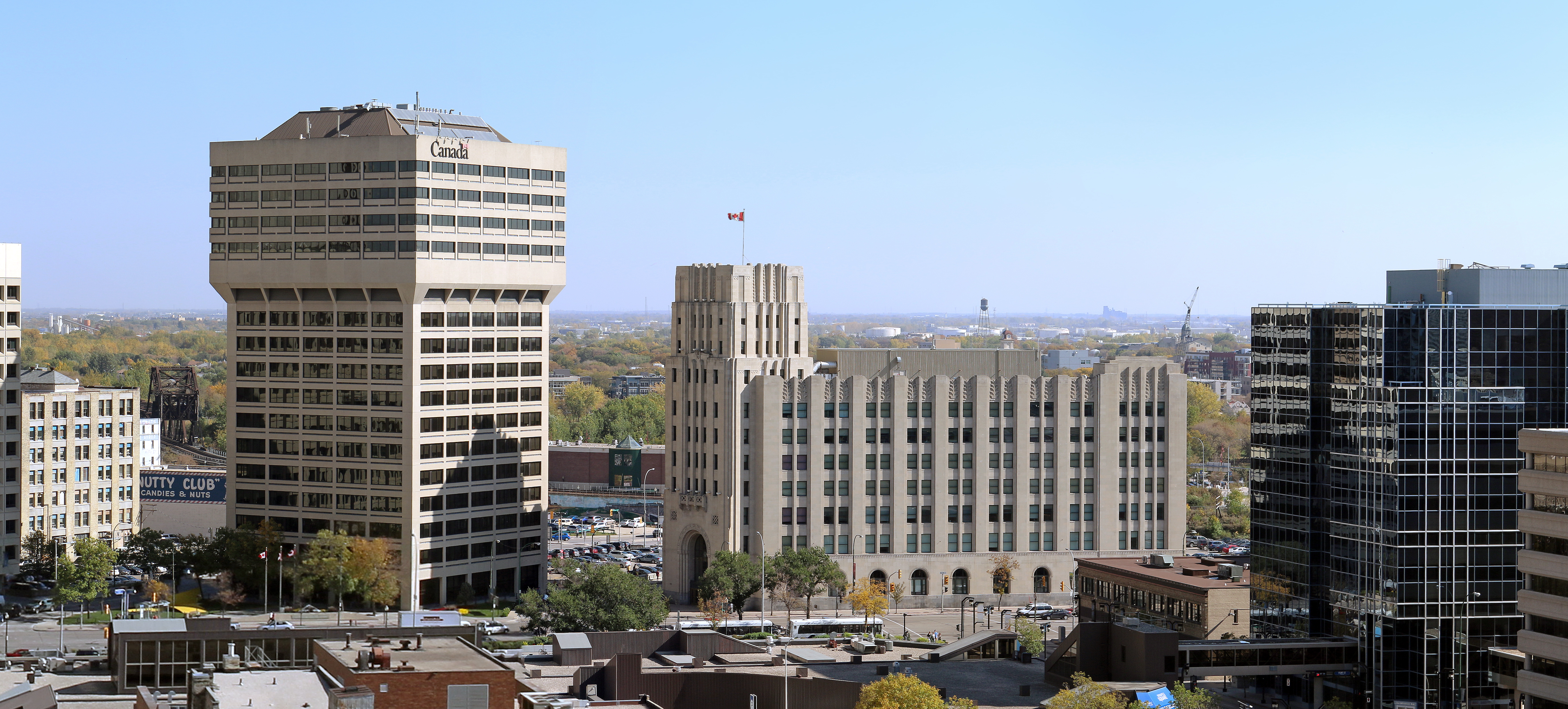
- Grain Commission building, No. 1 Northern visible in the forecourt

General information
- Architectural style: Modernist
- Location: Winnipeg, Manitoba
- Opened: 1972
- Owner: Government of Canada

Design and construction
- Architect: Ernest J. Smith

=== Architecture ===
Ernest J. Smith of Smith Carter was the principal architect of the Grain Commission's current headquarters, nicknamed the "mushroom building", the structure itself is a notable example of a Canadian skyscraper displaying Brutalist elements. The building's "extended cap" was designed because of a space needed between the upper and lower floors for specialized mechanical equipment used to transport grain to an upper-level flour mill and test brewery. Smith remarked on the challenges involved:

Mixing two different functions in a vertical building is difficult. Normally construction would be separated horizontally. In this case, we worked out two separate modules for offices and lab space, [and] found we needed greater depth in the lab and rationalised the present form.

=== Sculpture in the forecourt ===
In 1976, John Cullen Nugent's No. 1 Northern, a large steel abstract sculpture was unveiled, a work intended to be a metaphor for fields of wheat, represented in multi-layer rectangular shapes and painted the "brilliant" yellow of harvest wheat, and designed to represent Canada's hardy top grade, red spring wheat hybrid of the same name. The work was so disliked by some officials, employees of the Commission, the press, and the public, that it was removed in 1978 over the artist's objections and attempts at litigation. In 1997, after a second installation and removal from another federal building in Winnipeg, Nugent's sculpture was reinstalled in front of the Grain Commission building.
