= Hymn Sing =

Television series

- Country of origin: Canada
- No. of seasons: 30

Production
- Running time: 30 minutes

Original release
- Network: CBC Television
- Release: October 3, 1965 – May 1995

Hymn Sing is a Canadian television program taped in Winnipeg, Manitoba, for CBC Television. The program featured hymns, spirituals and inspirational music sung by a sixteen member choir. The series was broadcast nationally on Sunday afternoons from October 3, 1965 to May 1995.

The show's musical directors were Eric Wild (from 1965 to 1978) and Winnifred Sim (1978–1995).

== Reception ==
Hymn Sing was originally scheduled for a 13-week run, but due to overwhelming popularity, it grew into a 30-year series. Hymn Sing was viewed by more than 3 million Canadians per week, and at times, had better ratings that Hockey Night in Canada. Hymn Sing eventually became CBC's second longest running show, after Front Page Challenge. Performers recount receiving fan mail and gifts from viewers.

== Reunion ==
Hymn Sing alumni hosted a three-day reunion event in August 2018 in Winnipeg. The event ended with a 90 minute celebratory concert at Bethel Mennonite Church, which featured over 70 former Hymn Sing performers. John Nelson, a show performer from 1968 to 1974, said of the event "This is a once-in-a-lifetime experience, as many of us are now in our 60s, or even mid-70s, it's also our opportunity to thank our fans, and bring a sense of closure… that we never really had until now." The concert paid homage to various important members of the Hymn Sing team, including musical director Winnifred Sim and pianist Mitch Parks.
