= No. 1 Northern =

Abstract steel sculpture by John Cullen Nugent

- Artist: John Cullen Nugent
- Year: 1976
- Medium: Steel
- Subject: Spring wheat
- Dimensions: 2.4 m × 7.3 m × 13 m (8 ft × 24 ft × 43 ft)
- Location: Winnipeg, Manitoba, Canada; 49.89429°N 97.13731°W

No. 1 Northern is a large public art work in the form of a steel abstract sculpture by John Cullen Nugent, currently standing where it was originally installed in the fore court of the Canadian Grain Commission building in Winnipeg, in 1976. The work generated controversy from the moment it was unveiled, and even after its removal by ministerial order in 1978. In 1979, Meriké Wiler called it the most controversial piece of Canadian public art ever commissioned during the fourteen years of Canada's public art funding scheme. It was hauled away and cut into pieces on two occasions, before and after being installed in front of another federal government building, and finally reinstalled at its intended location once more in 1997, nearly twenty years after its removal.

== Inspiration ==
Nugent's inspiration was the fields of ripe golden wheat stretching across the rolling prairie. The sculpture is a metaphor for those wheat fields.

— No. 1 Northern site plaque

No. 1 Northern was intended to be a metaphor for fields of wheat, represented in multi-layer rectangular shapes and painted the "brilliant" yellow of harvest wheat, representing Canada's hardy top grade, red spring wheat hybrid of the same name that dominates the prairies in the fall.

== History ==
A beautiful piece with a sad story.

— Robert Epp
Curator, Gallery 111, University of Manitoba

The ghosts of the past will haunt it until doomsday... I went there with joy in my heart and got slammed in the teeth.

— John Nugent

=== Commission ===
During the 1960s and 1970s, the Canadian government acted regularly as a patron of the arts, and the Department of Public Works had a fine art program in which 1% of the construction costs for federal buildings open to the public would be spent on commissioning art. Architectural firm Smith Carter had recently designed and built the new Canadian Grain Commission building, and recommended that it be bestowed with a large scale exterior sculpture, but no art allowance had been designated in the construction budget, and in June 1972 the firm notified the Department of Public Works. The Western Region Office responded that there were no funds available for art.

In April 1973, Ernest J. Smith, the building's principal architect, met with Regional Committee member Kenneth Lochhead and they "mutually agreed" that the building required a major contemporary work of art for the fore court, determining a budget of $50,000, with Smith to follow up with a list of artists (the Regional Office had not changed its position). In June 1974, with no funds forthcoming, Smith suggested the Commission might rent a work of art from the Art Bank, but its advisory committee members disagreed: after ten years, the rental fees would exceed the value of the art. The following July, a competition was proposed between ten invited artists, with each to receive $500 for their maquette (scale model) and travel expenses.

In January 1975, Nugent and four other artists, Henry Saxe, Ulysse Comtois, Ricardo Gomez, and Hugh Leroy, were chosen by Smith (with Kenneth Lochhead's advice). Public Works Headquarters determined that the funds would come from the Western Region's Accommodation Capital. The Advisory Committee selected Nugent's work.

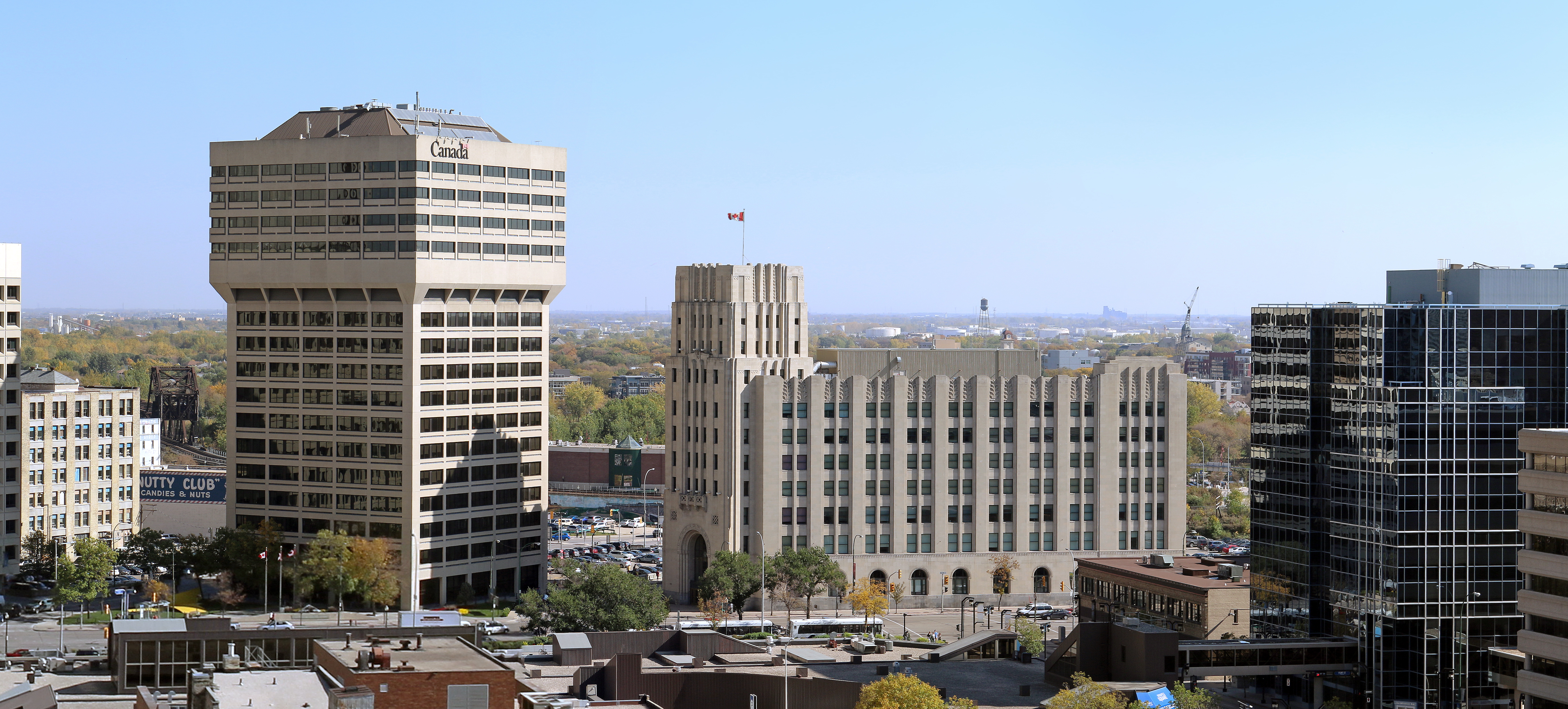
No. 1 Northern standing below the Grain Commission building.

=== Installation and reception ===
Earl Baxter, chairman of the Board of Grain Commissioners, attended the meeting at which Nugent's proposal was selected and expressed reservations about its design. Over his objections, the work was installed in late 1975. Baxter continued to complain, applying to officials as far up in the chain of command as Public Works Minister C.M. Drury, but finding himself ignored, canvassed employees, and shortly after the work's 1976 unveiling, obtained 300 signatures signed in protest (a dozen employees liked it). Before the official unveiling, then Agriculture Minister Eugene Whelan called the work "a waste of taxpayers' moneys." Margarite Pinney, then chief of the fine arts program for Public Works, said Whelan was criticizing a piece of art work he had never seen: "We have been trying for some time to get a piece of sculpture for a federal building in western Canada and on the eve of an unveiling we have unfair comments from the minister". Winnipeg Tribune columnist Vic Grant said it should be plowed under and left to decompose, while others "went from there, proposing that its creator... be plowed under with it." According to the federal government's Cultural Property Inventory, in addition to complaints from employees and the general public that the work was "ugly and meaningless", there were also "charges that the piece was dangerous in the winter because someone might walk into it and injure themselves." Catherine Anderson-Dolcini believes that many people were either unaware of what the work represented, or else resented representation of the wheat in abstract form, and that much anger, stemmed from a lack of public involvement during the selection process.

The controversy continued for eighteen months. Mayo Graham of the Public Works Capital Region Advisory Committee felt that "both the sculpture and its location" were fine, but was not happy with what he called the "bus 'hut,' bench, and surrounding planting", as he wrote in a letter to Bob Osler, Acting Chief of Environmental Design, dated 9 August 1977:

Frankly, I think that we should care enough about the sculpture to highlight it... rather than try to hide or detract from it with these other unattractive elements. I hope there is still the possibility of convincing those in charge to keep the Nugent sculpture in place.

Contemporary work seems naturally to draw hostility, but I feel that this work deserves complete support.

— Mayo Graham

=== Removals and re-installations ===
Whelan panned me, the press panned me, people in the building panned me... I was lucky to get out of Winnipeg alive.

— John Nugent

For 20 years, we banished John Nugent's graceful No. 1 Northern steel wheatfield sculpture because of the tastes of a few cranky taxpayers.

— Morley Walker (arts critic for the Winnipeg Free Press)

By July 1978, Baxter had prevailed: local Public Works officials were fed up with the controversy, and with the blessing of the new Public Works Minister Judd Buchanan, announced that No. 1 Northern would be "cut in pieces" and moved "somewhere" on 1 August. Nugent heard about this while working at his studio in Lumsden, Saskatchewan and a legal standoff began. Canadian Artists Representation filed an action to stop the removal of Nugent's work; the sculptor was given one month to choose between two sites, though he felt that neither one was suitable. Accounts of what happened next vary; there were rumours that "it simply disappeared one night and no one claimed to know who was responsible." Late in the night of 31 August, against the protestations of Nugent's lawyer, officials dismantled the work (possibly while legal proceedings were ongoing) when it was cut up and taken to a federal warehouse in Lockport. Nugent said afterwards: "They can decide what to do with it now... It seems futile to sue." But sue Nugent did, for "damages to the artist's reputation", as well as breach of contract.

Two years later, No. 1 Northern was reinstalled in front of a Revenue Canada building, the Winnipeg Taxation Centre on Stapon Road. Upset that his work had not been supported the first time around, Nugent said he was not interested in the re-installation, and that since the sculpture had been cut into pieces and reassembled "it wasn't his original work anymore." "I've disowned it... The minute the government vandalized it I disowned it."

In 1993, the work was quietly moved a second time, this time to a Winnipeg scrapyard in the salvage area, "in pieces", unbeknownst to Nugent, who asked for the public's help in finding the piece. A Public Works spokesperson later said it was moved because new pathways into the building passed too near the sculpture and the department was concerned "children might climb on it". In Spring 1997, Nugent discovered what had become of his work and complained, along with many other artists, about the way Public Works stored pieces of art it owned. The department made a commitment to restoring the sculpture and finding a prominent, public setting for it following public reaction to news of its deterioration.

Later the same year, almost twenty years after it was removed, No. 1 Northern was reinstalled in front of the Grain Commission building. Another two decades later, Di Brandt, Winnipeg's first poet laureate, suggested that as the Winnipeg Arts Council's contemporary public art program has developed, Nugent's work no longer seems risqué: "It brightens up the grey streets, and provides a nice horizontal homage to our Prairie landscape and agricultural heritage among all those tall vertical buildings."
