= Dennis H. Carter =

Canadian architect

Dennis Carter FRAIC OAA
- Born: 9 October 1920; Montreal, Quebec, Canada
- Died: 21 June 2012 (aged 91); Winnipeg, Manitoba, Canada
- Education: University of Manitoba
- Occupation: Architect
- Spouse: Barbara Carter
- Children: Richard • Shelagh
- Parents: George Carter; Edith Carter
- Awards: RAIC Gold Medal
- Buildings: Rainbow Stage; Hamber Hall; Rae & Jerry's; Monarch Life Building; Richardson Building; Carter Residence

Dennis H. Carter was a Canadian architect and amateur filmmaker.

Both he and his partner Ernest Smith, with whom he founded Smith Carter, were, according to Jeffrey Thorsteinson, among several "significant modern architects" who graduated from the University of Manitoba's architecture program prior to 1946, and who were "vital to the rise of a notable regional strain of Canadian architecture" referred to as Manitoba modernism.

== Death ==
Dennis Carter died on 21 June 2012 at the Deer Lodge Centre, predeceased by Barbara and his brother Leslie.

== Professional affiliations ==
- Royal Architectural Institute of Canada • Fellow (1963)
- Manitoba Association of Architects • President (1966–67) • Life Member (2000)

== Select publications ==
- "Project for a recreation centre." Royal Architectural Institute of Canada Journal 22 (4) (April 1945): 80.
