= John Cullen Nugent =

Canadian artist (1921–2014)

John Cullen Nugent RCA
- Born: 5 January 1921; Montreal
- Died: 12 March 2014 (aged 93); Lumsden, Saskatchewan
- Education: Saint John's University
- Known for: liturgical and public sculpture, photography
- Notable work: Louis Riel Memorial; No. 1 Northern
- Spouse: Florence Keller

John Cullen Nugent RCA (1921-2014) was a Canadian artist and educator known primarily for his public art works, often in the form of abstract sculpture.

== Early life and education ==
Born and raised in Montreal on 5 January 1921, the young Nugent attended high school in St. Paul, Minnesota before returning to Canada prior to the Second World War and joining the Royal Canadian Mounted Police, training at Regina and Ottawa. Three years later, Nugent joined the Canadian Army, serving in the provost corps in the 1940s.

Following the war, Nugent was discharged and studied art at St John's University (Collegeville, Minnesota), where he was exposed to liberal ideals and the postwar Catholic renewal in the arts. There, he was apprenticed in sculpture and silversmith work with Donald Humphrey, and later obtained additional training after moving to Lumsden, Saskatchewan in 1947.

Nugent attended the Emma Lake Artists' Workshops in the 1950s and 1960s, studying with Jack Shadbolt, Joseph Plaskett, Will Barnet, and Clement Greenberg.

== Career in the arts ==
=== Religious works and candle making ===
In Lumsden, Nugent established his first studio (formerly a barn) and bronze casting foundry on a 2.7-hectare parcel of land that forms the north slope of the Qu’Appelle Valley. He received numerous commissions in the decades following, initially producing religious sculptures in silver and bronze (liturgical commissions, including chalices and candleholders) while supporting his family as a chandler. According to Timothy Long, these works were "simplified, yet expressive": chalices and crucifixes which demonstrated Nugent's interest in modern interpretations of early Christian and Romanesque models. Candle making was a lucrative sideline, Nugent being the only maker west of Windsor, Ontario. The Shop's wick material was specially woven from beeswax bought from the beekeepers co-operative processing plant at Tisdale and treated with a solution, the ingredients of which were a trade secret taught to him by L. H. Shirley, a Roman Catholic priest in Young, Saskatchewan.

=== New studio ===
In 1960, Nugent's candle works in Lumsden burned down. Nugent commissioned Clifford Wiens to design a new studio with a novel curved, conical design that earned the architect a Massey silver medal. The studio was constructed over successive weekends by Nugent and Wiens, with help from fellow artists Kenneth Lochhead and Roy Kiyooka. The studio has been a Provincial Heritage Property since 26 May 2005, the 42nd site so designated, and listed at the online Canadian Register of Historic Places.

=== Turn to abstract sculpture ===
Resistance from the Church hierarchy and from parishioners led to Nugent abandoning his liturgical work in the 1960s. After meeting American sculptor David Smith in New York in 1961, Nugent was in any case gradually shifting to welded steel abstracts, for which he is now best known, and which exhibit what Long calls "an awkward grace" in its constructivist collage of prefabricated steel elements. He acquired some of the raw materials from the IPSCO Steel steel company in Regina, and often gave the pieces names "to eliminate distraction from the form itself". Long describes how Nugent's work differentiates itself from that of others:

While often incorporating identifiable parts, such as wheels, his sculpture eludes easy metaphorical readings, instead creating meaning through unexpected combinations of forms and materials. Nugent's work represents an independent strain within Canadian abstract steel sculpture without direct ties to the Emma Lake Artists' Workshops or other western Canadian sculptors.

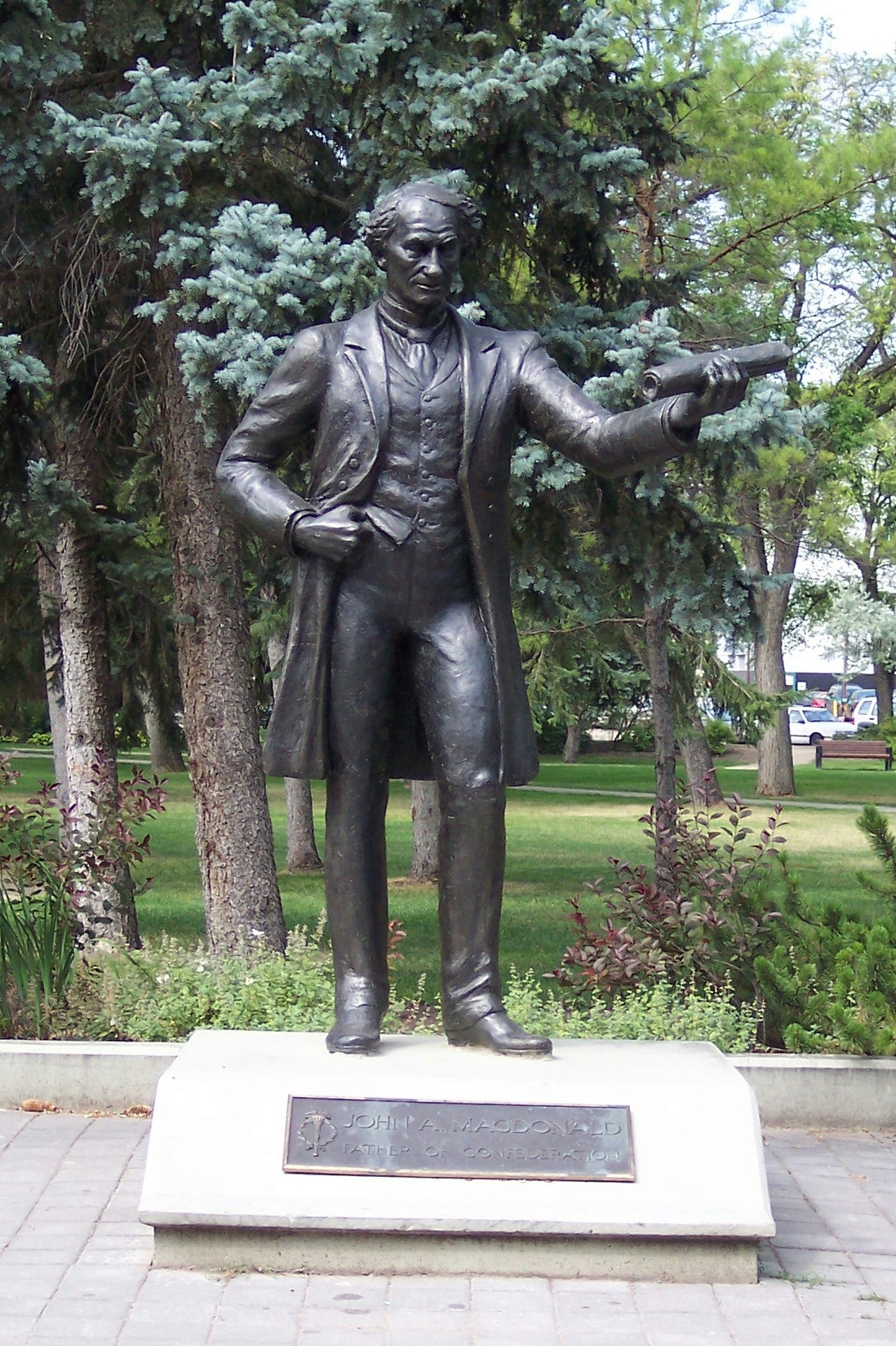
Nugent's John A. Macdonald Memorial in Victoria Park. It has since been removed.

=== Public sculptural works ===
Nugent's best known public sculptures are found in the three Prairie Provinces of Canada, including commissions for places such as the Banff Centre in Regina, Saskatchewan and the Canadian Grain Commission building in Winnipeg. There is a piece in the galleria of the CBC Saskatchewan building in Regina. Another public commission is at the National Capital Commission in Ottawa. More of his work can be found in the collections of the MacKenzie Art Gallery, the Robert McLaughlin Gallery (Oshawa), the Saskatchewan Arts Board, the University of Regina, and the Winnipeg Art Gallery.

On occasion, controversy was induced by Nugent's work, including commissions by Saskatchewan Premier Ross Thatcher and the Canadian Grain Commission.

==== John A. Macdonald Memorial (1967) ====
Local fundraising for a statue in Regina to commemorate the first Prime Minister of Canada began in 1891, though the work did not begin until 1966 after Sonia de Grandmaison was commissioned to do the work. Her statue of John A. Macdonald was cast by Nugent using the "lost wax technique" he learned along with candlemaking, in five pieces, which were then soldered together.

After Macdonald's role in the Canadian Indian residential school system and other dealings became common knowledge in the 2010s, there were calls to remove the statue from its location in Victoria Park. After vandalism and protests at the memorial, the statue was removed in April 2021 and placed into storage.

==== Louis Riel Memorial (1968) ====
Riel has significance for people now, and I felt he had to be expressed in contemporary terms.

— John Nugent

In the lead-up to the Canadian Centennial in 1967, the Saskatchewan Arts Board recommended that the province should have a new public sculpture. To this end, a competition was announced. Nugent proposed an abstract monument of Métis leader Louis Riel in the form of an abstract design in three parts: "two large plates of steel and a single spike between them", which Will Chabun suggested could be easily understood as "two hands reaching out and one other element reaching out to the sky." According to Timothy Long, head curator of the MacKenzie Art Gallery, Nugent's idea was to represent an as yet unrealized inspiration. Nugent's proposal won the competition, but Premier Ross Thatcher stepped in and made clear his preference for a realistic depiction. A provincial cabinet meeting followed which included Nugent, representatives from the Board and the University of Saskatchewan, and Art McKay. All were convinced of the proposal's merit but Premier Thatcher, and he was the only one whose opinion counted.

Nugent later said he wanted to refuse but he needed the money. He agreed to design a sculpture of Riel "striding forward", arm raised and pointing upward, maintaining in some way the essence of the original idea. Nugent's final submission was of this "heroic" figure of Riel, which the artist sculpted as a nude. Objections were again raised, and Nugent was made to add some form of clothing. He created a "cape or vest" made from wax-coated burlap and wrapped it around the statue's body, covering the genitalia, though not entirely. The statue was unveiled in 1968, near the legislative building.

As for those whom Riel originally represented, the Métis community, no one was ever consulted by anyone involved in the project at any stage, and as time passed mounting pressure came from the Métis who requested the work be removed from the legislative grounds. The defunct ArtsSask.ca website noted their criticisms:

John Nugent was not of Metis descent and many people in the Metis community were upset because they had no input in the design. Many also found the sculpture of Riel offensive and were glad to see the memorial removed after it had stood in Wascana Park in Regina for 23 years.

In 1991, the sculpture was removed and relocated to the MacKenzie Art Gallery vault, along with Nugent's original abstract maquette, where it remains.

==== No. 1 Northern (1976) ====
This large steel abstract sculpture is intended as a metaphor for fields of wheat, represented in multi-layer rectangular shapes and painted the "brilliant" yellow of harvest wheat, designed to represent Canada's hardy top grade, red spring wheat hybrid of the same name that dominate the Prairies in the fall. The work was commissioned following a process begun as a recommendation by the architectural firm Smith Carter that the recently built Canadian Grain Commission building should be bestowed with a large scale exterior sculpture. Against the objections of Earl Baxter, chairman of the Board of Grain Commissioners, the work was installed in late 1975. Baxter canvassed employees, obtaining 300 signatures in protest shortly after the work's 1976 unveiling. The federal government's Cultural Property Inventory cites complaints from employees and the general public that the work was "ugly and meaningless", and "charges that the piece was dangerous in the winter because someone might walk into it and injure themselves." The Agriculture Minister Eugene Whelan called the work "a waste of taxpayers' moneys."

Whelan panned me, the press panned me, people in the building panned me... I was lucky to get out of Winnipeg alive.

— John Nugent

By July 1978, Baxter had prevailed. It was reinstalled two years later in front of a Revenue Canada building, the Winnipeg Taxation Centre on Stapon Road. At the time, Nugent said he was not interested in the re-installation, upset that his work had not been supported the first time around and since the sculpture was cut into three "it wasn't his original work anymore."

In 1993, the work was quietly moved a second time, this time to a Winnipeg scrapyard in the salvage area, "in pieces", unbeknownst to Nugent, who asked for the public's help in finding the piece. A Public Works spokesperson later said it was because new pathways into the building passed too near the sculpture and the department was concerned "children might climb on it". In Spring 1997, Nugent discovered what had become of his work had and complained, with many other artists, about the way Public Works stored pieces of art it owned. The department made a commitment to restoring the sculpture and finding a prominent, public setting for it following public reaction to news of its deterioration. Later the same year, almost twenty years after it was removed, No. 1 Northern was reinstalled in front of the Grain Commission building.

==== Tolsop (1977) ====
Interested in the three-dimensional forms possible by arranging pieces of surplus steel found at the IPSCO site, Nugent welded a piece that has a very different character when viewed from different angles: while a large convex disc dominates all views, its positioning at 45 degrees "invites the viewer to consider it from other vantage points," so that what initially appears to be a large solid, "flattish" and angled piece "morphs into an airier version" with vertical and horizontal elements of smaller proportions. The title, an invented term, was suggested to him by the final form of the sculpture, which originally sat as one of the many strewn about his studio, the uncoated welded steel gaining a patina of characteristics of the material itself.

Tolsop is now located outside the main entrance to the Dr. William Riddell Centre of the University of Regina.

==== Tahiti (1981) ====
Welded steel shapes of different sizes and lengths, the central piece a trapezoid suggestive of a hammock, located at the Confederation Centre Plaza in Charlottetown, Prince Edward Island.

=== Retrospective exhibition and photography ===
In 1983, Nugent's work was the subject of a major retrospective, John Nugent: Modernism in Isolation, organized by the MacKenzie Art Gallery in Regina. In the 1990s, his interests turned to photography. Nugent's photography, like his sculpture, was widely collected in Saskatchewan and beyond.

=== Related pursuits ===
Nugent taught at the University of Regina from 1970 to 1985.

== Professional affiliations ==
Nugent was a member of the Royal Canadian Academy of Arts.

== Personal life ==
John Nugent married Florence Keller, and they had five children: a son, David, and four daughters, Valerie, Pamela, Patricia and Karen. At the time of his death he had thirteen grandchildren.

Nugent died on 12 March 2014, predeceased by his wife, Florence, son, David, grandson, Chad, and great-grandson, Caden. Nugent, his wife, and son are all buried in Lumsden.
