= Ed Evanko =

Canadian opera singer

- Born: Edward Danylo Evanko; October 19, 1941; Winnipeg, Manitoba, Canada
- Died: November 18, 2018 (aged 77); Winnipeg, Manitoba, Canada
- Education: University of Manitoba
- Occupations: Ukrainian Catholic priest, formerly an actor and singer

Edward Danylo Evanko (October 19, 1941 – November 18, 2018) was a Canadian actor and singer who became a Ukrainian Catholic priest. He was born and died in Winnipeg.

== Biography ==
=== Early life ===
Evanko was born in Winnipeg, Manitoba, to Danylo Evanko and Justyna Dmytryk, who had emigrated from Western Ukraine. At an early age, he showed a special talent for music, winning the first of many trophies in the Manitoba (Winnipeg) Music Competition Festival at thirteen years of age. He studied with Herbert Belyea and Lucien Needham and sang professionally for the first time at Rainbow Stage. He earned a BA Degree at the University of Manitoba, majoring in English.

In 1961, he began training at the Bristol Old Vic Theatre School and sang with two opera companies in the 1970s - the English Opera Group and the Welsh National Opera. Upon his return to Winnipeg in 1967, he hosted his own “Ed Evanko Show.” He appeared in many evening and daytime television drama including Ryan's Hope, Chicago Hope, and 3rd Rock from the Sun. He appeared on Broadway in Canterbury Tales and Rex.

=== Education and career ===
He earned a Bachelor of Arts at the University of Manitoba, where he was Marc Antony in "Julius Caesar" among other productions, appeared at Rainbow Stage, and on CBC Television and CBC Radio. His Broadway debut gained him a Theatre World Award, a New Jersey Drama Critics Award and a Los Angeles Ovation Award nomination. He recorded Broadway albums for Capitol, RCA, an album for Decca, and three for Destiny Records. He appeared at all the major Ukrainian festivals in Canada and the USA, and promoted Ukrainian music by singing on many occasions at the Ukrainian Institute and at Lincoln Center in New York City. He was also a member of the Stratford Festival company for three seasons in the early 1960s and late 1970s.

=== Rome ===
He did his academic and spiritual formation at the Pontificio Collegio Beda in Rome, at St. Josaphat Ukrainian Catholic Seminary and at The Catholic University of America (both in Washington D.C., and at Holy Spirit Ukrainian Catholic Seminary and St. Paul University in Ottawa. He completed his Master of Arts in Theology degree (Eastern Christian Studies concentration) in the spring of 2005, and began to serve in the Archeparchy of Winnipeg. He entered the priesthood in his sixties and was practicing as a travelling priest in rural Manitoba. He then moved out to the West Coast for a brief spell, before returning to Manitoba.

=== Death ===
On October 21, 2016 he suffered a stroke to which he succumbed on November 18, 2018.
