= Victoria Park, Regina =

Municipal park in Regina, Saskatchewan

Victoria Park
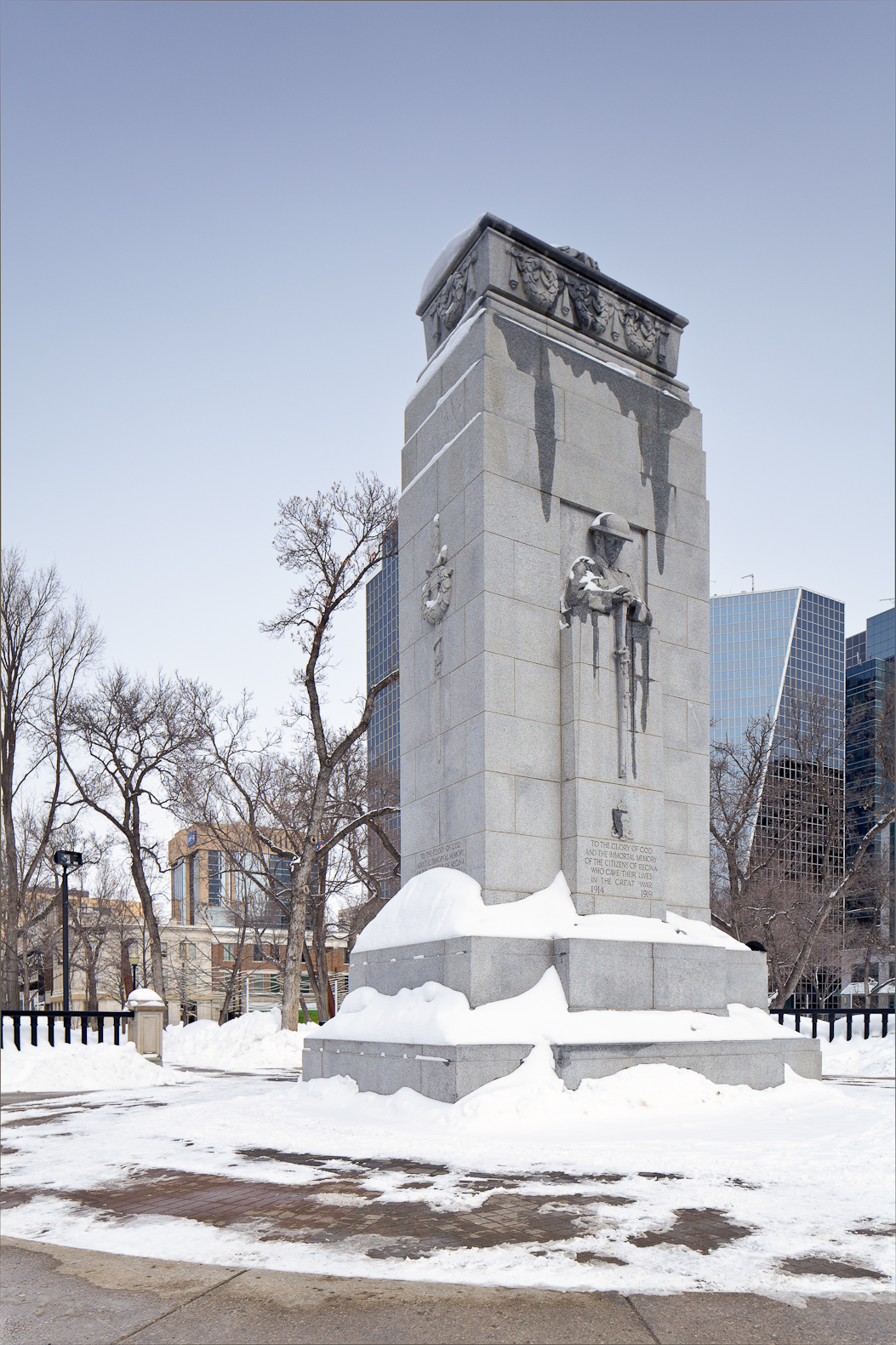
- The Cenotaph located in the centre of Victoria Park
- Interactive map of Victoria Park
- Type: Public park
- Location: Regina, Saskatchewan
- Coordinates: 50°26′52.88″N 104°36′44.18″W
- Area: 2.4 ha (5.9 acres)
- Created: 1907
- Operator: City of Regina
- Status: Open all year

Victoria Park is a public park in the centre of downtown Regina, the capital of the Canadian province of Saskatchewan.

The park is the size of two city blocks, bordered north and south by 12th Avenue and Victoria Avenue, and east and west by Scarth Street and Lorne Street. The centre of the park divides north and southbound Cornwall Street. On the north side of the park is City Square Plaza, a stone paved plaza encompassing part of 12th Avenue and part of the park, used for festivals and the Regina Farmers Market. On the south side of the park is a children's play area in the south-east corner and a memorial of John A. Macdonald (until its removal in 2021) at the south central entrance at Cornwall Street. The north-west corner has small maintenance buildings and the centre of the park is the focal point where the cenotaph is located amidst a raised circular area covered in pavement stone and surrounded by a circular wall.

Originally a treeless square that was set aside in 1883, it was renamed after Queen Victoria in 1907. Since that time it has received considerable improvements including many trees, the Regina Cenotaph, and a children's playground. The original centerpiece of the park was the Davin Fountain, named after Nicholas Flood Davin, local Member of Parliament and founder of the Regina Leader-Post newspaper. The fountain was removed in 1926 when the Cenotaph was erected in its place.

== Regina Cenotaph ==
The Cenotaph in Regina was built in honour Regina's fallen heroes of World War I. The cenotaph replaced the fountain that honoured Nicholas Flood Davin, which had stood in Victoria Park since 1908. The Cenotaph was unveiled on November 11, 1926. A rededication was held in 1990 to honour those Regina citizens who served in World War II and the Korean War and inscription was added to the monument.

== Gallery ==
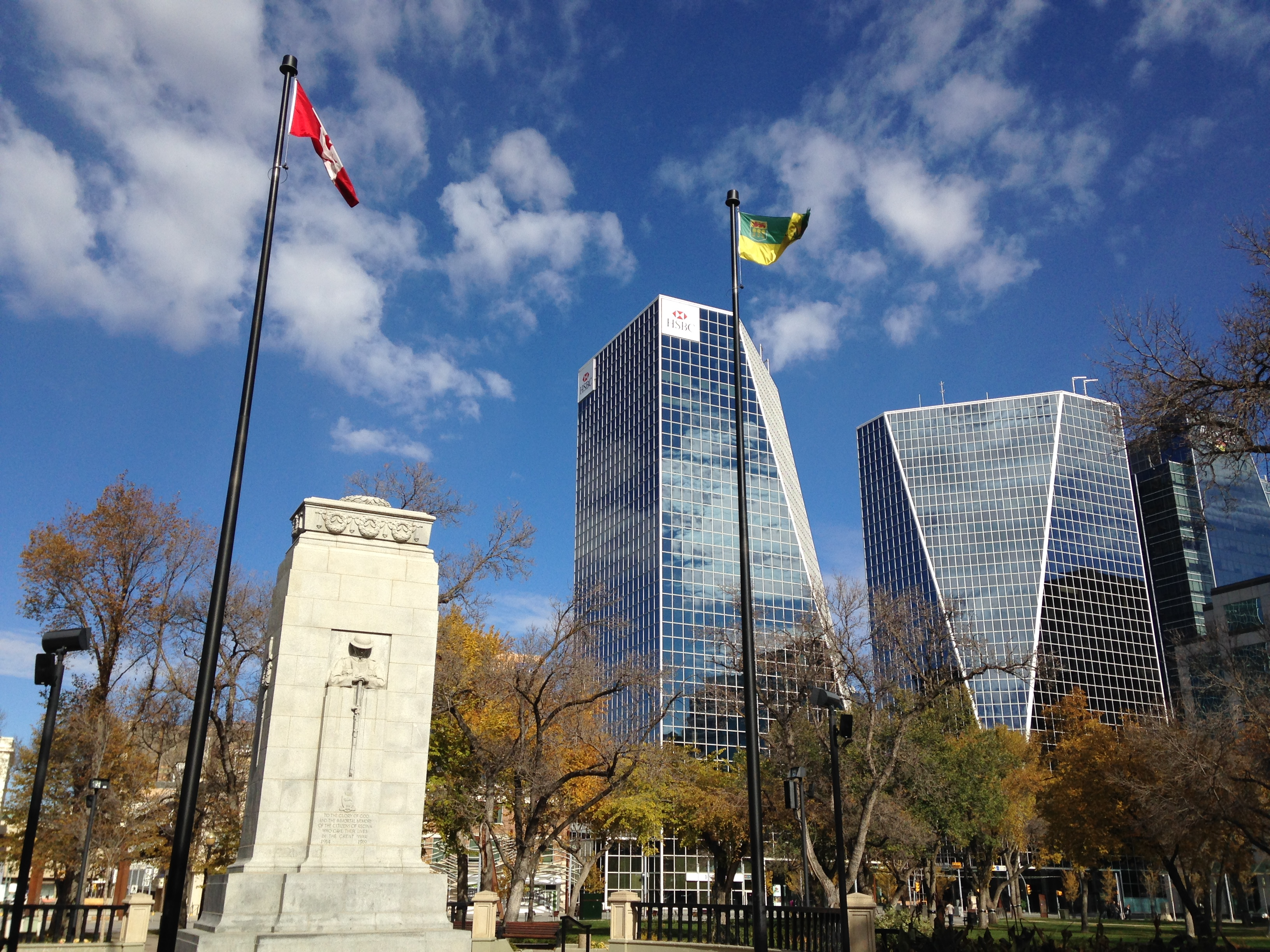
Looking north-east in Victoria Park

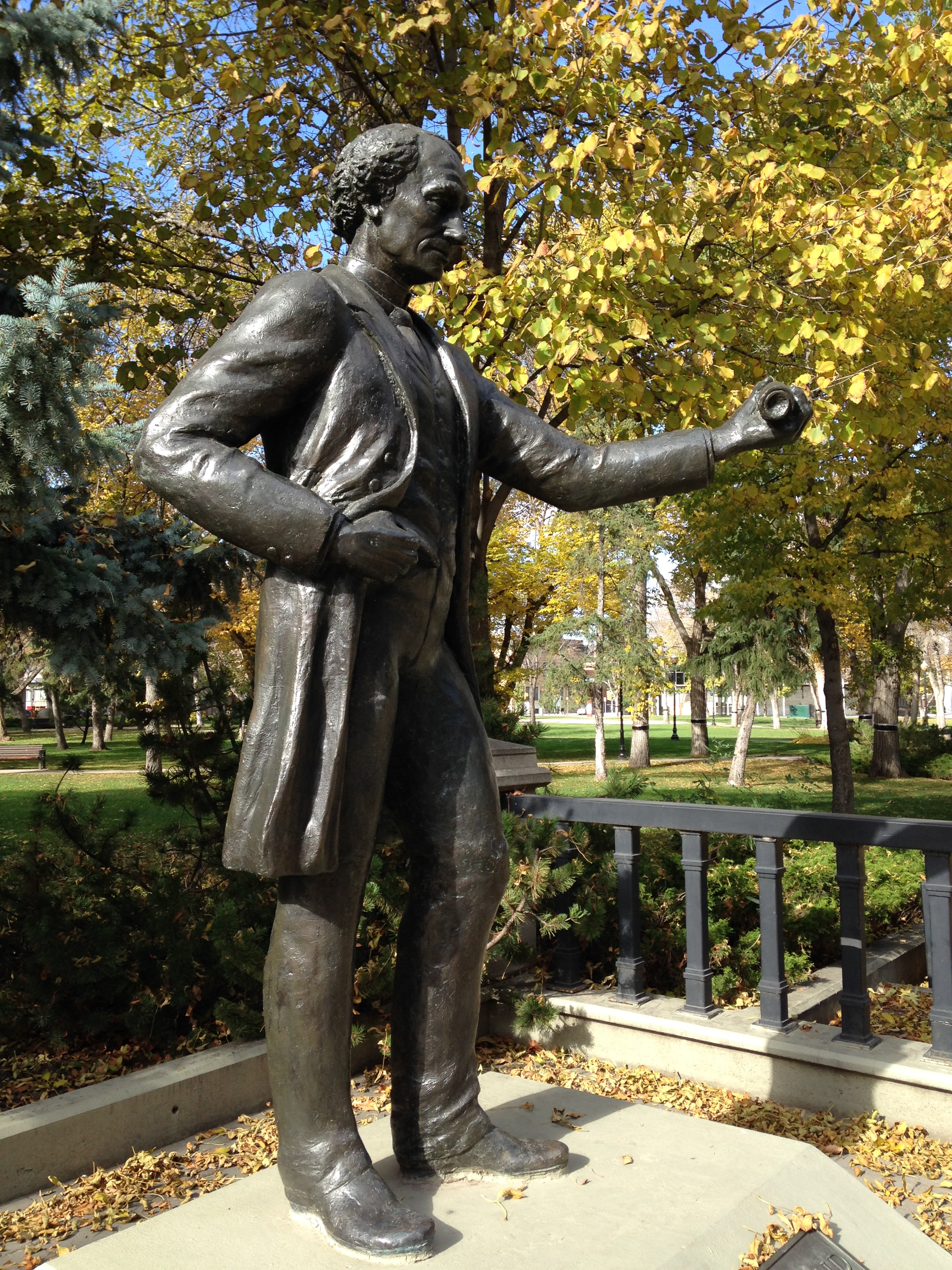
Statue of Sir John A. Macdonald

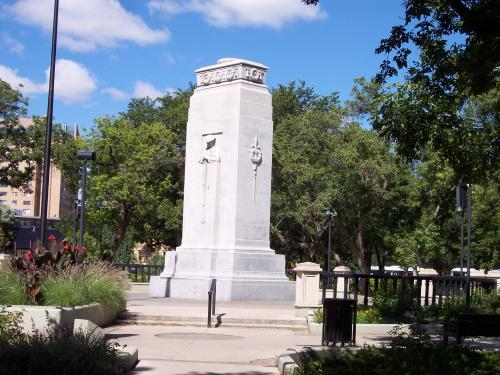
Cenotaph

== See also ==
- Royal eponyms in Canada
