= CBC Winnipeg Orchestra =

Canadian radio orchestra

- Orchestra
- Short name: CBCWO
- Founded: 1947; 79 years ago
- Disbanded: 1984; 42 years ago
- Location: Winnipeg, Manitoba
- Concert hall: Winnipeg Auditorium (1947–1967); Centennial Concert Hall (1968–1984)
- Principal conductor: Eric Wild (1947–1974); Boris Brott (1975–1984)

The CBC Winnipeg Orchestra (CBCWO) was a radio orchestra based in Winnipeg, Manitoba, Canada. It was operated by the Canadian Broadcasting Corporation for 37 years. The orchestra mainly performed on CBC Radio, but also occasionally performed live concerts in Winnipeg, including the CBC Winnipeg Festival. Many of its members also played in the Winnipeg Symphony Orchestra.

== History ==
The CBCWO was established in 1947 under the leadership of conductor Eric Wild. Wild remained principal conductor for 27 years. During his tenure he conducted the premieres of several works by Canadian composers. He notably recorded Calixa Lavallée's comic opera The Widow with the CBCWO in 1967. Upon Wild's retirement in 1974, the CBCWO's concertmaster Arthur Polson served as interim director. In April 1975 Boris Brott was appointed conductor of the orchestra. He remained in that post until the orchestra was disbanded in 1984.
