= Eric Wild (conductor) =

Eric Lees Wild
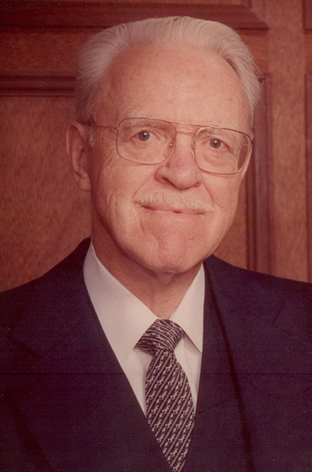
- Photograph of conductor Eric Lees Wild taken in 1985
- Born: Eric Lees Wild; 11 February 1910; Sault Ste. Marie, Ontario, Canada
- Died: 29 April 1989 (aged 79); Osprey, Florida, United states
- Education: University of Michigan
- Occupation: Conductor
- Spouse: Anna Linnea Hartz
- Children: Eric, James, John, and Angela
- Musical career
- Genres: Classical
- Years active: 1933–1974
- Formerly of: BBC Symphony Orchestra; Canadian Broadcasting Corporation; CBC Winnipeg Orchestra; Royal Winnipeg Ballet

Eric Lees Wild (11 February 1910 – 29 April 1989) was a Canadian conductor, trumpeter, arranger, and composer. He was the youngest child of Isaac Ashton Wild (1871–1963) and Sarah Ann Wild (née Brooks) (1874–1971) who emigrated from Lancashire, England in 1901.

== Life and career ==
Born in Sault Ste. Marie, Ontario, Wild studied conducting and arranging at the University of Michigan where he earned a Bachelor of Music in 1932. From 1933–36 he worked as an arranger for the Canadian Radio Broadcasting Commission in Toronto where he frequently collaborated with conductor Geoffrey Waddington. He toured to London as a member of Billy Bissett's Canadian Band in 1936–38. During that time, he also served as principal trumpeter and arranger for the BBC Symphony Orchestra 1936–39, and appeared with his own band on BBC Television.

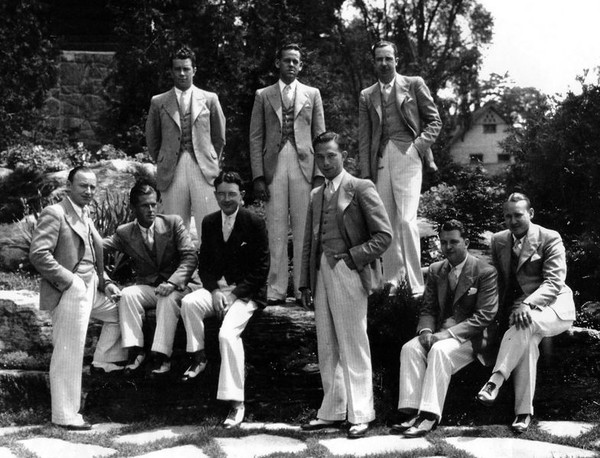
Billie Bissett and His Canadians dance band in Monaco, July 1936

As a member of Billy Bissett's band, Billy Bissett and His Canadians, Wild travelled to Monaco to perform at the International Sporting Club resort casino in Monte Carlo. The band was then booked at Savoy Hotel, London in 1936 and The May Fair Hotel, London in 1936 and 1937. In 1937 Wild was offered his own programme on the BBC, Eric Wild and the Tea-Timers, which was the first television dance band ever broadcast.

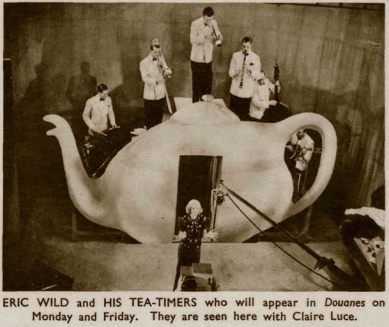
Eric Wild and His Tea-Timers July 1937

Wild returned to Toronto in the autumn of 1939 to assume a conducting position with the Canadian Broadcasting Corporation. He left that post in 1942 to become music director of the revue Meet the Navy where he remained through 1945. He then returned to CBC Toronto to conduct for the programs like the Wayne and Shuster Show and The Alan Young Show. From 1965–78 he was music director of the CBC Television program Hymn Sing which featured a choir that occasionally performed arrangements and original music by Wild.

From 1947–74 Wild was principal conductor of the CBC Winnipeg Orchestra with whom he conducted premieres of several works by Canadian composers. He notably recorded Calixa Lavallée's comic opera The Widow with the orchestra in 1967. He also served as the music director of the Royal Winnipeg Ballet from 1955–62. He died in Osprey, Florida at the age of 79.

== Personal life ==
Wild met Anna Linnea Hartz (Hërts) at the University of Michigan where she also earned a Bachelor of Music in 1932. Anna Linnea was the daughter of Swedish Sámi people, the only indigenous people of Europe, who emigrated to the US in 1891. The couple married on 1 July 1932 in Ann Arbor, and their first child, Eric, was born in 1933. They moved to London in 1936 where twin sons, James and John, were born in 1936 and a daughter, Angela, was born in 1939. The family was evacuated to Toronto in 1939 after the outbreak of WWII.
