= Nathan Wiens =

Canadian naturalistic designer and woodworker

- Born: 1963-1964 (Note: He was said to be 43 in 2006 and 50 in 2014.); Regina, Saskatchewan
- Known for: Woodworking, naturalistic design, arts production
- Spouse: Christa Wiens
- Website: https://www.chapelarts.com/

Nathan Wiens is a Canadian naturalistic designer and woodworker. Wiens founded Chapel Arts in the Railtown district of Vancouver in 2006.

== Childhood and youth ==
Nathan Wiens is the son of architect Clifford Wiens and artist (pottery) and educator Patricia Wiens. The family visited art galleries, attended powwows, and played music at home. As a child, the young Wiens was also a potter. He says his father had "immeasurable influence" on him: "He and my mother created a rich creative environment for my five sisters and myself... He has been a tough act to follow, but he's left me room to rise as my own man."

In high school, Wiens played in a band called "Nick Danger" with Colin James.

== Career ==
In the early to mid 1980s Wiens worked in the music industry "as a builder, roadie and performer" in the "underground" punk music scene. Wiens travelled to Vancouver, British Columbia for the first time during Expo 86 to work on installations with Edward Poitras and over time established himself there working as an artist and producer.

=== Woodworker ===
Wiens is known as a craftsman of naturalistic custom wood furniture pieces, but he is sometimes willing to reproduce some pieces, such as dining room table with a curved indent which proved popular. In Vancouver, his work may be found in stores such as ALife and John Fluevog (the biggest client), as well as the Shine nightclub and the Edgewater Casino.

==== Process ====
Wiens describes his woodworking process as "tunnelling", something influenced by his experience with pottery as a child:

We shuffle a deck of all these parts that create shapes, out of flat panels, kind of like a topographical map, using the CNC machine. Like architectural models do the landscape – in layers. We do this with wood, on budgets sometimes modest, sometimes grand.

Large scale pieces have come out of the process in the manner of matrioschka, one piece fitting inside the other.

==== Studio ====
Chapel Arts complex
- Former names: Chapel of Flowers; Armstrong and Hotson Undertakers; Armstrong & Co. Funeral Directors

General information
- Architectural style: Art deco (façade, 1936)
- Location: Railtown, Vancouver, British Columbia, 304 & 305 Dunlevy Avenue
- Opened: 2006 (venue and gallery); ca. 1911 (funeral home); ca. 1892 (house)
- Owner: Nathan Wiens (current); Armstrong family (former)

In about 2004, Wiens was looking for a place to relocate his Yaletown furniture business. He found a garage at Dunlevy and Cordova in Downtown Eastside, but had to buy the Armstrong Funeral Chapel as part of the deal. The studio has 22-foot ceilings topped by strips of Douglas fir, and "piles" of reclaimed fir beams which he acquired from torn down warehouses, as well as local walnut, maple, butternut and oak. In a 2009 interview, he remarked: "Most people aren't using the vast variety of local exotics, especially on a commercial level".

=== Chapel Arts venue and gallery ===
It was all pink when I bought it, having been renovated in the 1970s — pink awnings and multi-toned pink inside. When I renovated, I tried to make it feel as it was back in 1936, including Marmoleum flooring, which was common in the 1930s.

— Nathan Wiens

If nothing else, believe in art.

— Chapel Arts business motto

The funeral home Wiens bought was originally known as the Chapel of Flowers. The building is thought to date back to 1892 or 1893, a house at first, with additions to the building in 1911 or 1912 when it became Armstrong and Hotson Undertakers, and then in 1936 an art deco façade was added giving the appearance of a single structure. It was renamed Armstrong & Co. Funeral Directors. Like the studio, the interior has high ceilings.

Seeing that the building he was purchasing came with a hall, Wiens saw its potential as a centre for the arts and other purposes: "Once I owned the chapel, I envisioned it as a family, community arts and multi-use facility. The community is always screaming for such facilities, which remain scarce in the area, so it served a need." He spent several months renovating and refurbishing it until it officially opened as a 126-seat venue in December 2006 with a live concert. Wiens christened the new venue Chapel Arts. It has since evolved into a group of "creators, fabricators, and artists" led by Wiens.

The performance space is located on the lower level in the 1936 addition, formerly the funeral chapel itself, next to which is a hidden driveway, originally for the hearse, while at the other side of the performance space is the 1911/2 addition, the original chapel. The upper level, once the coffin display room, now serves as a community art gallery.

Since the Spring of 2008, Chapel Arts has hosted various acts and community events, concerts, parties, meetings, and grad shows for, among others, Kwantlen Polytechnic University's visual arts program and the Emily Carr University of Art and Design.

=== Related pursuits ===
Wiens has collaborated with MascallDance on more than one occasion, notably Caribou (1991) for Ron Stewart and Outliner (2016), a solo performance by his sister Robin Poitras, for whom he created dresses made out of wood.

== Personal life ==
When asked about the significance of naming his workshop The chapel, Wiens said he is not religious: "I was raised in a family filled with artists and stuff, so I guess that's what I believe in. I believe in makers instead of The Maker."
