= TJ Cuthand =

Canadian (Cree) filmmaker

Theo Jean Cuthand
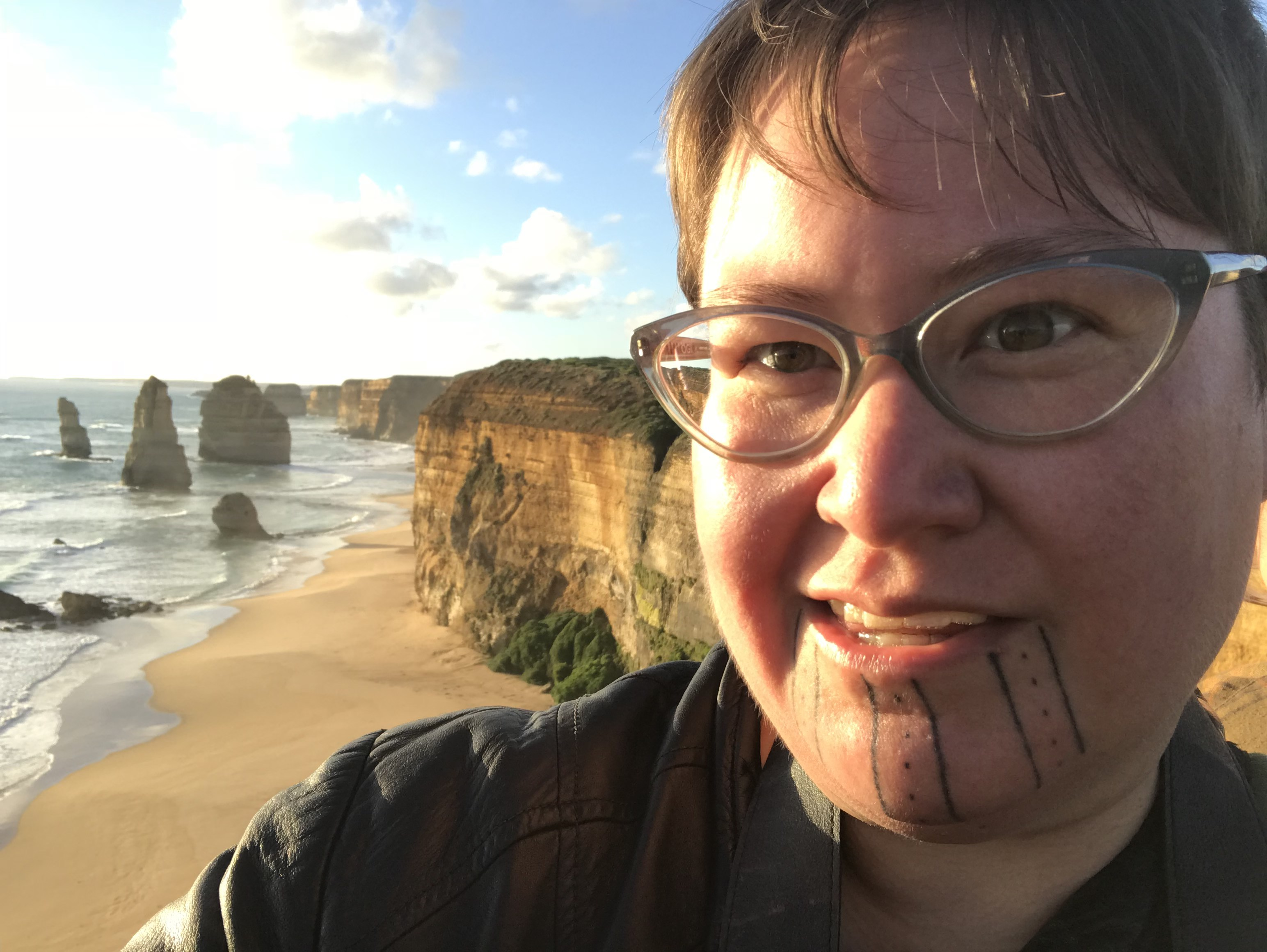
- Born: 1978 (age 47–48); Regina, Saskatchewan, Canada
- Occupation: Artist
- Years active: 1995–present
- Parents: Ruth Cuthand; Edward Poitras
- Relatives: Lori Blondeau (aunt)
- Website: tjcuthand.com

Theo Jean Cuthand, also credited as TJ Cuthand and Thirza Cuthand, is a filmmaker and performance artist, writer and curator of Plains Cree as well as Scottish and Irish descent. He is credited with coining the term Indigiqueer, for modern Indigenous LGBTQ people. In May 2022, he changed his name to TJ Cuthand and came out as a trans man.

His work as a video artist began in high school, as he experimented with a DIY and "diarist" aesthetic that he has continued to develop in subsequent works. His experimental film and videos often feature a personal perspective, voice-over narration, and storytelling that explores his experiences of identity, race, sexuality, relationships, ageism and mental health.

In 1995, when he was 16, he participated in a workshop at a queer film festival in Saskatoon, which led to the production of his first short video, Lessons in Baby Dyke Theory, which was then screened at film festivals around the world. In bios at the time, Cuthand self-described as a "bipolar butch lesbian two spirited boy/girl thingamabob".

== Early life and career ==
Born in 1978 in Regina, Saskatchewan, Cuthand grew up amongst artists in Saskatoon.

Cuthand credits Maureen Bradley with teaching him how to make his first video. Other early mentors include Dana Claxton, Shawna Dempsey and Lorri Milan.

In 1995, Cuthand's first short, experimental film, Lessons in Baby Dyke Theory, was screened to international audiences when he was just 16. In 1999 he was selected for an artist residency at Videopool and Urban Shaman where he completed Through the Looking Glass, a work that plays off Lewis Carroll's novel of the same title, and sees Cuthand play the role of Alice, in conversation with the Red Queen (played by Cosmosquaw AKA Lori Blondeau) and the White Queen (Shawna Dempsey) as a device to discuss cultural heritage and the construction of race.

Following this early success, he went on to complete a BFA in film and video at the Emily Carr University of Art & Design in Vancouver.

Cuthand's work has been presented at numerous festivals and exhibitions including the Whitney Biennial (USA), Walker Art Centre (Minneapolis), Mackenzie Art Gallery (Regina), Oberhausen International Short Film Festival (Germany), San Francisco Gay and Lesbian Film Festival, Optic Nerve (Peterborough) The Women's Television Network, MIX NY, the Walter Phillips Gallery (Banff), Mendel Art Gallery (Saskatoon), MIX Brasil Festival of Sexual Diversity, New York Exposition of Short Film and Video, 9e Biennale de l'Image en Mouvement (Geneva) and the 70th Berlin International Film Festival.

He was featured in the 2019 Whitney Biennial, and the film program, What Was Always Yours and Never Lost, yet shared his disappointment in the controversies of Whitney Museum vice-chair, Warren Kanders's implication in war profiteering.

Cuthand's Woman Dress (2019) was screened at the Canadian Museum for Human Rights in June, 2021.

Cuthand moved to Toronto to be closer to more industry resources, help develop his practice and continue to work on short films. He has self-funded many of his own projects though he increasingly works with larger budgets.

Cuthand is credited with coining a term for Indigenous LGBT people, that is now in use in addition to, or as an alternative for, two-spirit - Indigiqueer. Originally spelled Indigequeer, Cuthand coined the term for the title of the 2004 Vancouver Queer Film Festival's Indigenous/two-spirit Program. He has written that he came up with Indigiqueer "because some LGBTQ Indigenous people don't feel as comfortable with the two-spirit title because it implies some dual gender stuff, which some people just don't feel describes their identity."

== Awards ==
In 2017 Cuthand was awarded the Hnatyshyn Foundation's REVEAL Indigenous Art Award. In 2021 his short film Kwêskosîw (She Whistles) won a Golden Sheaf for Short Subject- Fiction at the Yorkton Film Festival, the Mana Advancement of Indigenous Rights Award at the Wairoa Maori Film Festival in New Zealand, and the Bronze Audience Award for Best Canadian Short at Fantasia.
