= Wascana Centre =

Urban park in Saskatchewan, Canada

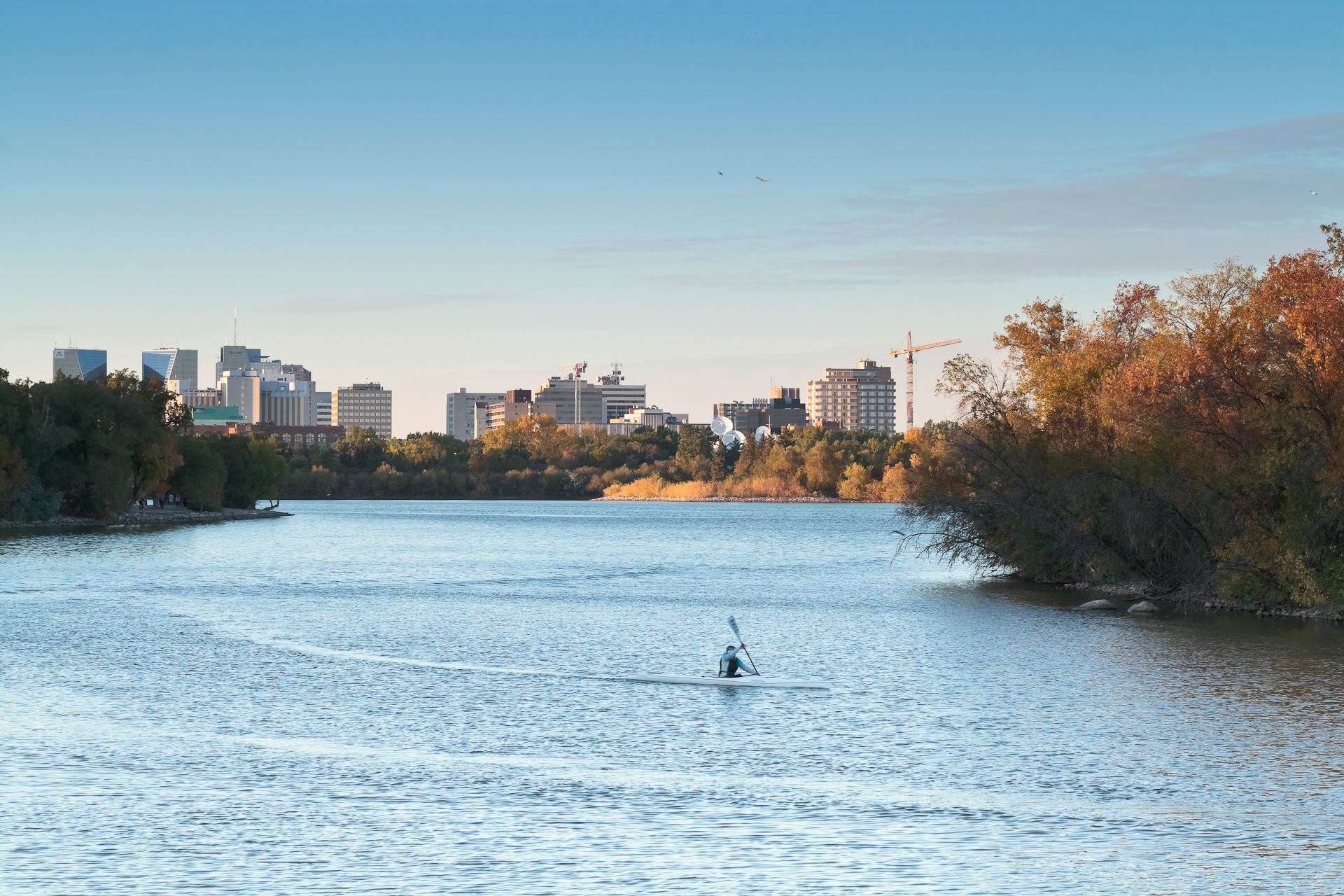
- Downtown Regina, seen from Wascana Lake in Wascana Centre
- Interactive map of Wascana Centre
- Type: Public park
- Location: Regina, Saskatchewan
- Coordinates: 50.4325°N 104.6068°W
- Area: 9.3 square kilometres (2,300 acres)
- Created: 1908; 1962 (incorporation)
- Operator: Government of Saskatchewan
- Status: Open all year

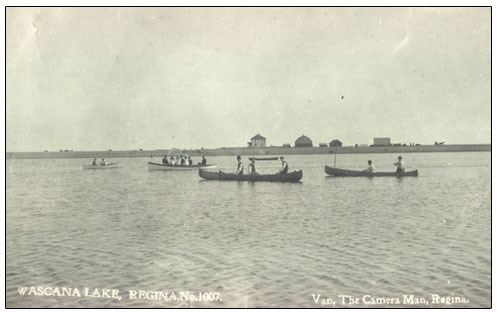
Canoeing on Wascana Lake, pre-1905 when weir was 1 1/2 blocks west of present location and lake larger: Note farm buildings on the future site of the provincial legislative building

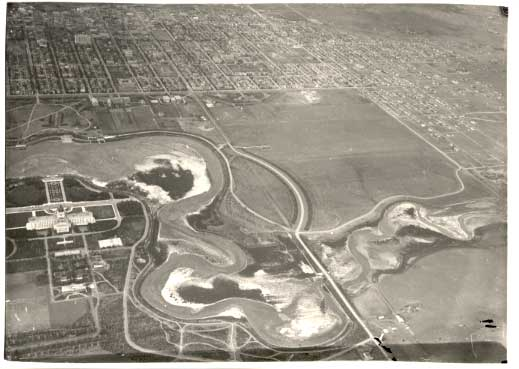
Wascana Lake drained in 1931 prior to the deepening of the bed. Note Regina College, the Normal School and the landscaped diagonal site of the never-built Anglican Cathedral on the corner of Broad St and College Avenue

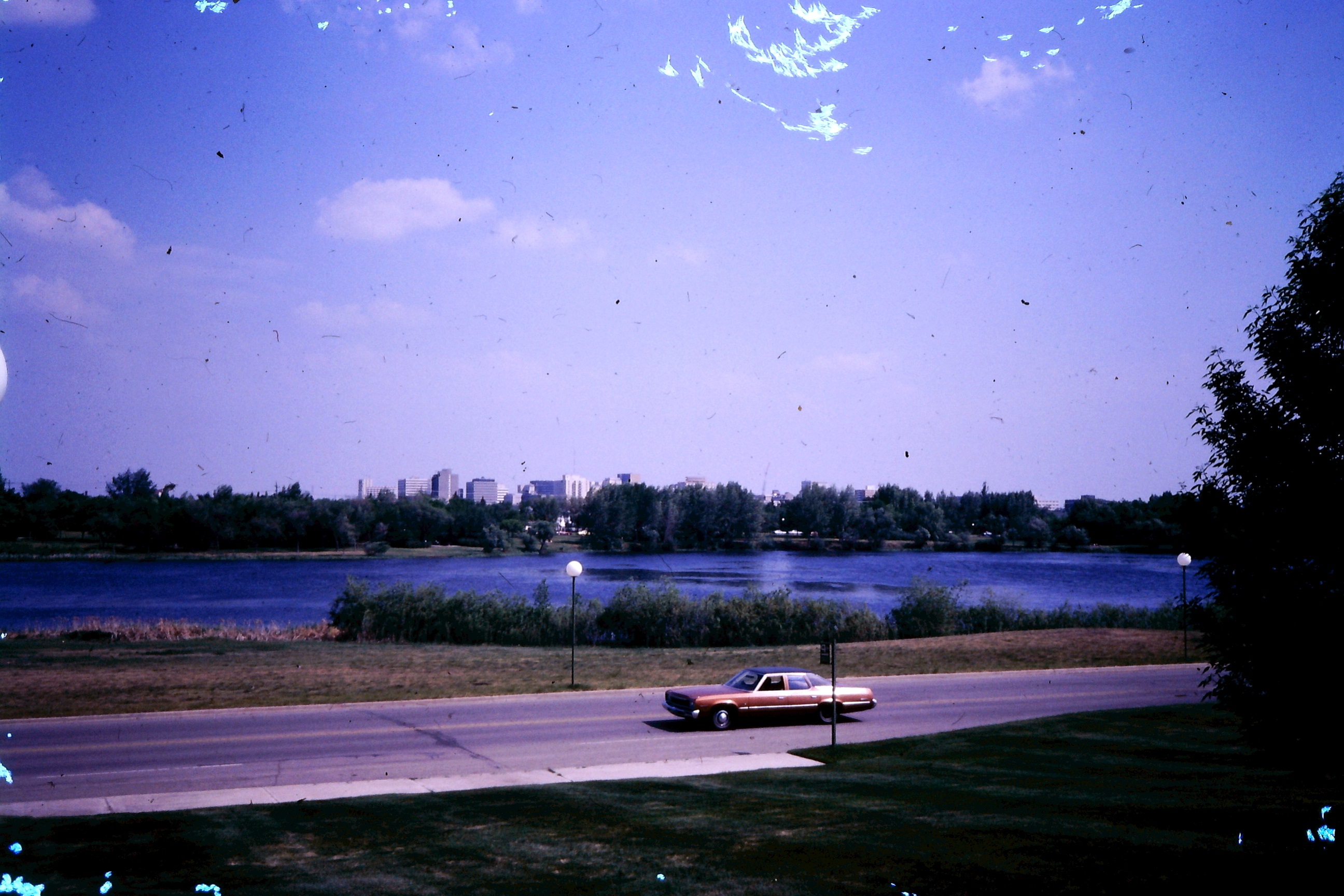
Wascana Lake from the Legislative Building in the 1970s

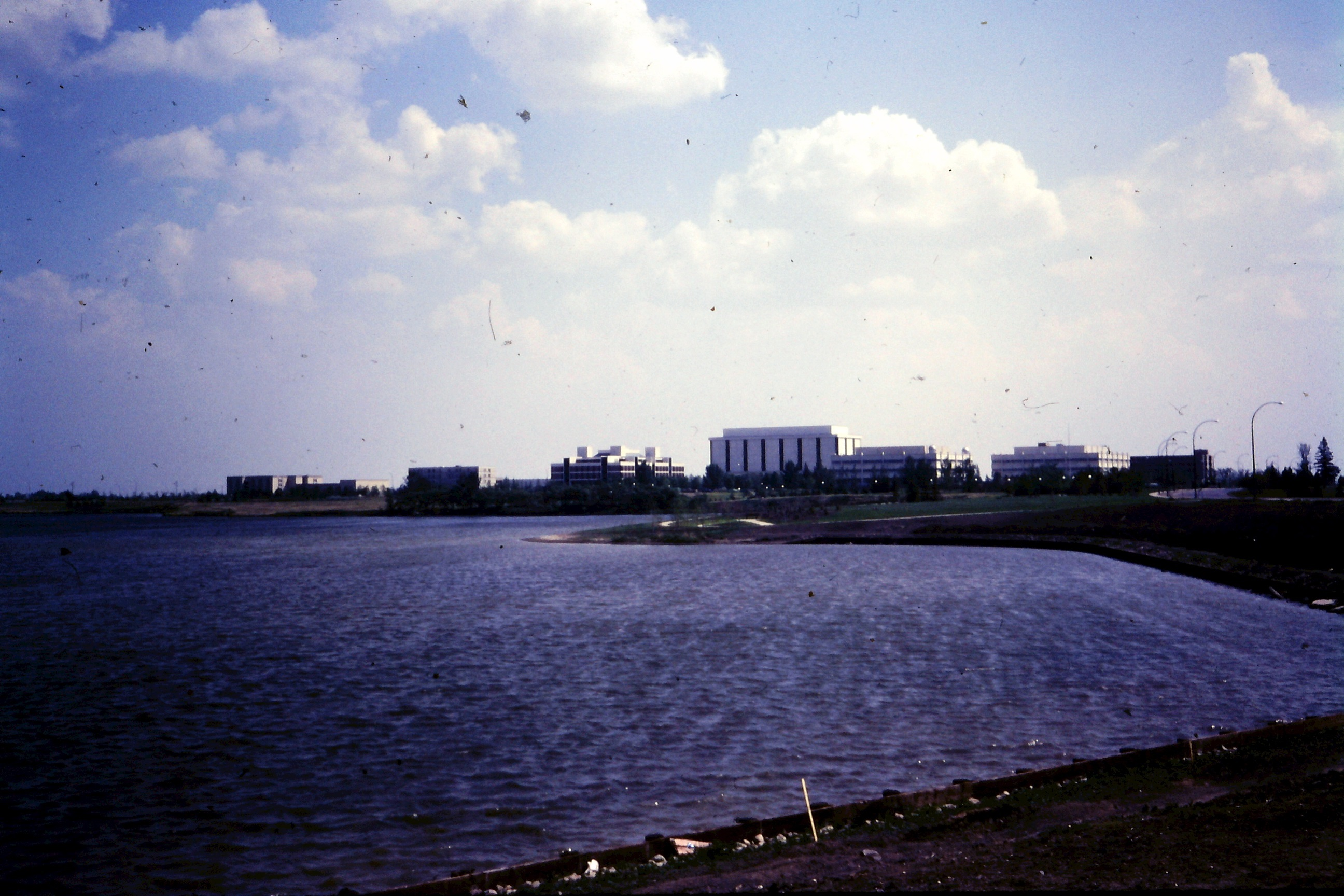
Regina Campus from Wascana Lake before it became University of Regina in June 1974

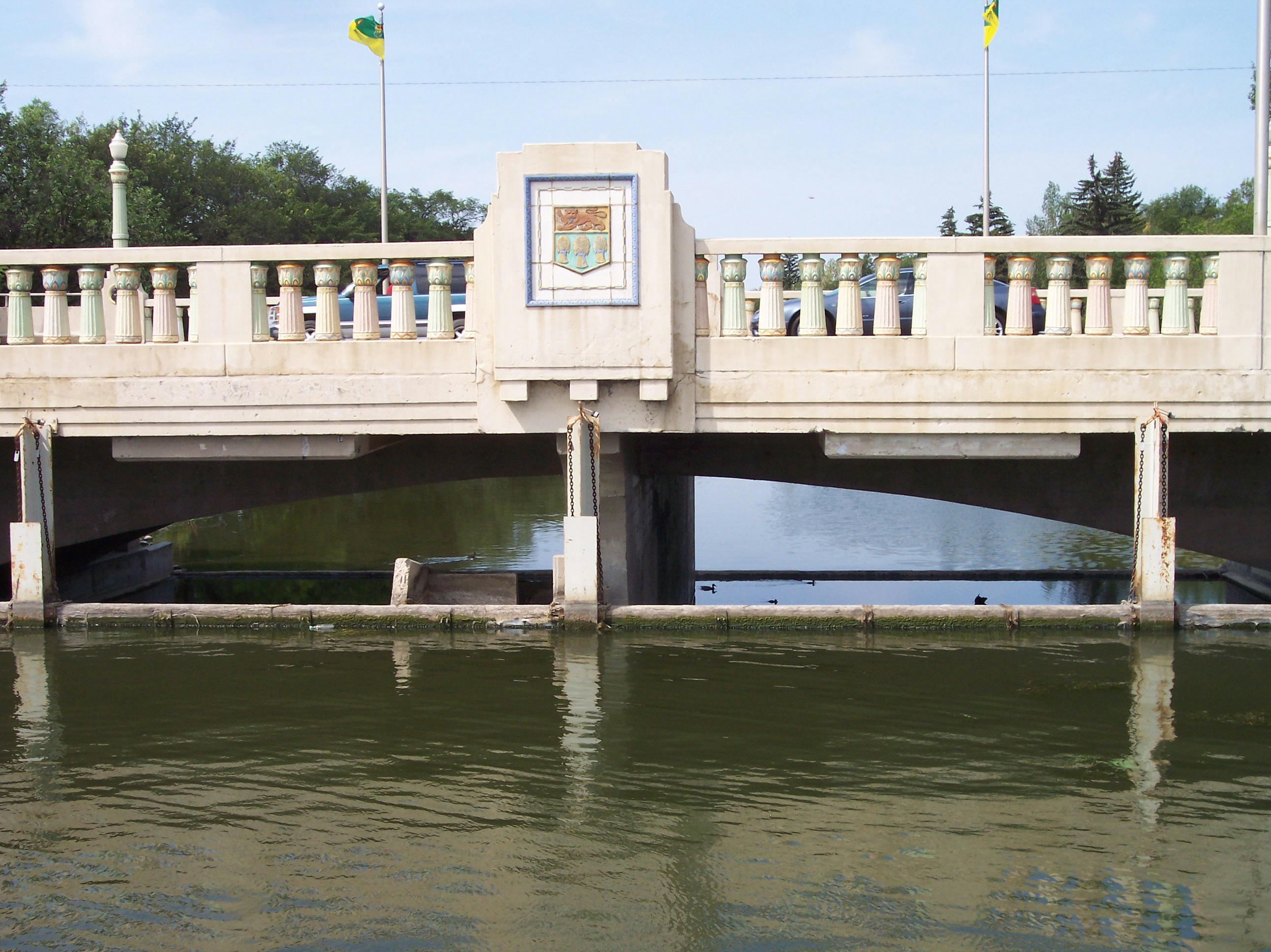
Weir across Wascana Creek creating reservoir of Wascana Lake which is the focal point of the Wascana Centre

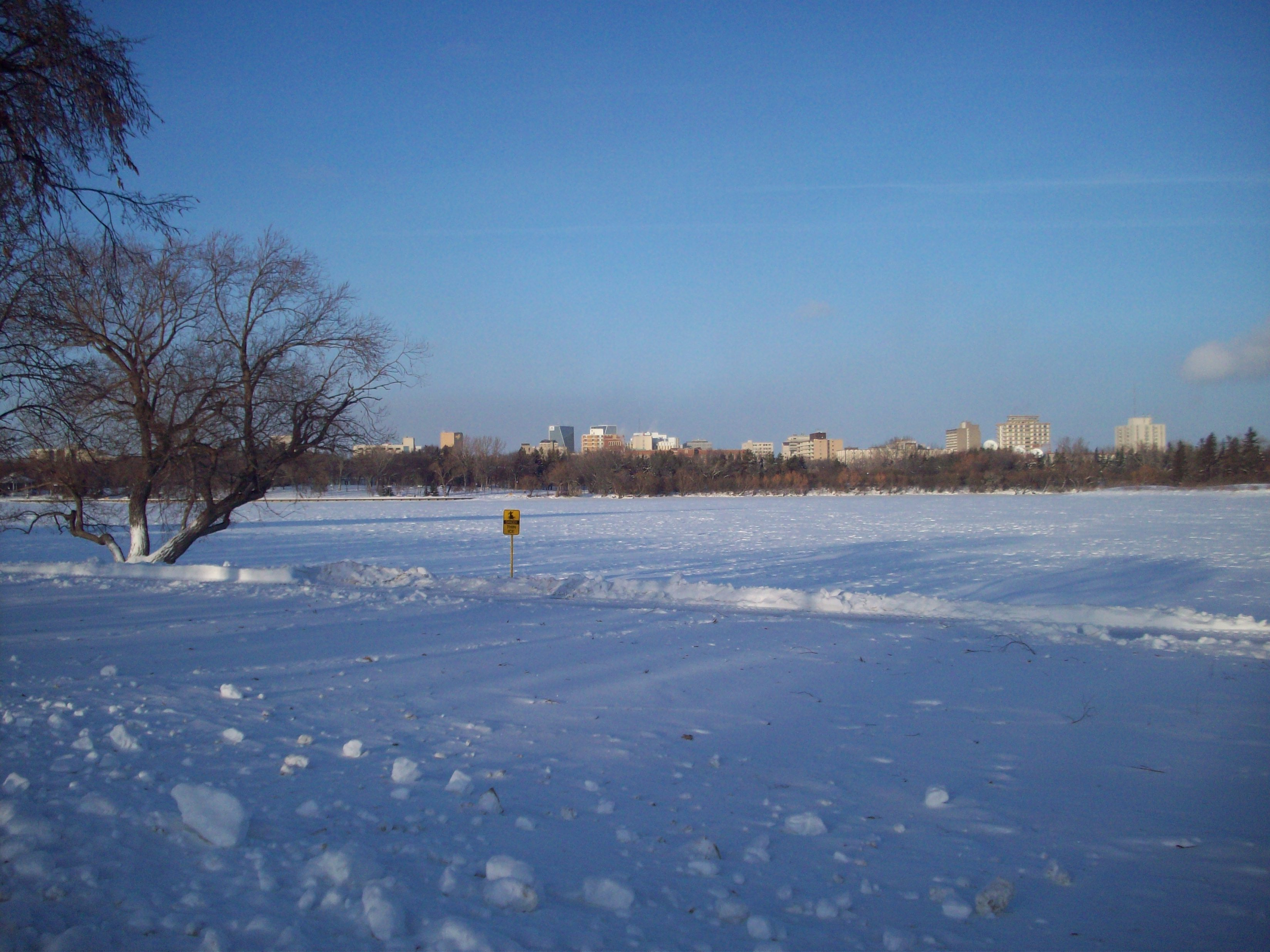
Wascana Lake in winter from south shore near the legislative building

Wascana Centre is a 930-hectare (9.3 km^{2}/2,300 acre/3.6 mi^{2}) urban park built around Wascana Lake in Regina, Saskatchewan, Canada, established in 1912 with a design from renowned architect Thomas Mawson. The park is designed around the Saskatchewan Legislative Building and Wascana Lake. High-profile features include the University of Regina, Royal Saskatchewan Museum, Conexus Arts Centre, Saskatchewan Science Centre, and CBC Regional Broadcast Centre. Wascana Centre brings together lands and buildings owned by the City of Regina, University of Regina, and Province of Saskatchewan. The park is located immediately south of the city's downtown core, bordered by residential areas on the east, south and west, and on the south-east edge it spills out onto open Saskatchewan prairie along Wascana Creek.

Wascana lake was created in 1883 by damming Wascana Creek, a low flow seasonal run-off stream, to serve as a reliable water reservoir for the town and railway, and which residents readily began using for recreation. In 1905 Saskatchewan gained provincial status and planning began on a monumental — and in retrospect wildly optimistic — new capital building in Regina, a vision which required an equally monumental landscaping plan. The new Saskatchewan Legislative Building was completed in 1912 and with it the 1912 Mawson Plan for Wascana Park.

By the 1950s the city was growing rapidly and pressures on the park led to its incorporation as the Wascana Centre Authority (1962), with a mandate to establish an ongoing vision protecting the park as a valued asset of the city and province. The first Master Plan was developed the same year in conjunction with a new University of Saskatchewan campus to be built on the southeast end of the park. A revised Master Plan has been published every five to seven years since, the most recent being 2016.

In 2017 Wascana Centre Authority was dissolved and management was absorbed into the Saskatchewan government's Provincial Capital Commission.

== History ==
The name "Wascana" is derived from the Cree word Oscana meaning "pile of bones" in reference to the plains bison bones scattered around Wascana Creek before the area was populated by non-indigenous people.

Wascana Lake was originally created in 1883 by damming Wascana Creek between Angus and Rae Streets, 1 1/2 blocks west of the present Albert Street dam and bridge, to provide a "stock watering hole" — the rolling stock of the CPR, that is. The Lake was soon turned to recreational use and Reginans took to the lake for sailing and canoeing.

In 1905 the newly formed provincial government set about to build a capital building, to be located in Regina. Landscape architect Frederick Todd was asked to perform an initial design study for the lands around the building and lake, completed in 1907 and styled on the English Romantic Landscape movement. The lake was slightly reduced in 1908 when a new dam and bridge were constructed in their present location, based on Todd's initial designs and advancing plans for the park. As the project developed an expanded plan was requested from architect Thomas Mawson, submitted in 1912 and which became the park template for the next five decades.

The lake continued for a time to be used as a domestic water supply and for stock watering; it also supplied the new legislative building. A longer term effect resulted, however, when lake water was used to cool machinery in the power plant (now the Powerhouse Museum) that was built in the eastern sector. Heated water returned to the lake, causing that sector to remain ice-free through the winter, and several species of migratory birds made it their year-round habitat. Although the old coal-fired power plant was decommissioned in the early 1970s, a permanent/non-migrating flock of Canada geese habituated to wintering in the city had to be rounded up and either transported out of the city or if injured then housed in a waterfowl sanctuary. The annual goose round-up continued into the 1990s. The eastern sector of the lake continues to be a waterfowl sanctuary.

Wascana Lake was drained and deepened in the 1930s as part of a government relief project. 2,100 men widened and dredged the lake bed and created two islands using only hand tools and horse-drawn wagons.

It was decided to establish a new campus in Regina for the University of Saskatchewan beyond the College Avenue buildings dating back to 1911, beginning as a private Methodist secondary school which became the College Avenue Campus. Minoru Yamasaki was commissioned in 1961 to prepare a 100-year master plan for the whole of a Wascana Centre including the new university complex, enlisting California landscape architect Thomas Church in the effort. Yamasaki's vision has largely been adhered to, notwithstanding some controversy over the years as to the suitability of his stark modernist buildings for the featureless Regina plain. This university would become an independent University of Regina in 1974.

During the fall and winter of 2003–2004, Wascana Lake was again drained and dredged to deepen it by an average of about 5 metres (16 ft). The Big Dig, as it was known locally, was primarily to decrease aquatic weed growth, improve water quality, and allow more competitive and recreational canoeing and paddling during the summer months. The Big Dig also included the addition of a new island and general re-landscaping around the lake. The dredging was completed in mid-March 2004, in time for the spring runoff. The lake includes several small islands: Willow Island, Spruce Island, Pine Island, Goose Island and Tern Island.

The Wascana Racing Canoe Club and Wascana Centre have hosted the 2006 Canadian Sprint CanoeKayak National Championships in 2006 and 2010 and again in 2014 along with the canoe/kayak event at the 2014 North American Indigenous Games.

== Statistics ==
At one time Wascana Park was among the largest urban parks in Canada, if not the largest, but in 1968 St. John's, Newfoundland's Pippy Park was established at 3,400 acres — 1100 acres larger than Wascana. Since then other large urban centres have added to the list. In its day, Wascana Park edged out Rockwood Park — built in 1871, 2200 acres — in Saint John, New Brunswick by 100 acres. Wascana Centre is larger than New York City's Central Park at 843 acres (3.4 km^{2}) and Vancouver's Stanley Park at 1,000 acres (4 km^{2}). Wascana Centre promotional literature claims to be the fourth largest urban park in Canada.

== Wascana Lake Urban Revitalization Project ==
The Wascana Lake Urban Revitalization Project, known locally as the Big Dig, was an $18 million project to deepen Wascana Lake. The project took place during the winter of 2004.

=== Background ===
Wascana Lake was drained in the 1930s as part of a government relief project; 2,100 men widened and dredged the lake bed and created two islands using only hand tools and horse-drawn wagons. During the late 20th century, sediment accumulating at the bottom of the lake eventually reduced its depth by 35 per cent, which had reached 1.5 metres by 2003. In addition, there was an abundance of weeds throughout the lake.

The funding of the project was jointly shared by the federal, provincial and municipal governments. Half of the funding was provided by the Government of Canada while the Province of Saskatchewan and the City of Regina committed $5 million and $4 million respectively.

=== Excavation ===
Excavation of the lake was performed by Dominion Construction of Regina and Broda Construction of Kamsack. The lake was dredged to an overall depth of 5.5 metres with a deeper section of 7.5 metres serving as a fish habitat. Over 1.3 million cubic metres of soil was removed from the lake bottom between 6 January and 21 March with crews working 24 hours a day.

=== Additional construction ===
In addition to the deepening of the lake, construction crews created additional features.

A new island was created from the Broad Street Bridge abutment. The island includes a bridge for pedestrian access, as well as a pedestrian path and a waterfall and provides a great location for spectator viewing of canoe/kayak and rowing races hosted on Wascana Lake. In 2014, Wascana Racing Canoe Club, the Regina Rowing Club and Wascana Centre Authority, with significant financial support from Tourism Regina, completed the construction of a Finish Line Tower on Pine Island. This makes Wascana Lake a world-class venue for competitive canoe/kayak and rowing competitions.

Crews installed a dozen aeration filters throughout the lake to produce oxygen to the water in order to improve its life-supporting quality. A circular fountain was erected in the centre of the lake opposite the legislative building.

The creation of a new pathway adjacent to the Albert Street Bridge now connects the paths on the north and south shores, providing a complete walkway around the lake. In addition, the south pedestrian path now passes under the Broad Street Bridge connecting the east and west recreation areas.

== See also ==
- Saskatchewan Water Security Agency
- List of dams and reservoirs in Canada
- List of lakes of Saskatchewan
- Saskatchewan War Memorial, located within the park
