= Robin Poitras =

Canadian dancer and artist

Robin Poitras CM
- Born: Robin Wiens; 1958? (58 in 2016); Regina, Saskatchewan
- Education: B.F.A.
- Alma mater: York University
- Known for: Dancer, performance artist, installation artist, curator
- Spouses: Edward Poitras (divorced); Tim Murphy
- Awards: Lieutenant Governor's Lifetime Achievement Award; City of Regina Mayor's Awards for Business & the Arts Lifetime Achievement Award; YWCA Women of Distinction Award for the Arts
- Website: https://www.newdancehorizons.ca/

Robin Poitras CM (née Wiens (born c. 1958) is a Canadian dancer, choreographer, performance and installation artist based in Regina, Saskatchewan, who has been actively engaged in contemporary dance practice since the early 1980s.

Poitras co-founded New Dance Horizons in 1986 with Dianne Fraser. Through her research in diverse fields of artistic and somatic practice, Poitras developed a unique interdisciplinary approach. Her works have been presented across Canada and internationally.

== Early life and education ==
Robin Poitras is the second child of architect Clifford Wiens and artist and educator Patricia Wiens.

In her twenties, Poitras completed a B.F.A. (Special Honours) in dance at York University.

Poitras undertook further studies at Duke University, the American Center in Paris, and the Bill Evans Summer Institute of Dance in Winnipeg in 1984. She also studied in Montreal and Zürich.

== Career ==
=== New Dance Horizons ===
In 1986, Poitras co-founded New Dance Horizons with Dianne Fraser, a nationally recognized project-based company mandated to support the creation, development, production and presentation of contemporary dance and related performing arts in the province featuring national, international, regional and local Canadian dance artists.

==== Rouge-gorge ====
Originally entitled Intempco (a short form of In Temporary Company), Rouge-gorge (French for "robin") is a project-based creation production company led by Artistic Co-Directors Robin Poitras and renowned visual artist Edward Poitras. A foundation for creation, production and touring, it also supports co-productions with local and national dance artists. At least one new original work has been produced each season, including the Pelican Project, a series of processional performances by youth as well as established and emerging artists.

In the mid 2000s, the company moved into its own building on Harvey Street, including a fifty-seat studio theatre and administration space.

== Philosophy ==
=== Influences and aesthetics ===
Poitras, who believes the purpose of art is to "make the invisible in our lives visible", has read the ancient Greek philosopher Plato and draws on his ideas of being and becoming ("static perfection" versus "the flow of things, the transformation from one state to another", as developed in the Republic, but unlike Plato, her utopian ideal "would be characterized by change, development and exploration"; utopia in the usual sense would "never be achieved, because it is always evolving and never finished. Utopia is not a thing, a place, or a state but a process." For her, this notion is represented in dance by the concept of "centre arch", as developed by Amelia Itcush, a founding member of the Toronto Dance Theatre: a "nowhere place" or "moving place" in the foot, "that place where the weight of the body moves downward into the ground and the force of the body moves upward into space", a notion underscoring the idea of dance "as a flow or a process of movement rather than a series of fixed positions."

My practice is rooted in a physical world comprised of choreography, dancing and actions/acts.

— Robin Poitras

=== Creative process and practice ===
Poitras contrasts other forms of the utopian Platonic idea reflected in the history of dance, citing the Romantic classical ballet in which the ballerina sought to "float" above the floor "as though gravity did not exist" with her own practice, which involves "working with the forces of intentionality and gravity to discover what the limits of action might be."

I am curious about relationships and resonance among the worlds of art, science and nature and in exploring how these worlds feed back and forth in mythical, mysterious, elusive and sometimes obvious ways.

— Robin Poitras

Eschewing an ideal body type along with other traditional facets of classical dance, Poitras selects dancers solely based on their skills, and likes to work with children and older people as dancers, "mixing the professional and the amateur", and often makes use of improvisation, found or formed objects, texts, images, sound and/or other media. She constantly explores what might be possible to achieve.

Poitras once said that incorporating somatic movement in her practice probably extended her career. "I think that that work really allowed me to be able to dance longer," she said.

== Critical assessment ==
Alex MacDonald reported that some observers find certain pieces by Poitras "challenging", which she believes is a "legitimate function" of art, and that some could also be interpreted as being "political", to which she suggests that she does not set out to make political statements, she leaves it to the audience to find or not find messages in her work.

=== Accolades ===
Robin Poitras is a recipient of the 2016 Saskatchewan Lieutenant Governor Lifetime Achievement in the Arts award, the 2006 Mayor's Awards for Business & The Arts' Lifetime Achievement Award, and the 2004 YWCA Women of Distinction Award for the Arts.

== Personal life ==
=== Family ===
The Wiens had six children. Robin Poitras is second of the six children. She inherited all of her father's books as well as a violin and mandolin.

Her brother Nathan Wiens is a naturalistic designer, best known as a craftsman of custom wood furniture pieces based in Vancouver.
