= Heating and Cooling Plant (University of Regina) =

Building in Canada

General information
- Architectural style: Modernist
- Location: Regina, Saskatchewan
- Opened: 1967
- Owner: University of Regina (formerly Regina Campus, University of Saskatchewan)

Design and construction
- Architect: Clifford Wiens
- Awards and prizes: Prestressed Concrete Institute Award; Massey Medal; Prix du XXe siècle

The Central Heating and Cooling Plant at the University of Regina, often referred to simply as the Heating and Cooling Plant is a building in by architect Clifford Wiens that provides heated and chilled water to University of Regina campus buildings.

Recognized by the Royal Architectural Institute of Canada with a Massey silver medal (now the Governor General's Medal for Architecture) and the Prix du XXe siècle, the building is the only structure from Saskatchewan included in the Historic Sites and Monuments Board of Canada publication Built Heritage of the Modern Era.

The building is sited in a parking lot at the south end of the campus.

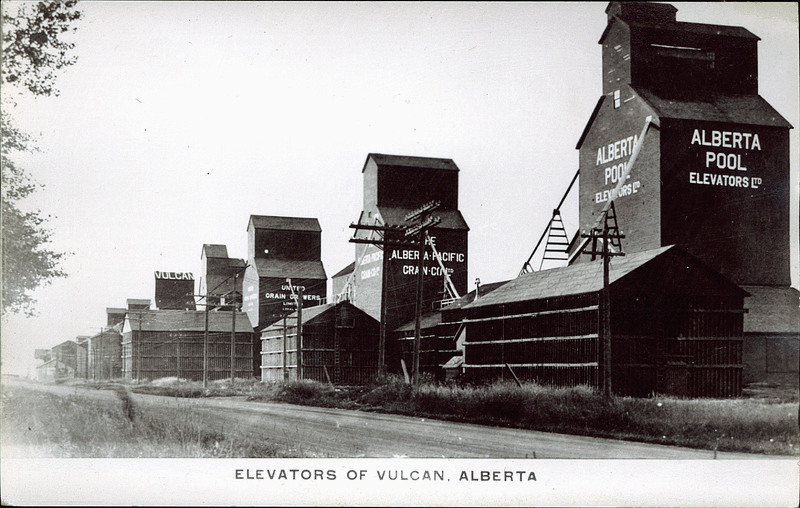
The Plant resembles the grain elevators which are a common sight on the Canadian Prairies. Those distinctive landmarks of the Prairies function as symbols and beacons, giving scale and a sense of place. —Clifford Wiens

== Description ==
Outwardly, the building is a concrete pyramid with descending struts and a triangle at its front, resembling a prairie grain elevator.

== History ==
In March 1965, plans were announced in the Regina Leader-Post for a modern central heating and air conditioning plant that would "provide architectural interest as well as warmth" to the new Regina Campus of the University of Saskatchewan, as it was known until 1974.

=== Design and materials ===
Architect Clifford Wiens said that he had to build a case "for anything more architectural than a steel box," so the A-frame is "a concrete temple to technology, with concrete bays and removable end walls set to the precise size and shape required by heaters, pumps, switches and chillers." The A-frame form is of exposed pre-cast concrete and corten steel.

Wiens left the building's steel skin unpainted, so that it acquired a brown patina.

=== Life of the building ===
As per the plans announced in 1965, the first two boilers were installed immediately, the third was added in 1970 and a fourth in 1975 when the final bay was added. The building is still standing and remains in use.

On a winter night, the building is like a glowing hearth, connoting heat, warmth and civilization.

— Jeannie Mah

== Reception ==
=== Critical response ===
The plant has been a landmark in Regina since it was first built 40 years ago and remains an example of innovative and expressive modernist architecture.

— Architecture Canada

The Heating and Cooling Plant embodies the successful marriage of sophisticated structural design, contemporary materials, adaptation of plan and section to function, and expressive form that was the goal of the best of modern architecture. The direct and unadorned industrial materials, their natural colours and simple forms reflect the utilitarian agricultural equipment and structures of the prairie farms with which Wiens was familiar, while the bold silhouette of the building recalls that ubiquitous prairie landmark, the grain elevator.

— Comment by the Jury, Prix du XXe siècle

The Heating and Cooling Plant caught national and international attention because it was "unique but also functional", as Trevor Boddy remarks: "very simple conception but powerful". It is the only structure from Saskatchewan included in the Historic Sites and Monuments Board of Canada publication Built Heritage of the Modern Era, and lauded by critics of architecture. William P. Thompson who calls the building "striking in its expressiveness and dynamism for a purely functional, industrial structure." Michelangelo Sabatino and Rhodri Windsor Liscombe call the work "powerfully evocative of ancient master-building". Ian Chodikoff considers the Plant to be the architect's masterpiece: "The building's understated exuberance is articulated through an elegant construction of site-cast concrete, a stunning counterpoint to its prairie landscape and a monument to powerful and everlasting architecture that supports research and education." Thompson likewise notes that the A-frame's resemblance to a prairie grain elevator links the project to its region.

Bernard Flaman identifies similarities between the Plant and two other works by Wiens built in the 1960s, namely the John Nugent Studio and the Silton Chapel, despite their "radically different" purposes and being formally and materially unique, exhibiting "strong, simple forms" and "ignoring modernism's dogmatic side and the dictum of flat roofs". All three find ways of filtering "the strong prairie sunlight" and establish "a delicate relationship with the landscape."

Most striking, however, is the way each building springs from the combination of a structural and an architectural idea, beginning with a close analysis of tension and compression elements that are resolved with architectural details of startling invention.

=== Accolades ===
- 5th annual Prestressed Concrete Institute Award, 1967
- Royal Architectural Institute of Canada
  - Massey silver medal, 1970
  - Prix du XXe siècle, 2011

In 2011, when Wiens took the stage in Vancouver to receive his award, he remarked that he would gladly trade the award for the chance to have his project maintained as he had originally designed it, at which the audience applauded robustly.
