= Saskatchewan Legislative Building =

Government buildings in Saskatchewan, Canada

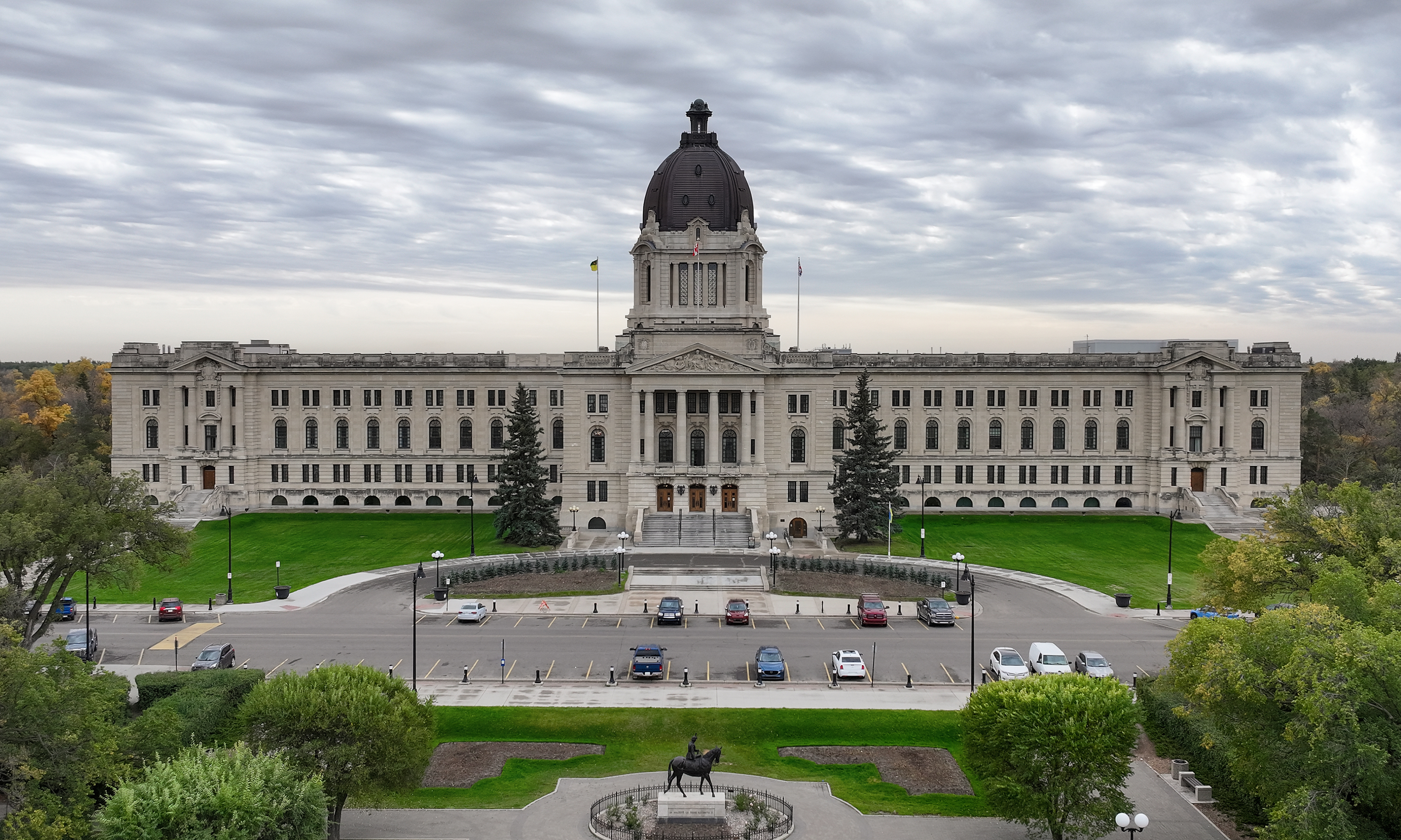
- Exterior view
- Interactive map of the Saskatchewan Legislative Building area

Record height
- Tallest in Regina, Saskatchewan from 1912 to 1927^{[I]}

General information
- Architectural style: Beaux-Arts
- Location: Regina, Saskatchewan, Canada
- Coordinates: 50.4324°N 104.6151°W
- Construction started: August 31, 1908; 117 years ago
- Completed: January 25, 1912; 114 years ago
- Cost: $1.75 million ($45.4 million in 2025 dollars)
- Client: Government of Saskatchewan
- Owner: Government of Saskatchewan

Design and construction
- Architects: Edward and William Sutherland Maxwell

National Historic Site of Canada
- Official name: Saskatchewan Legislative Building and Grounds National Historic Site of Canada
- Designated: 2005

Saskatchewan Heritage Property Act
- Type: Provincial Heritage Property
- Designated: 1978

The Saskatchewan Legislative Building is located in Regina, Saskatchewan, Canada, and houses the Legislative Assembly of Saskatchewan.

== History ==
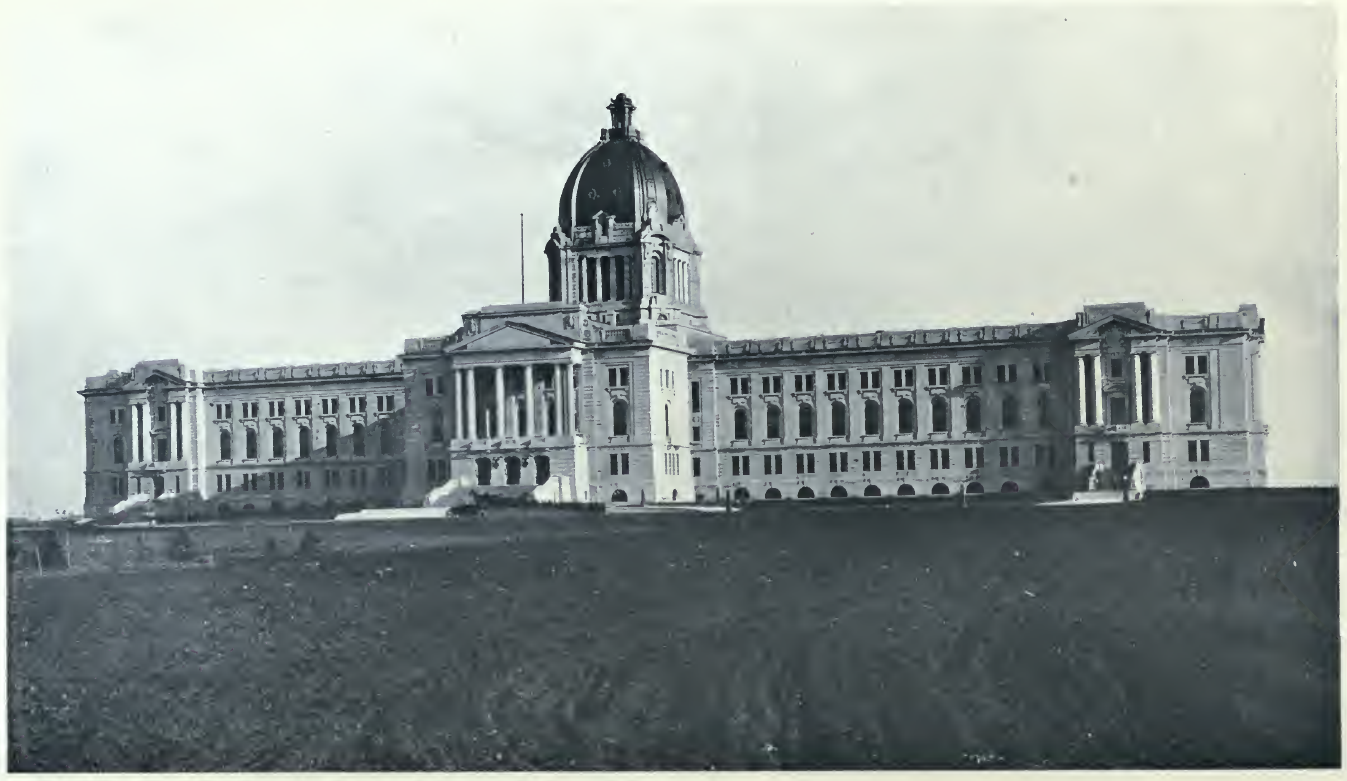
The Saskatchewan Legislative Building in 1915

The Saskatchewan Legislative Building was built between 1908 and 1912 in the Beaux-Arts style to a design by Edward and William Sutherland Maxwell of Montreal. The Maxwells also supervised construction of the building by the Montreal company P. Lyall & Sons, who later built the Centre Block of the federal Parliament Building in Ottawa after the 1866 Parliament Building was destroyed by fire in 1916. Piles began to be drilled for the foundations during the autumn of 1908, and in 1909 the governor general of Canada, the Earl Grey, laid the cornerstone. In 1912, Prince Arthur, Duke of Connaught, by then the serving governor general, inaugurated the building.

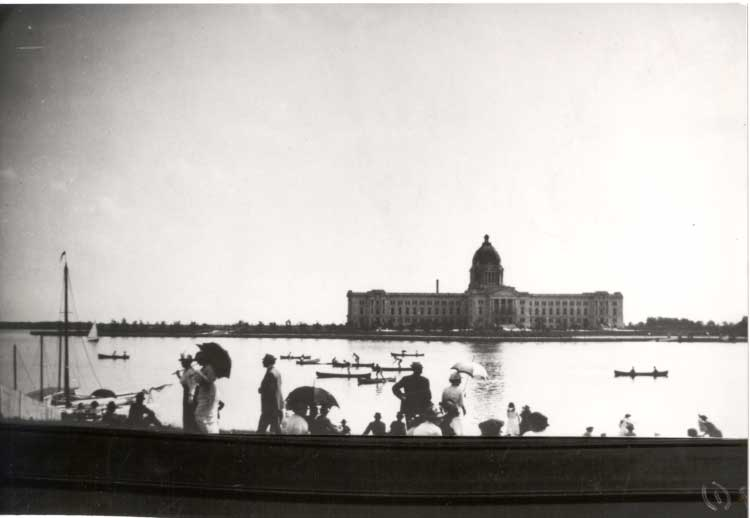
People enjoying a boat race on Wascana Lake north of the Legislative Building circa 1910.

The design contemplates expansion of the building by the addition of wings extending south from the east and west ends and coming together to form a courtyard. The plans originally called for the exterior of the building to be red brick but after construction had begun and red bricks were already on the site, Premier Walter Scott decided that Manitoba Tyndall stone would give the building greater grandeur and the plans were adjusted with the substitution increasing the building cost by $50,000. The total cost of construction came to $1.75 million by the time of its opening in October 1912, ten months after the assembly had begun meeting in the yet-uncompleted building.

In 1965, Clifford Wiens started a major project of renovation and restoration which took some fourteen years to complete. Leslie Jen, associate editor at Canadian Architect, called it a "masterful" renovation.

== Characteristics ==
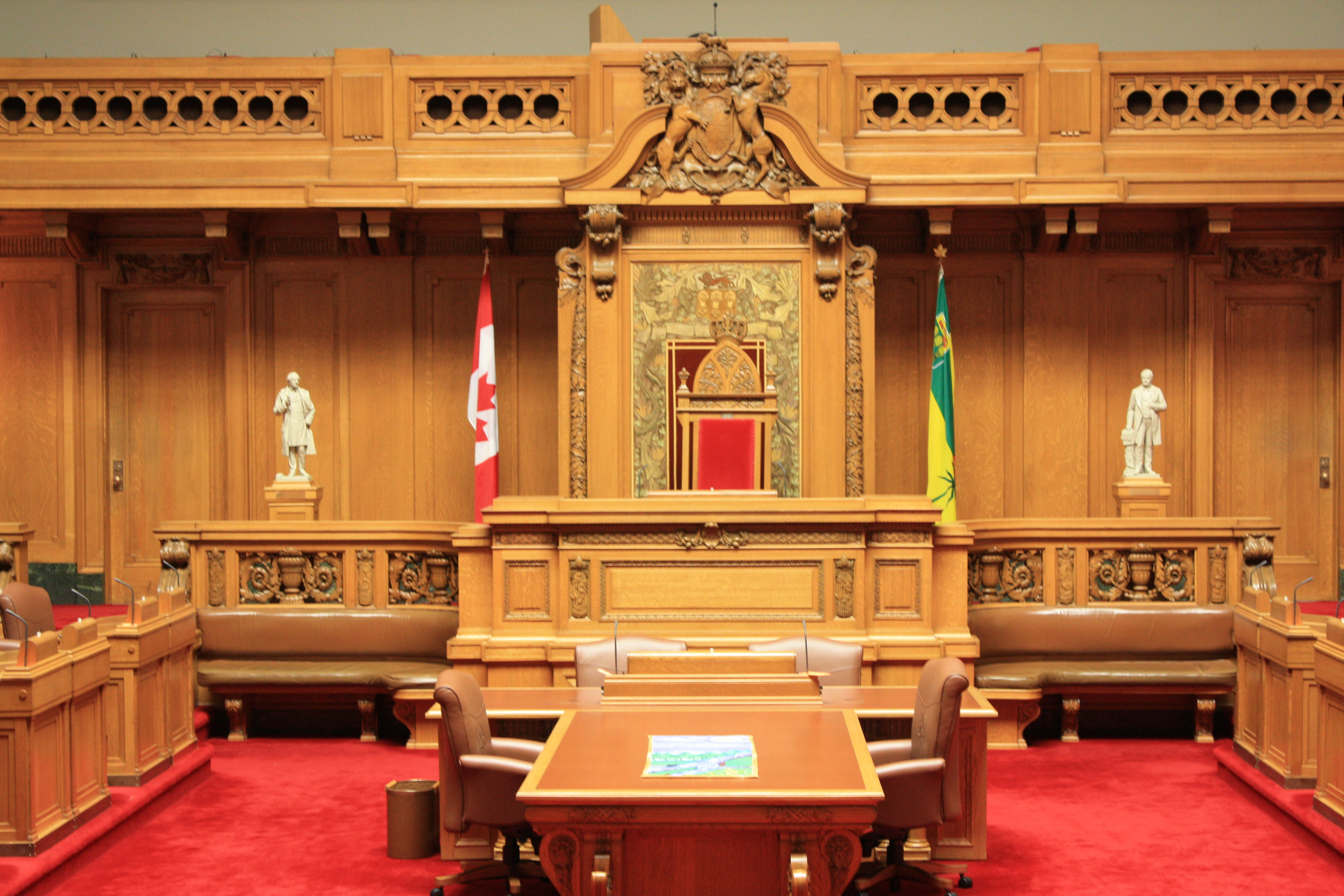
The legislative chamber inside the Saskatchewan Legislative Building with its original red carpet

Diverging from parliamentary tradition, the carpet in the legislative chamber was red until 2012. Traditionally, red carpet is used for houses of unelected members, such as the Senate of Canada, and houses of elected members are given blue or green carpet. Walter Scott preferred red carpet, and for a century the Saskatchewan Legislative Building stood as one of only two in Canada to feature red carpet in its legislative chamber (British Columbia's being the other). The red carpet was replaced by green carpet in the summer of 2012.

Walter Scott anticipated that the building might "for a century yet be credible enough to form the main building on the Capital grounds", the general assumption of the time being that Saskatchewan's population would grow to several million. That century has long since elapsed; the provincial legislative building remains the main building on the "Capital grounds", but indeed, continues to be the most imposing structure in a city smaller than its founders envisioned.

Such planning is evident in the legislative chamber itself, designed to accommodate 125 members. The assembly has never expanded beyond 66 MLAs (and currently has 61). As a result, even after those elections which yielded massive majorities (such as those held in 1982, 1991, and 2011) there has been plenty of space to seat all government members to the speaker's right. The one exception was in 2020 and 2021 to satisfy physical distancing requirements during the COVID-19 pandemic. Desks were spaced in such a manner that a relatively equal number needed to be placed on each side of the Speaker, meaning some government backbenchers sat on the Speaker's left.

The Institute for stained glass in Canada has documented the stained glass at Saskatchewan Legislature.

The Saskatchewan Legislative Building is located at 2405 Legislative Drive, Regina, overlooking Wascana Lake. Free tours of the facility are offered throughout the week.

== Significance ==
The legislative building and its grounds were designated a National Historic Site of Canada in 2005. It is also a Provincial Heritage Property under the Heritage Property Act.

Of historical significance, the table that was used during the meeting of the Fathers of Confederation in Quebec City in 1864 resides in the building's library, albeit with six feet of it removed. Lieutenant-Governor Edgar Dewdney of the North-West Territories brought the table to Regina, which was the capital of the territory at the time. It was used in the offices of the Indian commissioner for Manitoba and the North-West Territories until 1896. Six feet of the table length was removed from the middle so that it could fit within the limited confines of the Prince Edward Building, the temporary home of the Legislative Assembly of Saskatchewan while the Saskatchewan Legislative Building was under construction.

=== Statues at Legislature ===
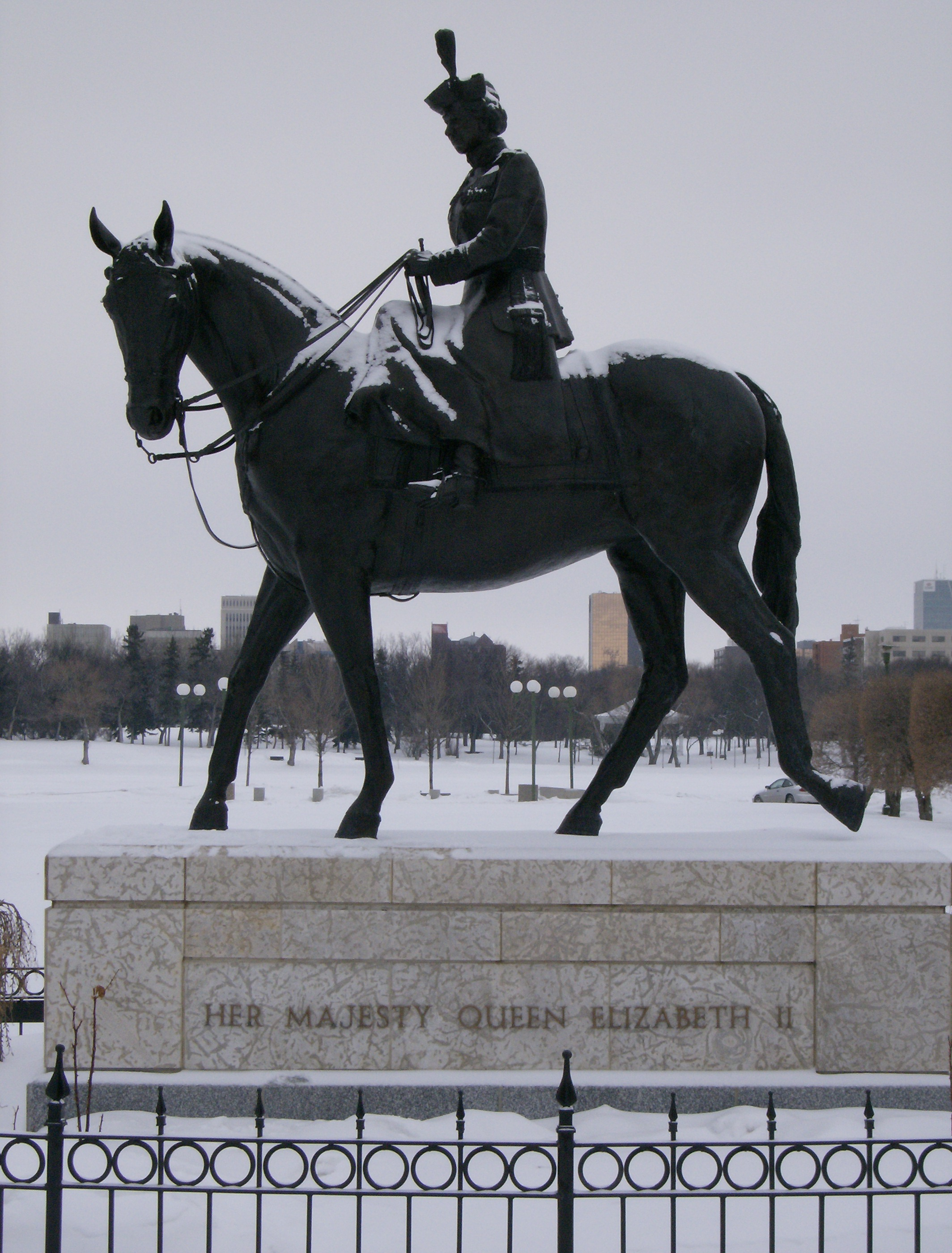
Statue of Queen Elizabeth II north of the building

==== Current statues ====
An equestrian statue of Queen Elizabeth II unveiled in 2005 at the renamed Queen Elizabeth II Gardens stands in front of the legislative building. It was designed by Susan Velder. The statue depicts the Queen atop Burmese, her favourite horse, a gift from the Royal Canadian Mounted Police in 1969. The horse was originally bred in Saskatchewan.

On the eastern side of the building there is a fountain, one of two brought from London's Trafalgar Square, the other having been taken to Ottawa (and now located at Confederation Park). The Peterhead granite fountain was designed by McDonald and Leslie and were relocated before the mid-1930s when Trafalgar Square obtained new fountains designed by Sir Edwin Lutyens. Also located on the legislative building's grounds is the Saskatchewan War Memorial.

==== Removed statue ====
The commissioned statue of Louis Riel by John Cullen Nugent unveiled in 1968 stood on the grounds of the legislature until 1991, when it was removed at the insistence of the Saskatchewan Métis Society and others. Some found the work demoralizing for depicting Louis Riel in a "disrespectful" manner: "gaunt" and semi-nude, in the moment of ultimate Métis humiliation. Others argued that the sculpture was Euro-Canadian appropriation.

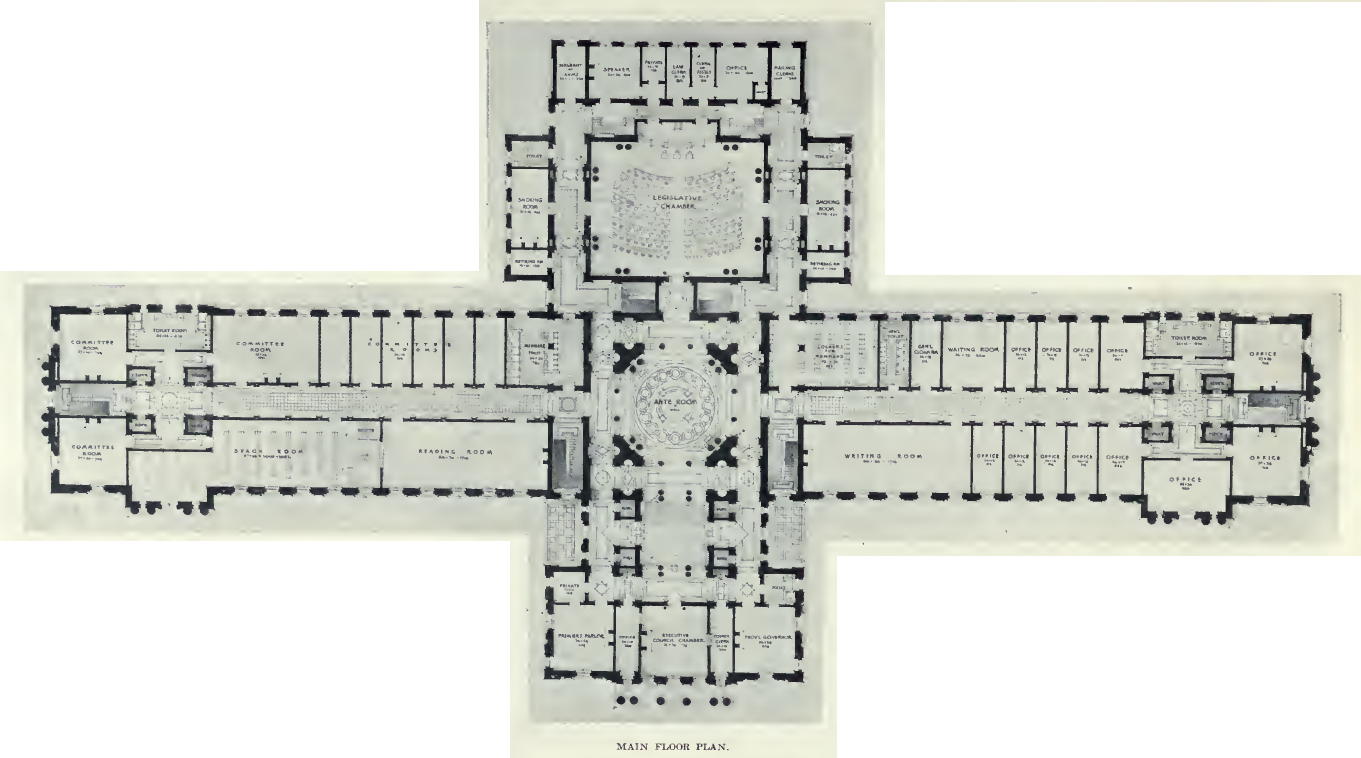
Floor plan

Preceded by	Tallest Building in Regina; 1912-1927; 53 m	Succeeded by Hotel Saskatchewan
