= Lori Blondeau =

Cree / Saulteaux First Nations artist

- Born: 1964 (age 61–62); Regina, Saskatchewan, Canada
- Education: University of Saskatchewan
- Known for: Performance art, sculpture, installation
- Relatives: Edward Poitras (brother); TJ Cuthand (nephew)
- Awards: Governor General's Award (2021)

Lori Blondeau (born 1964) is a Cree/Saulteaux/Métis artist working primarily in performance art, but also in installation and photography. Blondeau is a member of the Gordon First Nation, and is based in Winnipeg, Manitoba.

== Life ==
Blondeau was born in Regina, Saskatchewan in 1964.

As a young artist, she was influenced by the storytelling tradition passed on to her by her mother and grandmother, by her grandfather's woodworking and her mother's quilting, and by her brother, Edward Poitras's art practice.

She holds an MFA (2003). She spent three years apprenticing with Luiseño performance artist James Luna in California in the 1990s.

In 1995, she co-founded Tribe, an artist-run centre geared towards exhibiting the work of contemporary First Nations artists in Canada.

== Work ==
Much of Blondeau's work revolves around the misrepresentation of First Nations women in popular culture and media culture. She regularly works with positive and negative associations attached to the tropes of the Indian Princess and the Squaw, examining how post-colonial imagery impacts the reception of Aboriginal women in urban communities. These personas manifest in photo-based works such as COSMOSQUAW (1996) and Lonely Surfer Squaw (1997), in which Blondeau performs a "re-working of a notorious racist-sexist stereotype."

Significant performance works include The Ballad of Shameman and Betty Daybird (2000), Are You my Mother? (2000), Sisters (2000), and A Moment in the Life of Belle Sauvage (2002).

In addition to her solo practice, Blondeau frequently collaborates with other artists, including performance artist Adrian Stimson. Together, they presented an exhibition entitled Buffalo Boy and Belle Sauvage: Putting the WILD Back into the West at the Mendel Art Gallery in 2004, which paired Stimson as Buffalo Boy with Blondeau's persona Belle Sauvage. The exhibition provided an Indigenous re-thinking of the iconography of cowboy narratives, probing questions of representation. Other collaborations have included works with internationally renowned artists James Luna, and Shelley Niro.

Blondeau has served as a member of the Aboriginal Curatorial Collective.

In October 2015, as part of a symposium, Supercommunity Live hosted by the Remai Modern Art Gallery of Saskatchewan she performed "The Birds, The Bees, The Berries" with Blackfoot artist Adrian Stimpson. The work highlighted responses to environmental threats to bee populations as well as the interconnectedness to life that impacts local and global communities both in natural and urban environments.

=== Selected works and exhibitions ===
- Sovereign Acts II, 2017, Leonard & Bina Ellen Gallery, Montreal, Qc
- Pilgrims of the Wild, 2016, Marvin Francis Media Gallery, Winnipeg, MB

== Tribe Artist Run Centre ==
In September 1995, Blondeau co-founded Tribe: A Centre for the Evolving Aboriginal Media, Visual and Performing Arts Inc., along with Bradlee LaRocque (her partner at the time), April Brass, and Denny Norman. Blondeau currently serves as executive director of Tribe, a roving artist-run centre that focuses on bringing attention to indigenous art and issues by partnering and collaborating with various galleries.

Their most recent project was the final exhibition The Fifth World, curated by Wanda Nanibush, at Saskatoon's Mendel Art Gallery, now the Remai Modern Art Gallery of Saskatchewan. The title "referenced the Hopi prophecy of an impending choice between conflict and harmony, and, quoting writer Leslie Marmon Silko, "a new consciousness... that the earth is shared and finite, and that we are naturally connected to the earth and with one another".

=== The Pass System ===
Blondeau contributed her voice to the documentary film The Pass System by relating, personal, and family stories of the impact that racial segregation of Indigenous communities by the Canadian government which took place over the course of 60 years had on her community. The film also included contributions by celebrated indigenous artists and activists, Alex Janvier and Tantoo Cardinal. Directed by Alex Williams and produced by Tamarack Productions it premiered at the Vancouver International Film Festival in 2015.

== Awards ==
- Governor General's Award in Visual and Media Arts (2021)
