= Saskatchewan War Memorial =

War memorial in Regina, Saskatchewan, Canada

Coordinates: 50°25′59″N 104°37′03″W

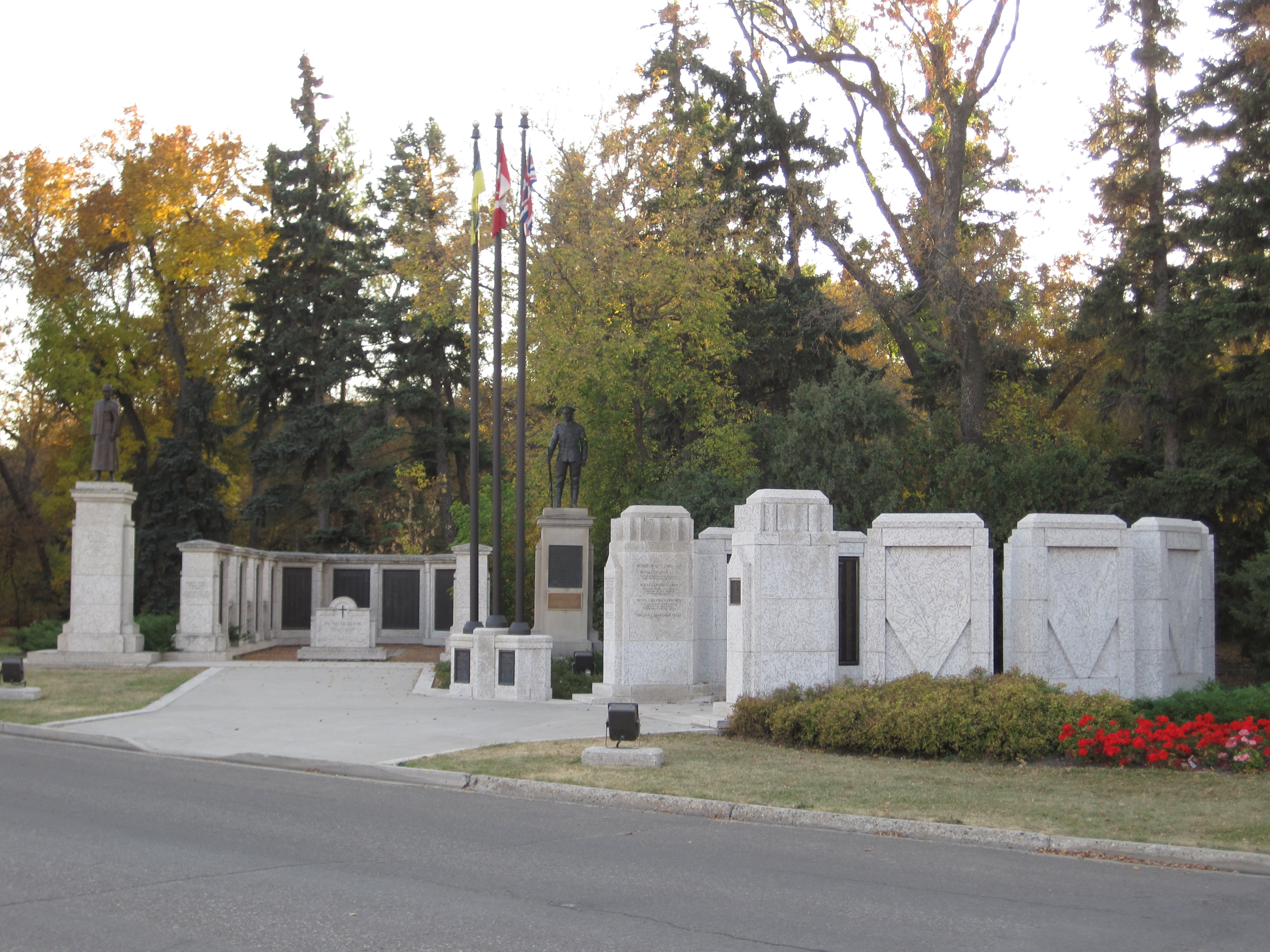
- The memorial in 2012
- Interactive map of Saskatchewan War Memorial
- Location: Wascana Centre, Regina, Saskatchewan, Canada
- Designer: Bill Henderson; Don Begg (nurse statue)
- Beginning date: 1988
- Completion date: 1995 (WWI memorial); 2005 (later addition)
- Dedicated date: 1995 (WWI memorial); 2005 (later addition)
- Dedicated to: Saskatchewan's war dead

The Saskatchewan War Memorial is in Wascana Centre, west of the Saskatchewan Legislative Building in Regina, Saskatchewan, Canada. The war memorial was dedicated in two parts, with the first (dedicated to Saskatchewanians who died in World War I) dedicated in 1995 and the second (dedicated to Saskatchewanians who died in World War II, the Korean War, and other military activities in both wartime and peacetime) in 2005. Both features were designed by architect Bill Henderson. The memorial also features two statues honouring members of the 28th Battalion and nurses who served in World War I, which were erected in 1926 and 2007, respectively. The memorial is the site of annual memorial ceremonies, including Remembrance Day activities and anniversaries of notable military events.

== History ==
=== World War I memorial ===
In 1988, Lloyd Jones, a retired military officer, created a committee to oversee the construction of a war memorial for individuals from the Canadian province of Saskatchewan who had died in World War I. Beginning that year, the committee, which was a registered nonprofit charity organization, began fundraising efforts and worked on selecting a location for the memorial on the grounds of the Saskatchewan Legislative Building in Wascana Centre. Ultimately, the committee selected a site to the west of the legislative building, which was already the site of a memorial statue that had been erected in 1926 by the 28th Battalion Association. The existing statue was incorporated into the overall design of the new memorial. Funds for the memorial were raised via private donations as well as government funding, with several former lieutenant governors of Saskatchewan involved in the fundraising process. Work on the structure lasted from 1988 to 1995. It was designed by Bill Henderson, an architect based in Regina, Saskatchewan. The memorial was officially dedicated on November 10, 1995, in a ceremony overseen by Lieutenant Governor Jack Wiebe.

=== Additions ===
In 2000, the Saskatchewan War Memorial Project committee began planning an addition to the memorial that would honour Saskatchewanians who had died in World War II, the Korean War, and military operations and peacekeeping activities that had occurred after these conflicts. This addition was designed by Henderson, with the groundbreaking performed on May 18, 2005, by Prince Philip, Duke of Edinburgh. The memorial was dedicated later that year on October 2 in a ceremony that was presided over by Lynda Haverstock, the lieutenant governor. The total cost for the memorial, including both the World War I and later addition, was approximately $900,000 (equivalent to $1.3 million in 2023). In 2007, a statue designed by sculptor Don Begg of Studio West Bronze Foundry Ltd. was added to the memorial in dedication to nurses who had participated in World War I.

=== Later history ===
In 2009, the memorial was vandalized by an unknown person who graffitied, among other things, a racial slur directed towards black people on the structure. In response, the government of Saskatchewan announced that they would install a security camera at the memorial.

Since its dedication, the memorial has served as the site of annual memorial services, including those related to Remembrance Day. Other ceremonies have included a 2014 event marking the centenary of the outbreak of World War I, a 2015 memorial for the 75th anniversary of the Battle of Britain, and a 2020 ceremony marking the 75th anniversary of Victory in Europe Day. Remembrance Day ceremonies at the memorial in 2021 involved the Royal Regina Rifles regiment. In April 2024, a statue honouring the regiment was unveiled at the memorial, where it was temporarily on display prior to its shipment to France, where it would be permanently installed in Normandy as part of the 80th anniversary ceremonies for the Normandy landings.

== Design ==
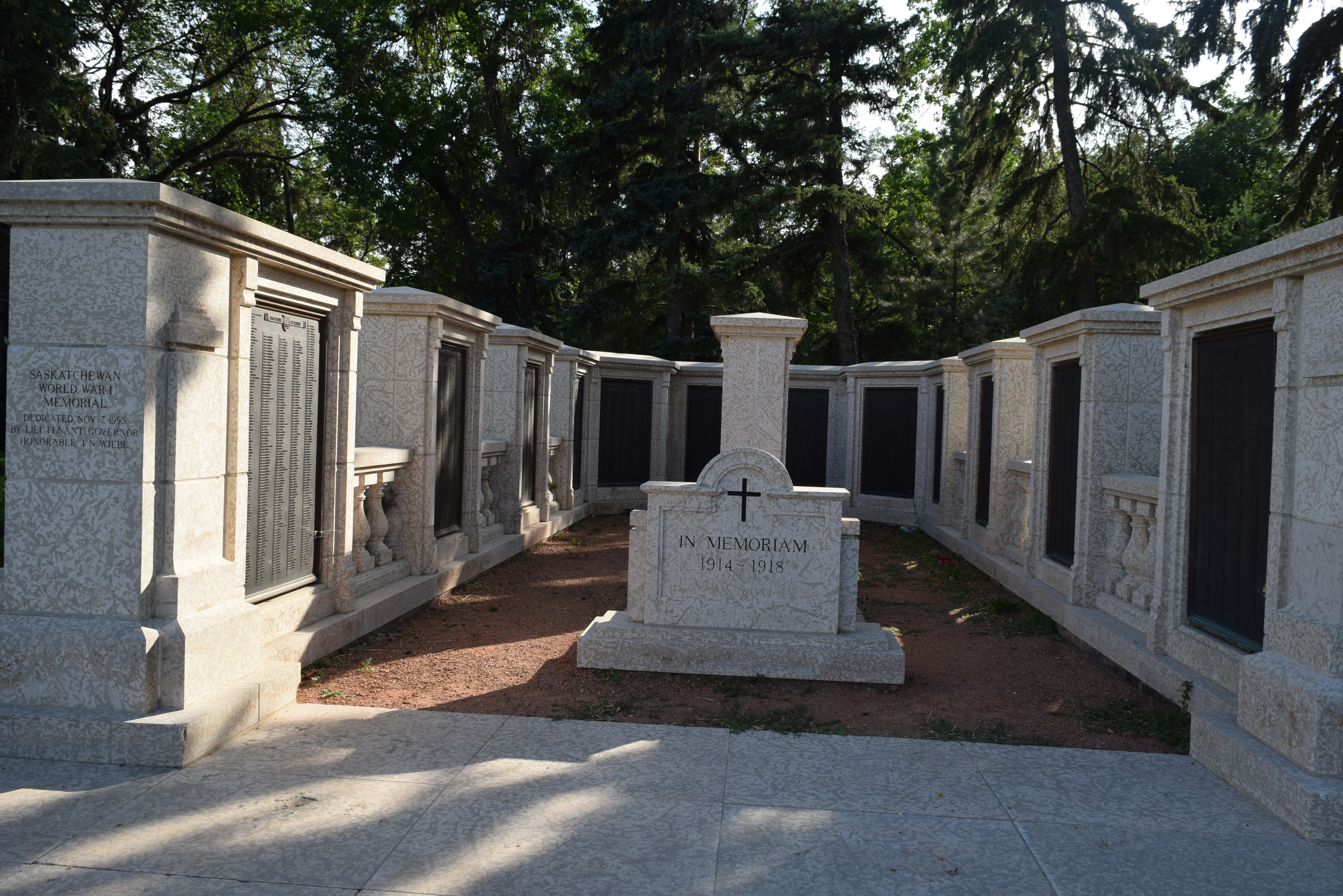
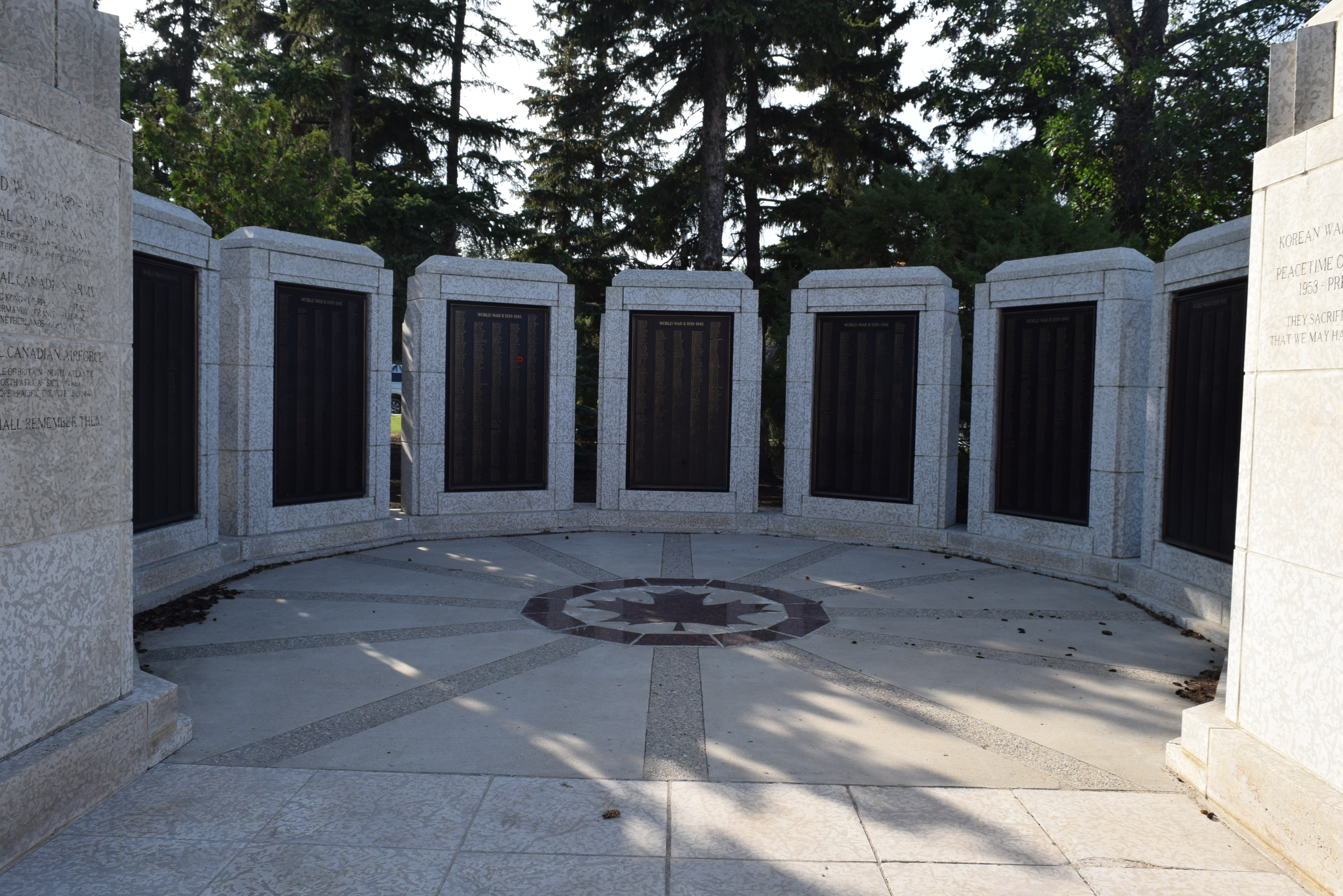
The World War I memorial (left) and later addition

The memorial is on the grounds of the provincial legislative building, in Wascana Centre. It is to the west of the building and near both the Albert Memorial Bridge and Wascana Lake. The World War I memorial is directly north of the later memorial honouring individuals who died in World War II, the Korean War, and later peacekeeping and military activities. The memorial consists of large bronze plaques that bear the names of those who died. Since its opening, the committee has added names of individuals to the memorial. For instance, in 2010, Michelle Lang, a reporter for the Calgary Herald who was killed alongside several soldiers during the War in Afghanistan, was added to the memorial along with two soldiers. As of 2026, the memorial bears the names of roughly 10,000 individuals.

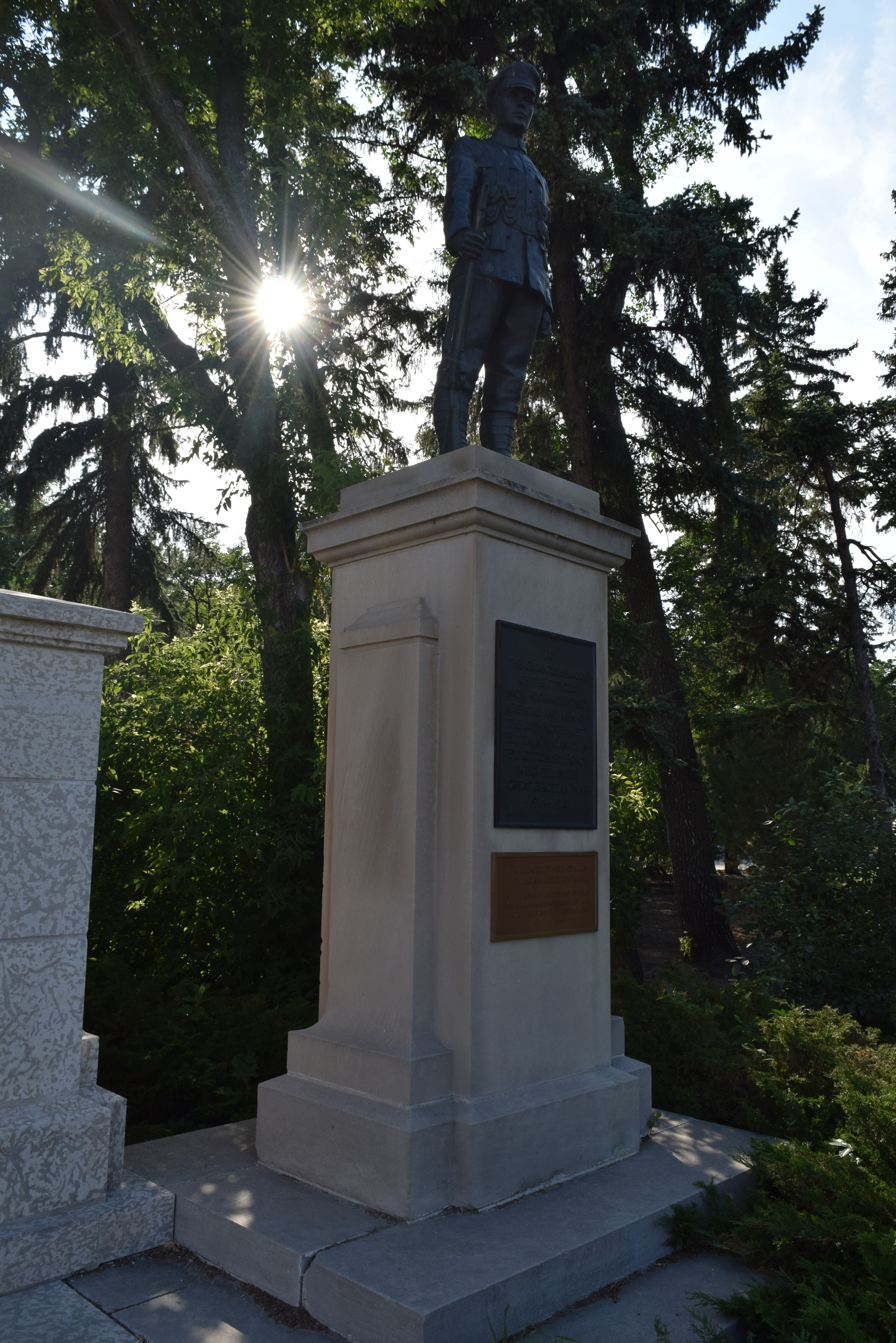
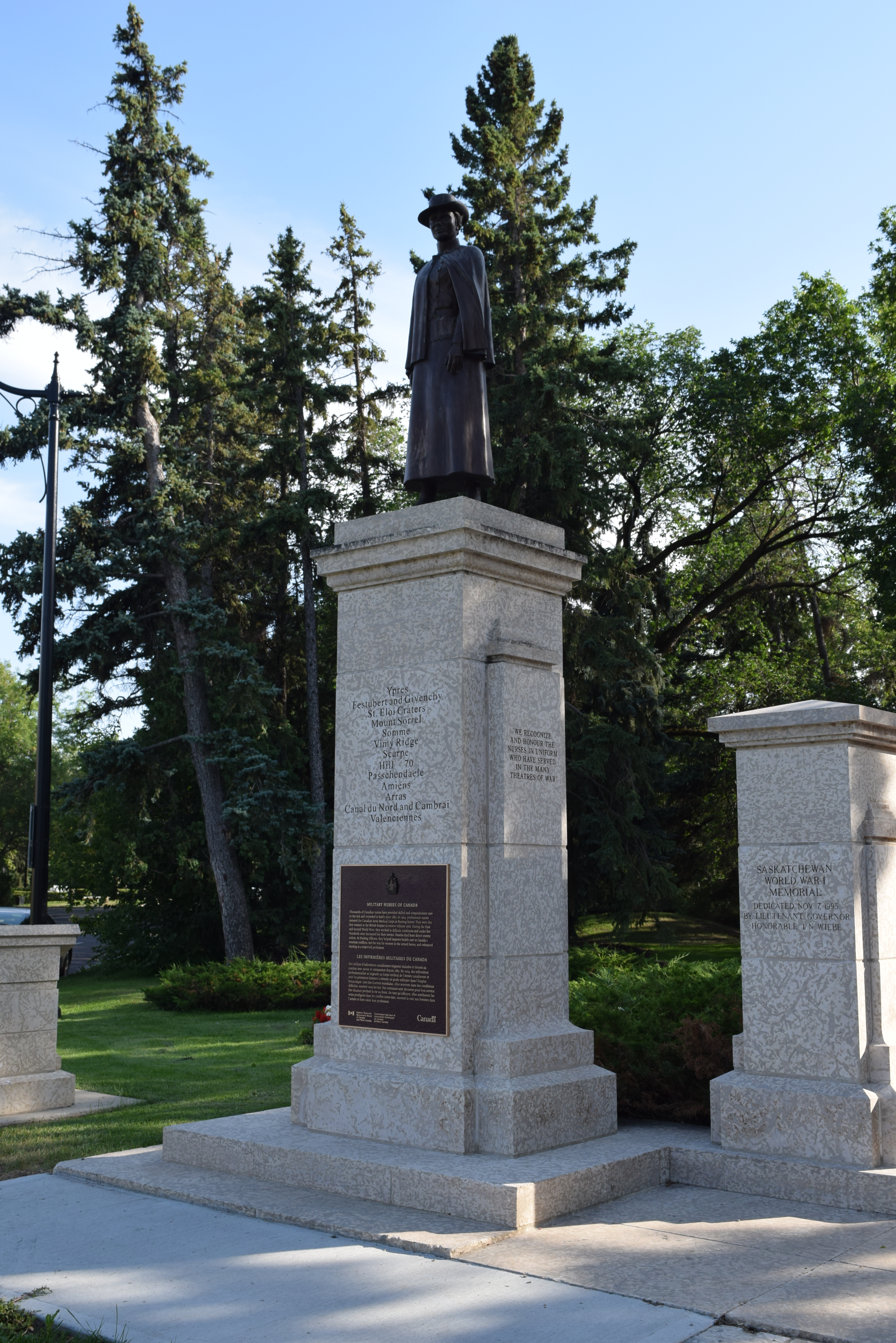
Statues honouring the 28th Battalion (left) and nurses who served during World War I

A nearby stele bears the inscription "In memoriam 1914–1918", while another pillar bears the name of several battles of World War I, reading

- Ypres
- Festubert and Givenchy
- St. Eloi Craters
- Mount Sorrel
- Somme
- Vimy Ridge
- Scarpe
- Hill 70
- Passchendaele
- Amiens
- Arras
- Canal du Nord and Cambrai
- Valenciennes.

There are also two statues located at the memorial, honouring members of the 28th Battalion and nurses who served in World War I. The pedestal for the 28th Battalion statue reads: "To the glorious memory of the officers, non-commissioned officers and men of the 28th (North-West) Battalion, Canadian Expeditionary Force, who fell in the great European war 1914–1918. Perpetuated by 1st Battalion the Regina Regiment. To the memory of the 458 officers, non-commissioned officers, and men who fell serving with the regiment 1939–1945."

== See also ==
- Canadian war memorials
