= Clifford Wiens =

Canadian architect (1926–2020)

Clifford Wiens FRAIC RCA
- Born: 27 April 1926; Glen Kerr area, Saskatchewan, Canada
- Died: 25 January 2020 (aged 93); Vancouver, British Columbia
- Education: Rhode Island School of Design (Note: After first studying painting, agriculture, and machine tooling at three Canadian centres of higher learning.)
- Occupation: Architect
- Spouse: Patricia Elizabeth Leigh (1956)
- Children: 6, including Robin Poitras, Nathan Wiens
- Awards: Massey Medal (3, 1 mention); Prix du XXe siècle; National Design Council of Canada Awards (2); Design Canada Concrete Award; City of Regina Heritage Award; Lieutenant Governor of Saskatchewan Heritage Architecture Excellence Award
- Practice: Clifford Wiens Architects Ltd. (1957-1969 and 1987-1994); Wiens and Associates Ltd. (1970-1979); Wiens Johnstone Architects Ltd. (1979-1987)
- Projects: Poultry Science and Horticultural Building (University of Saskatchewan, 1965); Saskatchewan Legislative Building (restoration and renovation, 1965–1979); National Gallery of Canada (unrealized, 1976)

Clifford Donald Wiens RCA (27 April 1926 – 25 January 2020) was a Canadian writer, poet, designer and architect. Clifford Wiens played a crucial role in the development of corporate modern architecture and the broader Expressionist Movement in postwar Mid-West Canada. Wiens was defined as a poetic architect and his projects reflect this through their communication with both the client and the user. This poetry was best shown in his work on the University of Regina Heating and Cooling Building.

Clifford Wiens has held a few design philosophies throughout his career as an architect and designer. Aside from communication between all parties, the belief he most prioritized was that architecture is all about pleasing the user's eye, mind, and body. Another belief that he held firm was that an architect must design a project that works, firmly believing that flashy buildings that fail to satisfy both the client and the user are failures. He also strongly believed that the architect is an improver and when an architect does things well that the world is improved.

Raised in Glen Kerr, Saskatchewan, Wiens did not originally study architecture. He would instead begin his post secondary schooling with agriculture at the University of Saskatchewan with a full scholarship that came from the Wheat Pool Sponsorship program from the Moose Jaw Technical School. Clifford Wiens would then transfer out of the program, and study painting at the Banff Centre for Continuing Education with AY Jackson. Wiens would then move on from painting due to an inability to find a career in it and study at the Rhode Island School of Design on a full scholarship and graduate in 1954. Upon his completion of the program, Wiens would return to Regina and establish his own architecture firm in 1957.

== Early life ==
=== Childhood ===
Clifford Wiens was born on 27 April 1916, to a Mennonite family that lived on a farm outside of Glen Kerr, Saskatchewan. From an early age, Wiens had an intense interest in design and construction. As a child in the 1930s, he was renowned by all those that knew him for building small detailed cities in the mud after a rainy day. He would help his father construct chicken coops, barbed wire fences, waterwheels and houses for the various farm cats. He would even build working contraptions of his own design from various abandoned pieces of farming equipment. Upon being asked later in life, Wiens stated that building the cat houses was not play; "that was their place, not mine. I was an architect and I did not know it".

His innovative tendencies came from both these construction projects, and his father. His father strongly encouraged self-reliance and often gave Wiens projects that required innovative ways to complete. For instance, Wiens and one of his two brothers would need to drive holes into the ground for fence posts around their property. Instead of simply digging a starter hole and forcing the post down, Wiens would utilize a crowbar to start the hole and then drive the post down. This allowed for the pole to be driven into the ground more effectively be removing that rigid outermost layer of the dirt.

Living on the prairies also offered Wiens an opportunity to develop a strong connection to nature and art during his childhood. Wiens would make his own paint brushes from horse and ox hair to paint whenever he had the opportunity to. He pursued this interest largely in solitude and later in his life during his retirement. His artwork would commonly depict the surrounding landscape of whatever region he was living within and the farm on which he was raised on.

=== Education ===
Clifford Wien's education started in a one-room school located in the downtown area of Glen Kerr. Due to his Mennonite heritage, Wien's first languages were Low and High German. He would eventually learn English by the age of 7.

After graduating high school, Wiens would further his education with an undergraduate degree in agriculture at the University of Saskatchewan in 1943 in Saskatoon. He attended the university under a wheat pool sponsorship program for young farmers and machine tooling, granted by the Moose Jaw Technical School. Eventually, Wiens would decide to leave the agriculture program to pursue one of his passions of painting. He would study painting at the Banff Centre for Continuing Education, now known as the Banff Centre for Arts and Creativity. He would study under the tutelage of A.Y. Jackson, a founder of the Group of Seven. His time studying with Jackson would be relatively short however, as Wiens decided that the lack of job prospects in the field of painting was very daunting.

Wiens would then choose to follow his passion of designing and construction, by continuing his education at the Rhode Island School of Design in 1949. He was accepted into the school on a full scholarship and began studies in Industrial Design with the intention of eventually designing farm equipment. He would ultimately switch to architecture after his first year, however, as the architecture curriculum at the Rhode Island School of Design was heavily influenced by the idea of modernism from the Bauhaus. The concepts that the Bauhaus preached would finally snag Clifford Wiens into a career he would hold most of his remaining working years. Wiens would graduate in 1954 with a full degree in architecture.

== Career ==
=== Early career ===
After finishing his degree, Wiens returned to Saskatchewan to practice. In particular, he travelled to Regina due to the growing positive climate for progressive politics and artistic ideas. This coincided with Regina experiencing a boom in both the agriculture and extractive industries that Wiens wanted to work within.

To start his career, Wiens apprenticed with Stock and Ramsey Architects as an intern designer. He would work with them until 1955 when he would be hired by Joseph Pettick as an intern architect. This is where he would work on his first notable project, contributing modestly to the design, development, and construction documentation for the Saskatchewan Power Corporation Headquarters. More importantly, while he worked with Pettick, he developed close relationships with the Regina Five, who are some of Canada's most critically acclaimed and advanced painters of this time period.

By 1957, Wiens had completed his required apprenticeship time and was finally ready to start practicing as a fully accredited architect. He would start his own firm called Clifford Wiens Architect Ltd. This firm would practice in Regina over the next forty years, and complete more than one hundred projects. With this firm in place, Wiens would begin his work on his first major project that he had the lead position on, the St. Joseph's Church, in Whitewood. This project began in 1958 and was completed in 1959. It was a simple triangular design for both aesthetic reasons, but more so because the slanted roof that reaches the ground would help it protect itself from the congregation of prairie winds that it would face.

=== Middle career ===
Clifford Wiens worked with Clifford Wiens Architects Ltd. from 1957 to 1969 and complete a series of notable projects after the St. Joseph's Church in Whitewood. Some examples of these are the John Nugent Studio (1960), the Round Auditorium, Connaught School and other school auditoria (1960–1961), the Mennonite Brethren Church (1961), and the Heating and Cooling Plant at the University of Regina (1967). These projects were among the main reasons that the firm was so successful. Clifford Wiens Architects Ltd. was published as an exemplar of the remarkable flowering of Canadian Architecture in the wake of Expo 67 because of these projects.

In 1970 Clifford Wiens Architects Ltd would go on to change its name to Wiens and Associates Ltd. due to its increase in size. Wiens and Associates Ltd. would continue to work on a series of noteworthy projects, except now they had the opportunity to expand their operation outside of Regina. Some of these were the Nakusp Hot Springs Resort in Nakusp, British Columbia (1974), and the R.C. Dahl Centre in Swift Current (1974). Wiens and Associates Ltd. would be a temporary name however, as in 1979 Wiens would partner with architect Ross Johnstone and rename the firm Wiens Johnstone Architects Ltd.

Through this partnership, the firm would work on more prominent large scale projects. Some examples of this are the CBC Studios in Regina (1983), Prince Albert City Hall in Prince Albert (1984), and the Administration Building for the University of Saskatchewan in Saskatoon (1987). This partnership would eventually end in 1987 and it was remarked by Leslie Jen in the Canadian Architect that "The province languished for almost two solid decades, architecturally and otherwise." as an indirect result.

Wiens settled into a part time role as a visiting professor and lecturer at several post-secondary institutions across both Canada and the United States during the middle to later years of his career. His lectures took place at the Arizona State University, University of Arizona, Manitoba, Calgary, British Columbia, Saskatchewan, and the North Dakota State University. He visited these Universities throughout his career, but served as a professor at the University of Manitoba in 1968, University of Calgary in 1977, and the University of British Columbia in 1985.

Wiens would continue to practice architecture after the annulment, but it was under Clifford Wiens Architect Ltd. until his retirement in 1994.

=== End of career ===
During Wiens's second stint with Clifford Wiens Architect Ltd. his only major project would be the Auxiliary Building at the Augustana University College (1986). This building provides a space for large art studios, faculty offices and classrooms to the university as it is still utilized to this day.

Clifford Wiens was well known as an indefatigable worker as he practiced design and acted as a consultant for over sixty years. He would have continued work as well if he had not been diagnosed with prostate cancer in 1994. Once Wiens was diagnosed, he closed his practice and moved the Arizona briefly. This trip would last two years, before he would return to Canada and settle to live in Vancouver with his wife. He would continue working as a consultant, mainly for residential buildings during the early years of his retirement. His main focus during this time however, became poetry and philosophy, as Clifford Wiens would write a number of books on both topics. Some of these include Poetry en Prose (2015), Joke, Joke, Jokes, Joke Collection Book (2015), Patricia et al (2016), and All in Verse - Continued Thinking (2018).

== Design philosophies ==
=== Poetry ===
During his career, Wiens was described as a 'Poet Architect' by many, with Abraham Rogatnick coining the term for him. Wiens took this as the compliment it was, as he had always tried to make his buildings poetic, stating "Very early in my life, I was given to writing limericks but I did not start writing more seriously until the end of my architectural career". His buildings would make poetry out of their novel structural techniques and through the evident chain of communication between client, architect and user. In the roof space of his studio on Albert Street in Regina, was a 1/4 inch plate of steel, shaped as a concave arch hanging from a frame of steel pipes was one example of this as its structure was innovative for its time, and the work behind the scenes between all interested parties was immense.

Wiens would also take to writing in his later years, publishing over 17 works. These would range from his life during the Great Depression, to his poetry about the loss of his wife during his retirement.

=== Beliefs ===
Wiens believed in a few simple principles. He has stated that the basic tenets of good design and construction have no changed much over time: that architecture is all about pleasing the eye, mind, and body. While aesthetics are important, the architect should still construct something that will work. He also heavily emphasized the importance of respecting the needs, wants, and resources of the client. He stated, "To do otherwise is to lose credibility and consequently the opportunity to serve again, for without the client the privilege of shaping space does not exist." in the documentary Architect Clifford Wiens Industrial Chic. He strongly believed that the client needs to be the boss of any project.

Wiens was a revolutionary architect during the post-World War II era in Canada, and thus had a key role to play in developing an architectural style for Mid-Western Canada. His style of choice was Modernism. He believed it to be a strong building block to allow future generations to expand upon it, while not forgetting the past principles of architecture. In the documentary on one of his projects, Architect Clifford Wiens Industrial Chic, Wiens states that Modernism is not isolated from the principles of classical architecture: "The way the building works, the way the building is situated, and the way it expresses the essence of modern materials," is what makes a building a part of the modernist movement. These concepts are shared with all buildings that were constructed with a more classical design.

Wiens was also a firm believer that an architect's job is to improve what they touch. Wiens would constantly be trying to take his various designs for both buildings and agricultural projects and enhance them wherever possible. A saying he would often use was "When architects do things well, it left the world a little bit improved,".

== Personal life ==
=== Relationships ===
Wiens was only married once in his life, and that was to Patricia Elizabeth Leigh. She graduated in the Fine arts at the University of Manitoba in 1952. Like Wiens, she loved nature, and its connection to the human spirit. She was particularly fond of pottery, and would teach it for her career. Mrs. Wiens was considered an intellectual and creative partner to Clifford Wiens. She acquired a fine arts degree from the University of Manitoba, and worked as an assistant on the Saskatchewan Arts Board. They were married in 1956 and remained married until her death in 2018. During their sixty-two years of marriage, they had six children and twelve grandchildren. Due to both Clifford and Patricia Wiens being particularly passionate about nature and art, all of their children pursued careers in creative professions, such as cuisine, jewelry, and design. For example, Clifford Wiens's second child Robin Poitras, is a co-founder of the New Dance Horizons in Regina. She has received the Saskatchewan Lieutenant Government Lifetime Achievement in the Arts award for her performances with New Dance Horizons.

== Legacy ==
Clifford Wiens has over 5,200 architectural drawings, 100 photographs, 120 presentation panels, and 19 slides in an architectural archive at the University of Regina. There pieces have been created over his architectural career between 1953 and 1990. He is also well known for his poetry and architecture books.

Unfortunately, there has been a nearly unanimous failure to offer sufficient upkeep of most of Wiens's private projects. An example of this would be the Silton Chapel which was found to be coming apart due to moisture rotting the wooden beams in 2015.

== Professional affiliations ==
- Royal Architectural Institute of Canada • Member, education and research committees; cited Fellow in 1974
- Royal Canadian Academy of Arts • Associate Member
- National Design Council of Canada (Department of Industry) • Member
- Canadian Department of Public Works' Advisory Committee on Art for Public Buildings, 1974–1981
- Task Force on Mid-Canada Development • Member
- Saskatchewan Association of Architects • Council Member, 1967–1973 • President, 1970 • Life Member, 2010
  - Regina Chapter • President, 1960–1969

== Exhibitions ==
- Canadian Federation of Artists Exhibition • 1964, 1969, 1970
- Art Gallery of Ontario • The Architecture of Clifford Wiens, 1967
- Mendel Art Gallery and other Western Canada venues • Telling Details: The Architecture of Clifford Wiens
  - Mendel Art Gallery, Saskatoon, 25 November 2005 – 15 January 2006
  - Cambridge Art Galleries, Cambridge, Ontario, 29 August-5 November 2006
  - Plug in Institute of Contemporary Art, Winnipeg, 2 March-27 April 2007
  - Mackenzie Art Gallery, Regina, 26 May-26 August 2007
  - Charles H. Scott Gallery, 4 June-13 July 2008

== List of prominent works ==
- St. Joseph's Church, Whitewood (1959)
- John Nugent Studio, Lumsden (1960)
- Round Auditorium, Connaught School and other School Auditoria, Regina (1960–1961)
- Mennonite Brethren Church, Regina (1961)
- Lakeshore Residence, near Lebret (1962)
- Maple Creek Camp and Picnic Grounds Administration Building (1965)
- Church of Our Lady, Moose Jaw (1966)
- Heating and Cooling Plant, University of Regina (1967)
- Silton Chapel, near Silton (1969)
- Spiral Teepee Picnic Shelters (1970)
- Nakusp Hot Springs Resort (1974)
- R.C. Dahl Centre, Swift Current (1974)
- CBC Studios, Regina (1983)
- Prince Albert City Hall, Prince Albert (1984)
- Administration Building, University of Saskatchewan (1987)
- Auxiliary Building, Augustana University College (1986)

== Buildings ==
- St Joseph Catholic Church
- John Nugent Studio
- Round Auditorium (Connaught School)
- Mennonite Brethren Church
- Lakeshore Residence
- Our Lady Catholic Church
- Heating and Cooling Plant
- Maple Creek Campground
- Silton Chapel
- Spiral Teepee Picnic Shelters
- Nakusp Hot Springs Resort
- R.C. Dahl Centre
- CBC Studios, Regina
- Prince Albert City Hall
- Administrative Building (University of Saskatchewan)
- Auxiliary Building (Augustana University College)
- Poultry Science and Horticultural Building (University of Saskatchewan, 1965)
- Saskatchewan Legislative Building (restoration and renovation, 1965–1979)
- National Gallery of Canada (unrealized, 1976)

== Select bibliography ==
Monographs

- Telling Details: The Architecture of Clifford Wiens. Saskatoon: Mendel Art Gallery, 2009. Published in conjunction with the exhibition curated by Trevor Boddy.
- Project By Project: Architectural/Memoirs, Vancouver: Wiens Publishing House, 2012.
- Rewind and Fast Forward. Vancouver: Wiens Publishing House, 2004.

Essay

- "Prairie Architecture Examined: Regionalism and Reality." The Canadian Architect 24, no. 10 (October 1979)
