= Ruth Cuthand =

Canadian artist

- Born: Shirley Ruth Cuthand; 1954 (age 71–72); Treaty 6 Land near Prince Albert, Saskatchewan, Canada
- Education: University of Saskatchewan
- Known for: multimedia artist, beadwork artist, graphic artist
- Website: http://www.ruthcuthand.ca/

Ruth Cuthand (born 1954) is a Canadian artist of Plains Cree and Scots ancestry. She is considered an influential feminist artist of the Canadian prairies, and is lauded for her interpretation of racism and colonialism. Her work challenges mainstream perspectives on colonialism and the relationships between settlers and Indigenous people in a practice marked by political invective, humour, and a deliberate crudeness of style.

== Early life ==
Born on Treaty 6 Land, near Prince Albert, Saskatchewan, Cuthand is a member of Little Pine First Nation, but spent most of her childhood in Cardston, Alberta near the Blood Reserve, where she met artist Gerald Tailfeathers at the age of 8, which compelled her to pursue a career as an artist.

Cuthand earned a BFA from the University of Saskatchewan in 1983, and a MFA, also from the University of Saskatchewan in 1992. In the period between her degree programs, Cuthand did some post-graduate work at the University of Montana in 1985. During her education, she worked in printmaking, but later switched to painting. Cuthand taught art and art history at the First Nations University of Canada, and University of Regina. She also taught a variety of studio courses for over twenty years.

== Career ==
In 1990, Cuthand's first solo exhibition, titled S. Ruth Cuthand: The Trace of Ghost Dance, was held at the MacKenzie Art Gallery in Regina, Saskatchewan. The show featured painted shirts and dresses that were grounded in a movement among Plains First Nations groups in the 19th century, known as the ghost dance religion. Cuthand used them to express non-violent resistance to imperialism.

Her travelling retrospective exhibition, BACK TALK (works 1983–2009), was exhibited at galleries across Canada, including the Mendel Art Gallery (Saskatoon) in 2011, the Confederation Centre Art Gallery (Charlottetown, PEI) in 2012, Mount Saint Vincent Gallery (Halifax, NS) and at Plug in ICA (Winnipeg) in 2014. The bilingual (Cree/English) exhibition catalogue that accompanied the exhibition was shortlisted for the 2013 Saskatchewan Book Awards, featuring essays by contemporary curators, including Joan Borsa and Lee-Ann Martin. In 2016, she was part of a group show at Wanuskewin Heritage Park, Cardston, Alberta, 1959–1967.

Since 2006, Cuthand has been adding pieces to a series titled Trading. This series examines pandemics, disease, and colonialism using colourful beaded depictions of microscope images of bacteria and viruses such as influenza, bubonic plague, measles, smallpox, typhus, cholera, scarlet fever, diphtheria, chicken pox, yellow fever, and whooping cough. Cuthand pushed her practice in a new direction by expanding on concepts found in her Trading Series (2009). The glass-bead pathogens used in that series have led to a new body of work related to unsafe water conditions found on First Nations reserves. Don't Drink, Don't Breathe, at the Mann Art Gallery in Prince Albert, SK in 2015 brings together an installation of beaded pathogens found in water supplies that the artist suspends in glasses filled with resin that give the impression of glasses of water. An exhibition in March 2016 in Saskatoon further articulates this artistic direction that, like her earlier body of work, challenges colonial issues in Canada. A version of this work is in the collection of the Art Gallery of Ontario. In 2019 her beaded work was included in ÀbadakoneIContinuous FireIFeu continuel, an exhibition of contemporary international indigenous art at the National Gallery of Canada (Ottawa).

After the Trading series, Cuthand explored similar themes in her two following collections: Reserving and Surviving. In 2020 she added several versions of the work Surviving COVID-19 to the collection, some which features beads affixed to a white face mask representing the microscopic images of the COVID-19 virus. The pieces build on previous themes including the impact of pandemics and disease on Indigenous communities.

Cuthand lives and works in Saskatoon, Saskatchewan.

== Themes ==
Cuthand incorporates intense and provocative pieces exploring themes of colonialism, stereotyping, residential school abuse, intergenerational trauma, and institutionalized racism. One example of this is her work Trading, which uses bead work to depict the viruses carried by European traders into First Nation communities. She does not shy away from the colonialist and racist themes in her work, quoted in Windspeaker in 1993: "Being an Indian, you're stereotyped. We're sort of these hard-working women who are usually fat and we're angry. So I stereotyped the white liberals as women with long pointy noses, pointy shoes and long black fingernails."

In 2021 exhibition "Beads in the blood," some of Cuthand's works focus on mental health. She uses glow in the dark beads representing brain scans of various mental illness including PTSD, which is tied to the intergenerational trauma experienced by Indigenous communities.

== Awards ==
Cuthand was honoured with the Saskatchewan Artist Award at the Lieutenant Governor's Arts Awards in 2013. In 2016, she was honoured as a 2016 Arts & Science Alumni of Influence at the University of Saskatchewan. In 2020, she was awarded a Governor General's Award in Visual and Media Arts. In 2021, she received an honorary doctorate from OCAD.

== Exhibitions ==
She has been presented in group and solo exhibitions at a number of galleries, including at the Mendel Art Gallery (Saskatoon), Thunder Bay Art Gallery (Thunder Bay), and AKA Gallery (Saskatoon), and the National Gallery of Canada (Ottawa). Her work is represented in collections at the MacKenzie Art Gallery (Regina), Mendel Art Gallery (Saskatoon), Laurentian University Museum, the Saskatchewan Arts Board, the Indigenous Art Centre at the Department of Indian and Northern Affairs (Ottawa), and the National Gallery of Canada (Ottawa). Cuthand has also curated works for several galleries across Canada, including Mediating Violence for Tribe, Inc. and AKA Gallery in 2002, and served on peer juries from the Canada Council and the Saskatchewan Arts Board.

=== Solo exhibitions ===
- 1990 – Traces of the Ghost Dance, Artists with Their Work, MacKenzie Art Gallery, Regina, Saskatchewan
- 1990 – Misuse is Abuse, Mendel Art Gallery, Saskatoon, Saskatchewan
- 1992 – Misuse is Abuse II, MFA Exhibition, University of Saskatchewan, Saskatoon, Saskatchewan
- 1993 – Location/Dislocation, Mendel Art Gallery, Saskatoon, Saskatchewan
- 1999 – Indian Portraits: Late 20th Century, Wanuskewin Heritage Park Museum, Saskatoon, Saskatchewan
- 2010 – Dis-Ease, Red Shift Gallery, Saskatoon, Saskatchewan
- 2011 – Dis-Ease, Truck Gallery, Calgary, Alberta
- 2011 – BACK TALK: Ruth Cuthand (works 1983–2009), Mendel Art Gallery, Saskatoon, Saskatchewan
- 2012 – BACK TALK: Ruth Cuthand (works 1983–2009), Confederation Centre Art Gallery, Charlottetown, Prince Edward Island
- 2012 – BACK TALK: Ruth Cuthand (works 1983–2009), Mount Saint Vincent University, Halifax, Nova Scotia
- 2013 – BACK TALK: Ruth Cuthand (works 1983–2009), Thunder Bay Art Gallery, Thunder Bay, Ontario
- 2014 – BACK TALK: Ruth Cuthand (works 1983–2009), Plug In ICA, Winnipeg, Manitoba
- 2015 – Don't Drink, Don't Breathe, Mann Art Gallery, Prince Albert, Saskatchewan
- 2016 – Don't Breathe, Don't Drink, dc3 Art Projects, Edmonton, Alberta
- 2016 – Cardston, Alberta, 1959–1967, Wanuskewin Heritage Park, Saskatoon, Saskatchewan
- 2019 – Artist in Focus, Remai Art Gallery, Saskatoon, Saskatchewan.
- 2021 – Beads in the blood: Ruth Cuthand, a Survey, University of Saskatchewan, College Art Gallery, Saskatoon, Saskatchewan. Curated by Felicia Gay.

== Sources ==
- "S. Ruth Cuthand" Art Placement. Retrieved 2016-02-26.
- "Ruth Cuthand" Canadian Art. Retrieved 2016-02-26.
