= Michael W. Higgins =

Canadian academic and writer (born 1948)

President and Vice-Chancellor of St. Jerome's College
- In office 1999–2006

President and Vice-Chancellor of St. Thomas University (New Brunswick)
- In office 2006–2009
- Succeeded by: Dennis Cochrane

President of Corpus Christi College (Vancouver)
- Incumbent
- Assumed office 2020

Personal details
- Born: October 24, 1948
- Spouse: Krystyna Higgins

Michael William Higgins (born October 24, 1948) is a Canadian academic and writer. He was the interim principal of St. Mark's College and president of Corpus Christi College from 2020 to 2023.

== Personal ==
Born in Toronto in 1948, Higgins attended St. Thomas Aquinas School for his primary education, and received his secondary education from the Vaughan Road Collegiate Institute, where Higgins is now on the school's "Hall of Fame".

Higgins earned his Bachelor of Arts degree magna cum laude in English and Philosophy from St. Francis Xavier University (1970), a Masters of Arts in English from York University (1971), a Bachelor of Education (Theatre Arts specialization) from the University of Toronto (1974), a PhD from York University (1979) with a thesis entitled Thomas Merton — the Silent-Speaking Poet: A Study of his Poetry, a Doctor of Humane Letters (DHL) from Sacred Heart University (2008), and an honorary Laws Doctor (LL.D) from the University of Waterloo (2013).

== Professional ==
Higgins also did graduate work in Theology at the University of St. Michael's College (Toronto), later teaching English and Religious Studies (1974–1982 and 1981–1983) and English (1979–1982), at both the College School and the University College, before moving to St. Jerome's College in Waterloo, Ontario (1982–2006). There, from 1989 to 1995 he served as Associate Dean, before becoming Academic Dean and Vice-President (1995–1999) and President and Vice-Chancellor (1999–2006). In 2006 Higgins became President and Vice-Chancellor, as well as Professor of English and Religious Studies at St. Thomas University in Fredericton, New Brunswick. In August 2009, eighteen months after a controversial lockout (before the faculty union had taken a strike vote) and subsequent strike, Higgins announced his resignation as President of St. Thomas, effective December 31, 2009. Four days later, on January 4, 2010, he commenced as a Visiting Senior Executive in Residence at Sacred Heart University (SHU). From 2010–2017, Higgins served as Vice President for SHU's Mission and Catholic Identity department. In this role Higgins was responsible for leading initiatives that preserve, promote and integrate Catholic mission, vision and values throughout the University. He directed such programs at the Spidlik Center for Ecumenical Understanding as well as the new and developing Institute for Vatican II Studies. In 2012 Higgins was a Senior Fellow at Massey College, University of Toronto. Higgins became the Distinguished Professor of Catholic Thought at SHU (2017-2020) before accepting the positions of Principal of St. Mark's College at UBC and President of Corpus Christi College (2020–2022). He is a Professor Emeritus of SHU, and an Affiliate Professor of Graduate Studies at the San Antonio Oblate School of Theology. He is also the Basilian Distinguished Fellow of Contemporary Catholic Thought, University of St. Michael's College, University ofToronto (2022–present).

Higgins has been a columnist for The Toronto Star, The Record (Kitchener-Waterloo), The Catholic Register, The Telegraph-Journal (New Brunswick), The Irish Catholic (Dublin), and is a regular contributor to The Globe and Mail, Commonweal (New York), The Tablet (London, England) and The Literary Review of Canada. He has been a documentarian/script writer for the CBC's Ideas, Open Circuit, Celebration, and a regular commentator and analyst for CTV, TVOntario, and CBC networks, specifically with Morningside and Sunday Edition. He is a Vatican affairs analyst for CTV. Higgins' editorial responsibilities include book review editor for the Catholic New Times (1981–1991), poetry editor for The New Quarterly (1983–1986), advisory editor for Gamut International and Arts and Media Editor for Grail: An Ecumenical Journal (1985–1987), editor for Grail: An Ecumenical Journal (1987–1998), Advisory Board member for the University of Waterloo Magazine (1999–2006), and editor of the John English Symposium on Ignatian Spirituality Interviews (July 19–21, 1999).

In 2009, Higgins spoke out about the lifting of the excommunications of the bishops of the Society of Saint Pius X, saying bishop Richard Williamson must apologize for his negationist views or be expelled from the Roman Catholic Church. As a radio documentarian for the CBC, he has prepared more than 60 one-hour scripts for Ideas, Celebration, and Testament, and has been a regular contributor to Morningside, This Morning, Sunday Edition, as well as to CTV's Canada AM and to TV Ontario's Studio 2 and Agenda. Several of Higgins' programmes have been nominated and short-listed for public-broadcasting awards. Higgins was the main consultant for John McGreevy's six-hour television series, Sir Peter Ustinov's 'Inside the Vatican', and for John Bailey's film version of Ron Hansen's novel, Mariette in Ecstasy. He has also served as a consultant for CBC's Man Alive, and was a writer and consultant for Knopf Canada on the publishing of Pope John Paul II's Crossing the Threshold of Hope.

Higgins was working on a CBC documentary series, when, in April 2010, it was announced that he would serve as biographer of Henri J.M. Nouwen, the only biographical account of Nouwen's life and works to be authorized by Nouwen's Legacy Trust.

In November 2010, Higgins released Suffer the Children Unto Me: An Open Inquiry into the Clerical Sex Abuse Scandal, which was co-authored with Peter Kavanagh. The book deals with the Roman Catholic Church's sexual abuse crisis in Canada and the media. The authors describe it as "an exploration of the modern sexual abuse scandal from a number of perspectives". The authors go beyond simply chronicling the issue and its players. They also carefully scrutinize how the media have both reported on and influenced the crisis. In June 2011 The Catholic Journalist, the newspaper of the Catholic Press Association of the United States & Canada, awarded the book first place in their category for gender issues. With the award the CPA stated that "The gift of this book is its clear, story-telling language and its richly nuanced entry into deeply troubling but necessary questions that involve media coverage, social mores, systemic and cultural factors, legal procedures, theological understandings, and institutional demands."

== Trudeau's Spirituality ==
Higgins has been noted for his research on the spirituality of former Canadian Prime Minister Pierre Elliott Trudeau. Trudeau was a Roman Catholic and attended church throughout his life. While mostly private about his beliefs, he made it clear that he was a believer. Trudeau maintained, however, that he preferred to impose constraints on himself rather than have them imposed from the outside. In this sense, he believed he was more like a Protestant than a Catholic of the era in which he was schooled. Higgins found that Trudeau's spirituality incorporated elements of three Catholic traditions. The first of these was the Jesuits who provided his education up to the college level. Trudeau frequently displayed the logic and love of argument consistent with that tradition. A second great spiritual influence in Trudeau's life was Dominican. A third spiritual influence in Trudeau's spirituality was a contemplative aspect acquired from his association with the Benedictine tradition.

Trudeau was convinced of the centrality of meditation in a life fully lived, according to Higgins. He took retreats at Saint-Benoît-du-Lac, Quebec and regularly attended Hours and the Eucharist at Montreal's Benedictine community. Trudeau's spirituality, according to Higgins, "suffused, anchored, and directed his inner life. In no small part, it defined him."

== Recognition ==
Among his awards are an Ontario Arts Council Award (1988 and 2001), Faith Today's God Uses Ink Award for Non-fiction (1999), the Queen's Jubilee Medal for Leadership and recognition as a 'notable alumnus' of St. Michael's College School. He has been listed in the Canadian Who's Who (1997), was named among TVO's 'Top Ten Lecturers of Ontario' (2005) and was a Senior Fellow at Massey College at the University of Toronto in 2012. His CBC Ideas series "Genius Born of Anguish" won the New York Festivals' gold medal in 2013.

He has won several book awards from the Catholic Press Association (first prize for Suffer the Children in 2011, second prize for Genius Born of Anguish in 2013 and Impressively Free in 2020), and from the Association of Catholic Publishers (first prize for Genius Born of Anguish in 2013). Higgins was awarded an Honorary Doctorate of Human Letters from Sacred Heart University (2008), and an Honorary Doctorate of Laws from the University of Waterloo (2013). He had been nominated by the publisher for the Governor-General's Award in non-fiction (1990, My Father's Business). With co-author Kevin Burns, Higgins received the second place award for sacraments for Impressively Free: Henri Nouwen as a Model for a Reformed Priesthood from the Catholic Press Association's 2020 Catholic Media Conference. In 2020, Dr. Higgins received the Distinguished Alumnus Award from his alma mater St. Francis Xavier University, Antigonish, Nova Scotia.

Higgins was named an Honorary Citizen of the Commune di Grimaldi, Provincia de Conzena, Italia in the spring of 2003, and inducted as an Honorary Member of the Honour Society of Jesuit Institutions of Higher Education Alpha Sigma Nu in 2003. Dr. Higgins was Knighted by Aloysius Cardinal Ambrozic as a member of the Equestrian Order of the Holy Sepulchre at St. Michael's Cathedral in September 2004, and was promoted to the rank of Knight Commander in October 2008.

== Publications ==
Higgins is the author or editor of over a dozen books, including:

- The Church Needs the Laity: The Wisdom of John Henry Newman, Paulist Press, 2021.
- Impressively Free: Henri Nouwen as a Model for a Reformed Priesthood, co-authored with Kevin Burns, Paulist/Novalis, 2019.
- Introducing John Moriarty in His Own Words, co-edited with Sean Aherne, with introduction by Michael W. Higgins, Dublin: Lilliput Press, 2019.
- "Foreword," Stray Devotions: Prayers, Poems and Intercessions from the Bench, by James Clarke. Toronto: Novalis, 2018.
- Jean Vanier: Logician of the Heart, Liturgical Press/Novalis, 2016.
- The Unquiet Monk: Thomas Merton's Questing Faith, New York: Orbis, 2015.
- Faith and Literature Matters, edited with introduction by Michael W. Higgins, Toronto: Novalis, 2014.
- Thomas Merton: Faithful Visionary, Collegeville: Liturgical Press, 2014. (Published in German by Verlag Katholisches Bibelwerk in 2015 and scheduled to appear in Italian by Libreria Editrice Vaticana in 2017.)
- Genius Born of Anguish: The Life and Legacy of Henri Nouwen, by Michael W. Higgins and Kevin Burns, Ottawa/New York: Paulist/Novalis, 2012.
- Vatican II: A Universal Call to Holiness, edited by Anthony Ciorra and Michael W. Higgins, New York: Paulist Press, 2012.
- Suffer the Children Unto Me: An Open Inquiry into the Clerical Sex Abuse Scandal, co-authored with Peter Kavanagh, Toronto: Novalis/Bayard Publishing, 2010.
- "Afterword", Names of Blessing, by Pier Giorgio Di Cicco, Toronto: Novalis, 2009.
- Stalking the Holy: In Pursuit of Saint-Making, Toronto: House of Anansi, 2006.
- Pope John Paul II: Connecting to Canadians, foreword by Michael W. Higgins, Toronto: Wiley/Canadian Press, 2005.
- Power and Peril: The Catholic Church at the Crossroads, co-authored with Douglas R. Letson, Toronto: HarperCollins. 2002.
- "Foreword", Sex and Marriage in the Catholic Tradition, edited by Douglas R. Letson, Ottawa: Novalis, 2001, pp. 11–18.
- "Foreword", The Future of Religion, by Bob Harvey, Novalis, 2001, pp. 7–9.
- Soundings: Conversations About Catholicism, co-authored with Douglas R. Letson, Ottawa: Novalis, 2000.
- The Muted Voice: Religion and the Media, Ottawa: Novalis, 2000.
- Heretic Blood: An Audiobiography of Thomas Merton, (CBC Audio Cassettes) 1999.
- Heretic Blood: The Spiritual Geography of Thomas Merton, Toronto: Stoddart, September, 1998. [U.S. edition in 1999; Sangue Eretico: La Geografia Spirituale di Thomas Merton (Garzanti) Italian (2001) and French edition Thomas Merton: La voie Spirituelle d'un hérétique (Bellarmin) (2000)].
- The Jesuit Mystique, co-authored with Douglas R. Letson, Toronto: Macmillan, 1995; London: HarperCollins, 1995; Chicago: Loyola University Press, 1995.
- Catholic Education—Transforming Our World: A Canadian Perspective, co-edited with Trafford, McGowan and Murphy, Ottawa: Novalis, 1991.
- My Father's Business: a biography of G. Emmett Cardinal Carter, co-authored with Douglas R. Letson, Toronto: Macmillan, 1990.
- "How Can We Sorrow"? - Essays on the Resurrection, edited by Michael W. Higgins, Waterloo: University of St. Jerome's College Press, 1989.
- Women and the Church: A Sourcebook, co-edited with Douglas R. Letson, Toronto: Griffin House, 1986.
- Portraits of Canadian Catholicism, co-authored with Douglas R. Letson, Toronto: Griffin House, 1986.
- Thomas Merton: Pilgrim in Process, co-authored/edited with Donald Grayston, Toronto: Griffin House, 1983.

Higgins' named lecture series include:

- Christian Culture Lecture, Assumption University, October 8, 2000: "Spirituality as Subversion: Chicken Soup be Damned".
- The Swanson Lectures in Spirituality, University of Calgary, September 21–24, 2000.
- 1998 Elizabeth Seton Lecturer, Mount Saint Vincent University, Halifax, September 30 - October 1, 1998: "Religion and the Canadian Media".
- Graduate Association's Lecturer (1995), St. Jerome's University, October 13, 1995: "Sexual Politics vs. Papal Politics: Never the Twain Shall Meet?".
- Christian Culture Lecturer, Campion College, University of Regina, January 26–27, 1995: "Thomas Merton and the Jesuit Poets"; "Ruminations on the Writing Life".
- Christian Culture Lecturer, Assumption University and the University of Windsor, February 5, 1989: "Autobiography as a Mode of Theological Inquiry: Muggeridge, White and Newman".
- Keenan Lecturer, St. Thomas More College, University of Saskatchewan, last week of October and first week of November, 1988: several lectures given for the Departments of English, Philosophy and Religious Studies, as well as the Keenan Memorial Lecture "The Making and Re-Making: The Many Masks of Thomas Merton " [published lecture series].
- Columbus Day Lecturer, Brock University, October 14, 1986: "The Laity and the Kairos".
- University of St. Dunstan's and the University of Prince Edward Island's Department of English and Religious Studies co-sponsorship, November 24 and 25, 1983: "Thomas Merton, Humanist", "Thomas Merton, Diarist", "Thomas Merton, Mystic".
- Higgins has also published over 60 articles, essays, film reviews and book reviews (general and academic). He is credited with over 75 published interviews, documentaries, dramas, and radio and television commentaries (including appearances on CTV's Canada AM, CBC Newsworld, CBC Radio's Ideas and a CBS Washington Special. Higgins also provided the ethical and humanistic perspective on the Discovery Channel's @discovery.ca twice per month, along with Dr. Pauline Mazumdar, Dr. Kee Dewdney, Rob Sawyer and Jay Ingram.
