= Herranen =

Herranen is a Finnish surname. Notable people with the surname include:

- Mikko Herranen (born 1976), Finnish multi-industrialist, singer/songwriter, recording engineer, and producer
- Kyle Herranen (born 1977), Canadian visual artist
