= Campion College (Regina, Saskatchewan) =

Private Roman Catholic university college in Canada

- Type: Federated college
- Established: 1917; 109 years ago
- Religious affiliation: Roman Catholic and Jesuit
- Academic affiliations: University of Regina
- President: Fr. Joseph P. Riordan, SJ
- Dean: Dr. David Meban
- Faculty: 35
- Administrative staff: 23
- Students: 750
- Location: Regina, Saskatchewan, Canada; 50°25′05.50″N 104°35′13.10″W
- Campus: Urban
- Website: Campion College

Campion College is a private Roman Catholic university college federated with the University of Regina and sponsored by the Jesuits of Canada. It is an undergraduate liberal arts college offering courses leading to a bachelor's degree in the arts, sciences, and fine arts. The college has its own staff, faculty, and infrastructure, including administrative and faculty offices, a chapel, a library, an auditorium, a cafeteria, lounges and common areas, classrooms, and tutoring centres.

== Jesuit identity ==
As a sponsored work, Campion forms part of the Jesuit post-secondary apostolate in Canada. Its governance, institutional mission, and academic life are shaped by that identity.

As a federated college in Regina, Campion expresses the charism of Jesuit higher education through liberal arts and sciences programmes open to the wider University of Regina community. Its mission joins academic excellence with the intellectual, spiritual, and social formation of the whole person. This approach connects university and professional preparation with reflection, magis, cura personalis, ethical responsibility, service, and justice.

The college is located on Treaty 4 territory. Its strategic planning has connected Jesuit education with reconciliation, inclusive community, service-learning, and collaboration with the University of Regina, its federated partners, Catholic schools, and other local communities.

Campion is one of six Jesuit post-secondary institutions in Canada. The other five are Corpus Christi College, St. Mark's College, St. Paul's College, Regis College, and St. Jerome's University.

== See also ==
- University of Regina
- Higher education in Saskatchewan
- List of Jesuit sites
