= Conversations in Bloomsbury =

1981 memoir by Mulk Raj Anand

- First edition cover
- Author: Mulk Raj Anand
- Language: English
- Genre: Memoir
- Publisher: Wildwood House
- Publication date: 1981

Conversations in Bloomsbury is a 1981 memoir that depicts writer Mulk Raj Anand's life in London during the heyday of the Bloomsbury Group, and his relationships with the group's members. It provides a rare insight into the intimate workings of the English modernist movement, portraying such prominent figures as Virginia Woolf, T. S. Eliot and D. H. Lawrence. Anand challenges the cultural narrative that many have received about these literary figures.

== Visions of the Bloomsbury Group ==
Anand leaves a snapshot of the Bloomsbury Group for posterity, focalizing the individuals within the group through issues of colonial prejudice. His revelations, written decades after his experiences, and retrospectively framed by a postcolonial perspective, often give uncomfortable perspectives on the racist and casually jingoistic attitudes of a seemingly liberal movement. Commentary often engages with the significance of the British 'civilising' mission. Comments include T.S. Eliot's remark 'I wish that Indians would tone down their politics and renew their culture'. Retrospectively, it is possible to point out shortcomings of these writers, inviting a re-examination of their work.

The text gives a highly subjective reading of the Bloomsbury Group, one which is elevated from a biographical recording to a complex and amusing satire of intellectual prejudice, by virtue of Anand's position on the margins of the group. The form of the text allows Anand to set up an ironic distance between the voices of the Bloomsbury Group and the silent undercurrents of their conversations. The prejudices and biases of the group become glaringly obvious because Anand guides the reader to see the dismissal of colonial cruelties that the insular nature of the group prevents them from seeing themselves.

Anand expresses particular disillusion with the group's ignorance of other cultures, arguing that this is an obstacle to the modernist endeavour. He is also critical of their disengagement with both national and international politics, particularly on the issue of Indian independence.

== Genre and form ==
Published in 1981, the text's frame of reference leads the reader to question the veracity of Anand's account. Most of the people he comes across have extensive bodies of work, and the reader cannot be sure where the line is between the people he met in 1920s London and the perceived personas of these writers years later. Described by Anand in the dedication to the 1981 edition as 'gossip' and as 'reminiscences' by Saros Cowasjee (Introduction), Conversations can be classified as life writing. It resembles a memoir, with the 'snapshot' style of the narrative implying that there is an element of entertainment to its construction. The text shows stylistic influences as wide as melodrama and travel writing. Anand shows the personalities of historical figures outside of their literary context. The text also shows a self-conscious understanding of its author's own intellectual maturation.

Ultimately, Conversations in Bloomsbury takes the form of the memoir rather than an autobiography; the episodic conversations are structured around Anand's personal interest rather than any particular narrative. This makes his recollections of his relationships deeply personal and thereby potentially unreliable. Although the conversations may not be recorded verbatim, he gives a sense of the personalities and opinions of each figure. The very literary nature of his encounters and conversations are sometimes strained and point towards a certain degree of implausibility. For example, in chapter eighteen, Anand asks "is it about India?" as his first question of a new novel. He requires an alert reader to realize the ironies embedded within his writing which echoes a modernist approach to writing. The conversations in structure also are never truly resolved; this echoes the colonial and subsequently post-colonial issues that trouble Anand throughout his narrative. Martha Jane Nadell in "Modernism and Race" points towards the traditional tension between race and modernism as modernism, though apparently progressive, ignored issues of race. Conversations in Bloomsbury realises this tension through his unfinished conversations, inability to express himself and follow strict codes of English conduct.

== Purpose ==
As a text that blurs the lines between memoir, fiction, and autobiography, Conversations enacts numerous textual aspirations. It is at once a portrait of an Indian ingenue and autodidact making his way, problematically, at times, into the inner circle of the Bloomsbury group; a biographical snapshot of the group's venerated literary figures; and the ways in which Anand attempts to assert himself, and by extension, India and Indian culture, into the conversations surrounding empire and colonialism in the progressive circle of the Bloomsbury group.

Anand demonstrates how the canonical modernists' discussions and texts, despite the progressive views that they represent, nevertheless demonstrate their heritage of an imperial discourse. He shows that "modernism sought energies in the strangeness and distance of the other... in the terms that seemed to fit into its essentially Eurocentric framework". The conversations—inaccessible as they are—are way of situating Indian culture at the same level as English culture. By depicting multiple conversations between himself and canonical British authors such as Virginia Woolf and T.S. Eliot, Anand equates himself as one of the Bloomsbury group. Although this could be seen as a mere tool of self-promotion, it also makes the point that the Indian culture Anand comes from is just as important as British culture.

== Historical disparities ==
The historical gap between the writing, subsequent publication and the experiences depicted in Conversations in Bloomsbury gives Anand license to imagine the past and the Bloomsbury Group. However, almost contradictorily Anand is legitimised by the undeniable fact that he was there. This contradiction is allowed for by the fact that Conversations is a memoir.

The substantial distance between experience and publication allows for an extremely critical perspective, contrary to Anna Snaith's perspective of the bloomsbury group as representing "a Britishness to do with bohemian modernity and intellectual freedoms", we are shown a collection of individuals who, although perceiving themselves to be at the forefront of liberal Britain, are often in fact ignorant in their conduct as regards Anands own culture and experience of British rule in India.

As Anand publishes his conversations in the 1980s, the authors he engages with have already been firmly cemented within the English literary modernist canon, only confirmed by the fact that most of them had died. He chooses to publish his book at a time when postcolonial critical theory is at its height, suggesting that perhaps he is deliberately satirising the revered status of the Bloomsbury Group at a time when it was popular to scrutinise modernist ideas under postcolonial light, playing on their affirmed celebrity status, made possible only by this historical gap.

== The tension in the book between exposé and homage ==
There is a distinct tension in the text between its presumed purpose as an exposé of the Bloomsbury group and as an homage:

The second edition of the text is dedicated to the memory of Leonard and Virginia Woolf and E.M. Forster, suggesting a deferential and reverent attitude towards the famous Modernist circle. This is evident in the text in Anand's presentation of himself as a nervous young student of the writers her portrays; he is awestruck and nervous at meeting famous figures such as T.S Eliot and Aldous Huxley. Eliot seems to act as Anand's mentor and he does menial work for Hogarth Press of which there is no record of payment. He constantly demonstrates self-consciousness of his cultural Otherness and attempts to assimilate his behaviour with English customs. For example, he tries to eat soup quietly like an Englishman rather than slurping it in accordance with Indian stereotypes.

However, at the same time there is a distinct undercurrent of cultural critique and social satire of both the literary figures and London as a metropolitan centre. The parallels drawn between the Indian caste system and the separation of Public and Private bars in London reveals how Anand is critical of the notion that the metropolitan centre is superior to its colonial counterpart. Anand constantly presents the famous figures as prejudiced against and ignorant of Indian customs and culture. These writers put forth their opinion on Indian culture without recognition of their ethnocentrism. For example, T. S. Eliot is shown to be narrow-minded about Indian religion despite its inclusion in his famous poem The Waste Land. Similarly, Clive Bell is depicted as ignorant of the wealth of Indian art, calling it 'crude craftwork' because it does not fit in with his Western notion of art for art's sake.

== Depiction of colonialism ==
Conversations in Bloomsbury depicts the London literary scene of the 1920s and 30s. A theme that runs throughout the conversations is Indian independence and the value of Indian culture. Anand brings this topic up with almost every writer featured. His own position is in favour of independence from British rule, demonstrated by his support of Gandhi's movement and being briefly jailed for his activism.

Writing in a post-independence India, Anand focuses on the variety of positions he encounters within the London literary elite. These vary from the dismissal of Clive Bell to the more progressive anti-imperialist attitudes of E.M. Forster and Leonard Woolf.

=== The Bloomsbury Group ===
Anand presents the majority of the Bloomsbury Group as being relatively anti-imperialist, citing ethical objection as Leonard Woolf's main motivation for leaving the Civil Service in Ceylon. The Woolfs' Hogarth Press notably published a number of anti-imperialist texts and marginalised writers.

E.M. Forster is also portrayed as anti-imperialist in his writings and attitudes. Anand specifically cites A Passage to India as a superior and more sympathetic representation of India, in contrast to Rudyard Kipling's Kim, which is praised in the opening chapters by Bonamy Dobrée.

Although most of the Bloomsbury Group are relatively kind and embracing of Anand and anti-imperialist attitudes, Gretchen Gerzina has argued that whilst 'the Bloomsbury Group may have been radicals in Edwardian English society, they were not radical enough to take seriously a viewpoint utterly removed from their own intellectual aesthetic world.' Anand aligns with this statement in his portrayal of core member Clive Bell, whose portrayal is far more negative than the Woolfs and other members of the Bloomsbury Group. His attitude towards Anand and Indian art in general is highly dismissive, as he criticises the aesthetics that don't align with his own definitions. Anand highlights his distinction between art and craft, and dismissal of Indian art as 'merely craft'.

== Anand's self-presentation ==
As a text that blurs the lines between memoir, fiction, and autobiography, Conversations enacts numerous textual aspirations. It is at once a portrait of an Indian ingenue and autodidact making his way, problematically, at times, into the inner circle of the Bloomsbury group; a biographical snapshot of the group's venerated literary figures; and an illustration of the ways in which Anand attempts to assert himself, and by extension, India and Indian culture, into his conversations with the coterie of Bloomsbury intellectuals surrounding politics (imperialism), philosophy, and literature.

Anand demonstrates how the canonical modernists' discussions and texts, despite the progressive views that they represent, nevertheless demonstrate their heritage of an imperial discourse. He shows that "modernism sought energies in the strangeness and distance of the other... in the terms that seemed to fit into its essentially Eurocentric framework" (Simon Gikandi in 'Geomodernisms: Race, Modernism and Modernity') The conversations—inaccessible as they are—are way of situating Indian culture at the same level as English culture. By depicting multiple conversations between himself and canonical British authors such as Virginia Woolf and T.S. Eliot, Anand equates himself as one of the Bloomsbury group. Although this could be seen as a mere tool of self-promotion, it also makes the point that the Indian culture Anand comes from is just as important as British culture.

== The text's relationship to modernism ==
As an Indian living in a society with a strong imperial presence in India that held the prejudice that came with it, Anand struggled to find his place within the intellectual community of Bloomsbury. He found himself having to assimilate to the culture in order to fit in. In the text, he describes how he exercised self-restraint over his strong political views, and engages in an internal dialogue in which he examines the role that race plays within literary modernism. The text gives an insight into how his cultural background contributed to shaping his experience as a writer working within Eurocentric structures. He dismantles the image of modernist writers by exposing and critiquing the prejudices that influence their work.

Despite his critical view of his modernist contemporaries, Anand was nonetheless influenced and inspired by them. Conversations alludes to the influence of writers such as James Joyce and his introspective novel A Portrait of the Artist as a Young Man on Anand's own emergence as a young writer.

In the memoir, Anand perceives himself as a social commodity for the Bloomsbury group; he feels accepted more for his cultural identity than his intellect and personality. The group's members seem to think they already understand Indian culture. They use Anand's company not as an opportunity to learn, but rather to have their judgments received and ratified by a colonial subject.
