= Dr. John Archer Library =

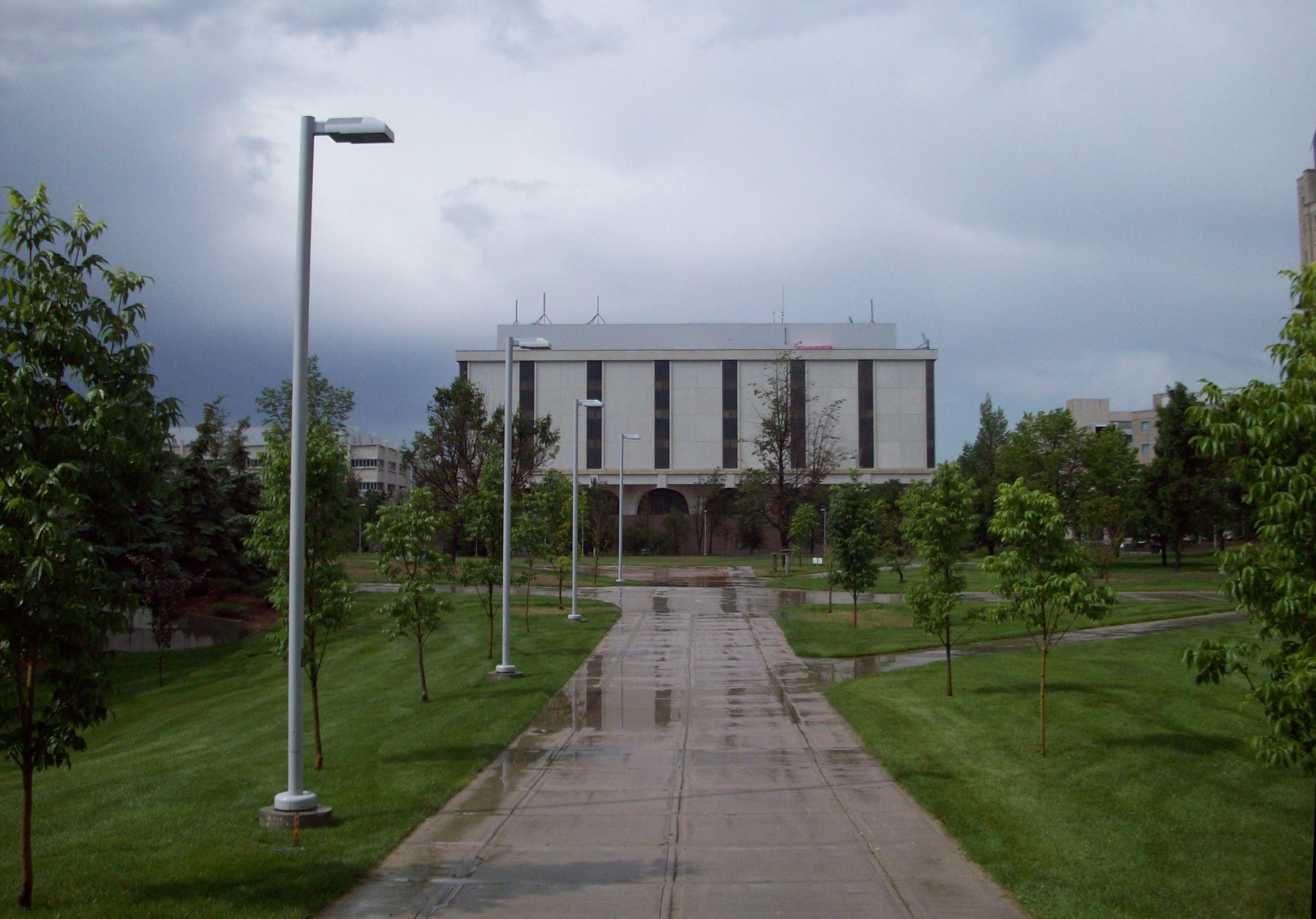
- 50.41887°N 104.59032°W
- Type: University of Regina Information repository and research resource
- Established: 1967

Collection
- Size: 830,000 monographs, journals and pamphlets; 585,000 government publications; 900,000 microform; 13,000+ maps; 31,500+ photos/slides.
- Criteria for collection: research publications

Other information
- Website: University of Regina library

The Dr. John Archer Library is the main library of the University of Regina in Regina, Saskatchewan, Canada. The library's purpose is to meet the teaching, learning and research needs of University of Regina students and faculty staff.

== Collections ==
Archer’s collection has more than 830,000 monographs, journals and pamphlets; it has approximately 585,000 government publications and more than 900,000 microform material. It also has a quickly growing electronic collection. Archer Library’s Archives contain almost 16,000 linear metres of holdings and is composed of historical University of Regina materials and private papers with an emphasis on journalism, visual arts and Saskatchewan literature. It has 13,000+ maps and plans, 31,500+ photographs and slides. Archer’s Special Collections have an emphasis on western Canada and Saskatchewan history; they also collect campus graduate theses.

== History ==
The Dr. John Archer Library building was officially opened in 1967 and dedicated in 1999. It was designed by Minoru Yamasaki, who also designed the other initial buildings on campus and advised on the Wascana Centre Authority in this capacity. The library was given more aesthetic treatment by Yamasaki than other buildings. It was originally planned to house 200,000 volumes. It is the first building on the University’s campus to be named after an individual.

== Dr. John Archer ==
Dr. John Hall Archer was first president of the University of Regina from 1974 to 1976. He continued after his presidency as professor of Western Canada History.

"In 1970, Dr. Archer was appointed as the Principal of the Regina Campus, then part of the University of Saskatchewan. He held positions with the Saskatchewan Provincial Library and served as Saskatchewan Legislative Librarian, Assistant Clerk of the Saskatchewan Legislature and Saskatchewan Provincial Archivist. He was director of libraries at McGill University, and associate professor of history at Queen’s University."

== Federated colleges ==
The University of Regina has three federated colleges, The First Nations University of Canada, Luther College and Campion College. Each college library is complementary to each other and to the Dr. John Archer collection.

== Partnerships and collaboration ==
The University of Regina libraries is a member of the Canadian Association of Research Libraries, the Council of Prairie and Pacific University Libraries (COPPUL), the Canadian Research Knowledge Network (CRKN) and is a contributor to the Open Content Alliance.
