= John Hall Archer =

John Hall Archer OC, SOM

1st President of the University of Regina
- In office 1974–1976
- Succeeded by: Lloyd Barber

Personal details
- Born: July 11, 1914 Near Broadview, Saskatchewan
- Died: April 5, 2004 (aged 89)

John Hall Archer, OC SOM (July 11, 1914 – April 5, 2004) was a Canadian librarian, historian, and civil servant, and the first President of the University of Regina.

Born just south of Broadview, Saskatchewan, he was a rural school teacher from 1933 to 1940. During World War II, he served with the Royal Canadian Artillery and was discharged with the rank of captain in 1945. In 1973, he was made an honorary colonel. He received a Bachelor of Arts degree in 1947 and a Master of Arts degree in 1948 from the University of Saskatchewan. In 1949, he received a Bachelor of Library Science degree from McGill University.

From 1951 to 1964, he was the Legislative Assembly of Saskatchewan librarian and from 1956 to 1961 he was the assistant clerk of the Legislature. From 1957 to 1962, he was the provincial archivist. From 1962 to 1964, he was chairman of the Committee on Continuing Education in Saskatchewan. From 1964 to 1967, he was the director of libraries at McGill University. From 1967 to 1970, he was an archivist and associate professor of history at Queen's University. He earned his Doctor of Philosophy degree from Queen's University.

In 1970, he became the principal of the Regina campus of the University of Saskatchewan and became the first president of the University of Regina in 1974 and served until 1976.

In 1980, he wrote the book Saskatchewan A History (ISBN 0-88833-062-6).

In 1980, he was made an officer of the Order of Canada. In 1987, he was awarded the Saskatchewan Order of Merit. The Dr. John Archer Library, the University of Regina's main library, is named in his honour.

He was married to Alice and had two children: John and Mary.
