= University of Regina =

Public university in Regina, Canada

Coordinates: 50°24′55.99″N 104°35′16.63″W

- Coat of arms
- Former names: Regina College (1911–1961); Regina Campus of the University of Saskatchewan (1961–1974)
- Motto: As one who serves
- Type: Public research university
- Established: 1974; 52 years ago
- Academic affiliations: CARL, CUSID, IAU, UArctic, Universities Canada
- Endowment: $128.4 million
- Chancellor: Cadmus Delorme
- President: Jeff Keshen
- Academic staff: 529
- Administrative staff: 1,283
- Students: 16,501 (fall 2019)
- Undergraduates: 14,474
- Postgraduates: 2,027
- Location: Regina, Saskatchewan, Canada
- Campus: Urban
- Newspaper: The Carillon
Colours
Green, Gold and Black
- Nicknames: Cougars, Rams (football)
- Sporting affiliations: U Sports – Canada West
- Mascots: Reggie and Rampage
- Website: uregina.ca

The University of Regina is a public university located in Regina, Saskatchewan, Canada. Founded in 1911 as a private denominational high school of the Methodist Church of Canada, it began an association with the University of Saskatchewan as a junior college in 1925. It disaffiliated from its Methodist founders and fully ceded to the university in 1934; in 1961 it attained degree-granting status as the Regina Campus of the University of Saskatchewan. It became an autonomous university in 1974. The University of Regina is a research university with a focus on experiential learning. Record enrolment was seen in September 2023, with over 16,800 students enrolled.

== History ==
=== Origins ===
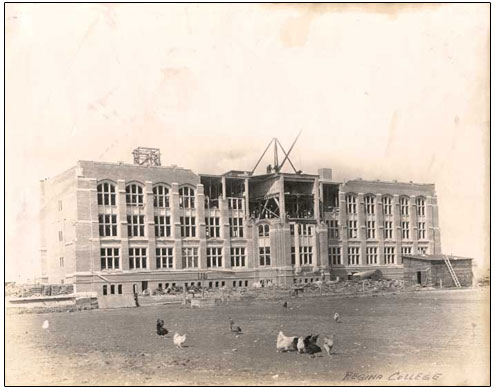
Regina College, designed by James Henry Puntin (architect), under construction on 16th Avenue (now College Avenue), 1913

The University of Regina is a non-denominational university, which grew out of Regina College, founded in 1911. In direct response to the award of the University of Saskatchewan to Saskatoon rather than Regina, the Methodist Church of Canada established Regina College in 1911 on College Avenue in Regina, Saskatchewan, starting with an enrolment of 27 students; it was adjacent to the now long-defunct St Chad's College (a theological seminary for the training of Anglican clergy) and Qu'Appelle Diocesan School, also on College Avenue. James Henry Puntin (architect) designed several buildings on campus including: Regina Methodist College (1910); East & West Towers (1914); Ladies Residence (1914); Gymnasium (1925); Power Plant (1927); Music & Arts Building (1928). "In 1928, Darke Hall was built on College Avenue, [d]escribed...as "an admirable theatre, one which few cities can rival."

In 1934 Regina College became part of the University of Saskatchewan. The University of Saskatchewan a single, public provincial university created in 1907 was modeled on the American state university, with an emphasis on extension work and applied research. The governance was modeled on the University of Toronto Act, 1906 which established a bicameral system of university government consisting of a senate (faculty), responsible for academic policy, and a board of governors (citizens) exercising exclusive control over financial policy and having formal authority in all other matters. The president, appointed by the board, was to provide a link between the 2 bodies and to perform institutional leadership. In the early part of this century, professional education expanded beyond the traditional fields of theology, law and medicine. Graduate training based on the German-inspired American model of specialized course work and the completion of a research thesis was introduced.

Regina College commenced a formal association with the University of Saskatchewan as a junior college offering accredited university courses in 1925 though continuing as a denominational college of the now-United Church of Canada, the successor to the Methodist Church. Regina College continued as a Junior College until 1959, when it received full degree-granting status as a second campus of the University of Saskatchewan.

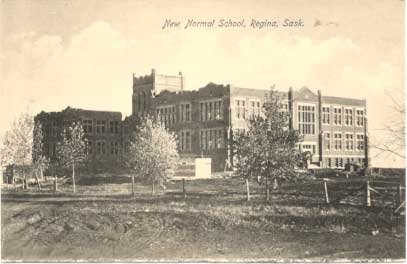
Normal School circa 1914

However, in 1934, the United Church was financially hard pressed by the Great Depression and in any case its history from the great Egerton Ryerson of urgent advocacy of universal free public education made its involvement in private schools anomalous. It accordingly fully surrendered Regina College to the University of Saskatchewan. Regina College and its successor Regina Campus of the University of Saskatchewan and University of Regina have retained the Methodist motto "as one who serves" (Luke 22.27).

The policy of university education initiated in the 1960s responded to population pressure and the belief that higher education was a key to social justice and economic productivity for individuals and for society. In 1961 the college was renamed the University of Saskatchewan, Regina Campus. In 1974 it became the independent University of Regina.

The original United Church affiliation is, however, symbolically commemorated in the convocation furniture, resumed by the university for ceremonial use from one of the last downtown United Churches, which closed in the 1990s.

=== University of Saskatchewan affiliation ===
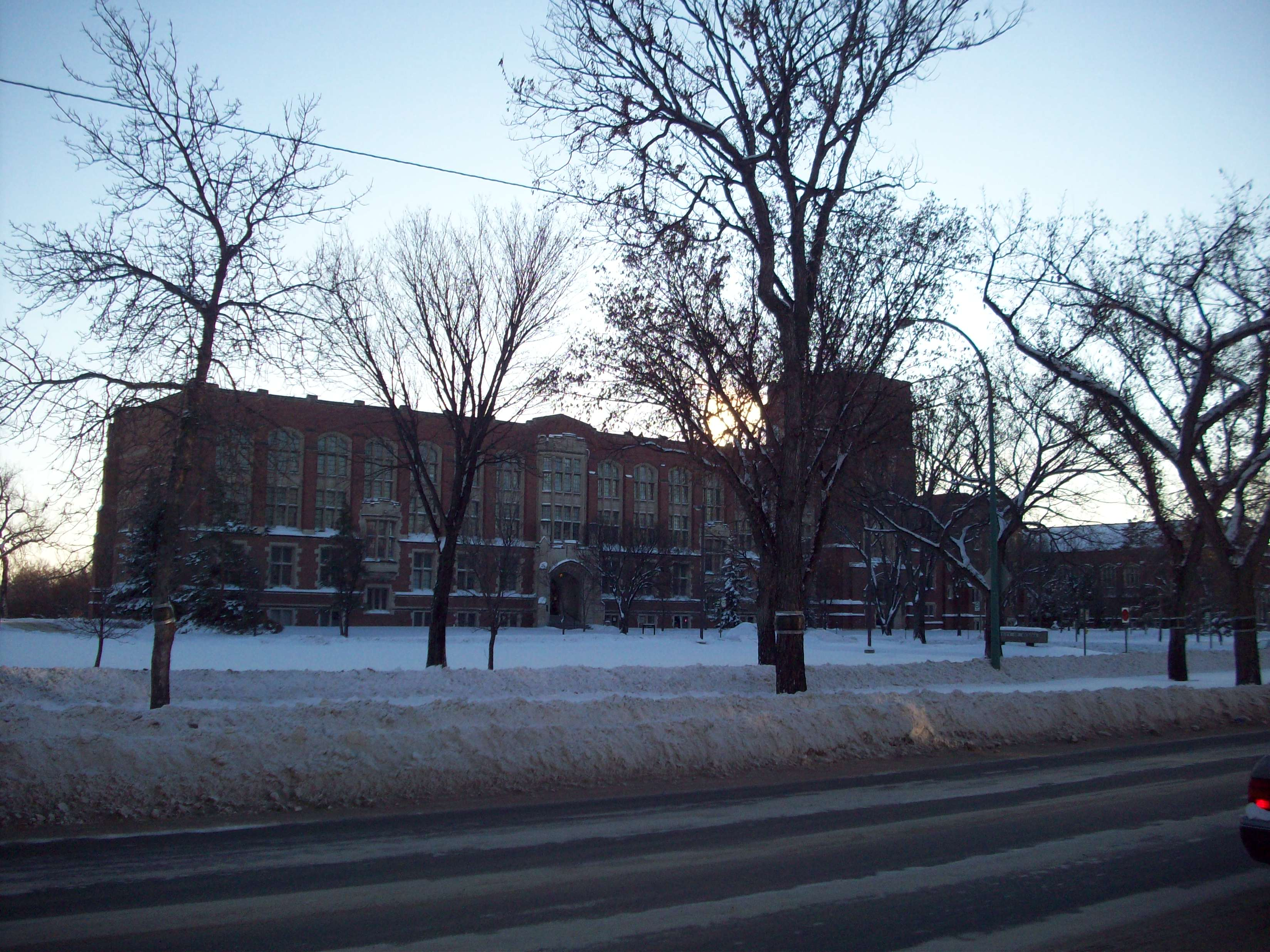
Regina College Building

With the transfer of control to the University of Saskatchewan the range of courses offered was somewhat broadened. During this period Campion and Luther Colleges, which maintained private high schools in Regina under the auspices respectively of the Roman Catholic and Lutheran churches, also retained junior college status in affiliation with the University of Saskatchewan; the Anglican Church (then known as the Church of England in Canada), whose St Chad's College had operated a theological training facility in Regina but had never established substantial numbers in Canada west of Ontario compared with larger denominations, meanwhile merged with Emmanuel College in Saskatoon and withdrew from tertiary education in Regina.

The upgrading process accelerated in 1961 when the college was granted full-degree-granting status as the Regina Campus of the University of Saskatchewan and students completing degrees at Regina Campus were granted degrees of the University of Saskatchewan.

=== Regina Campus ===
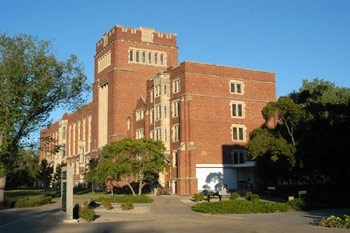
Regina College Building from west in 2010

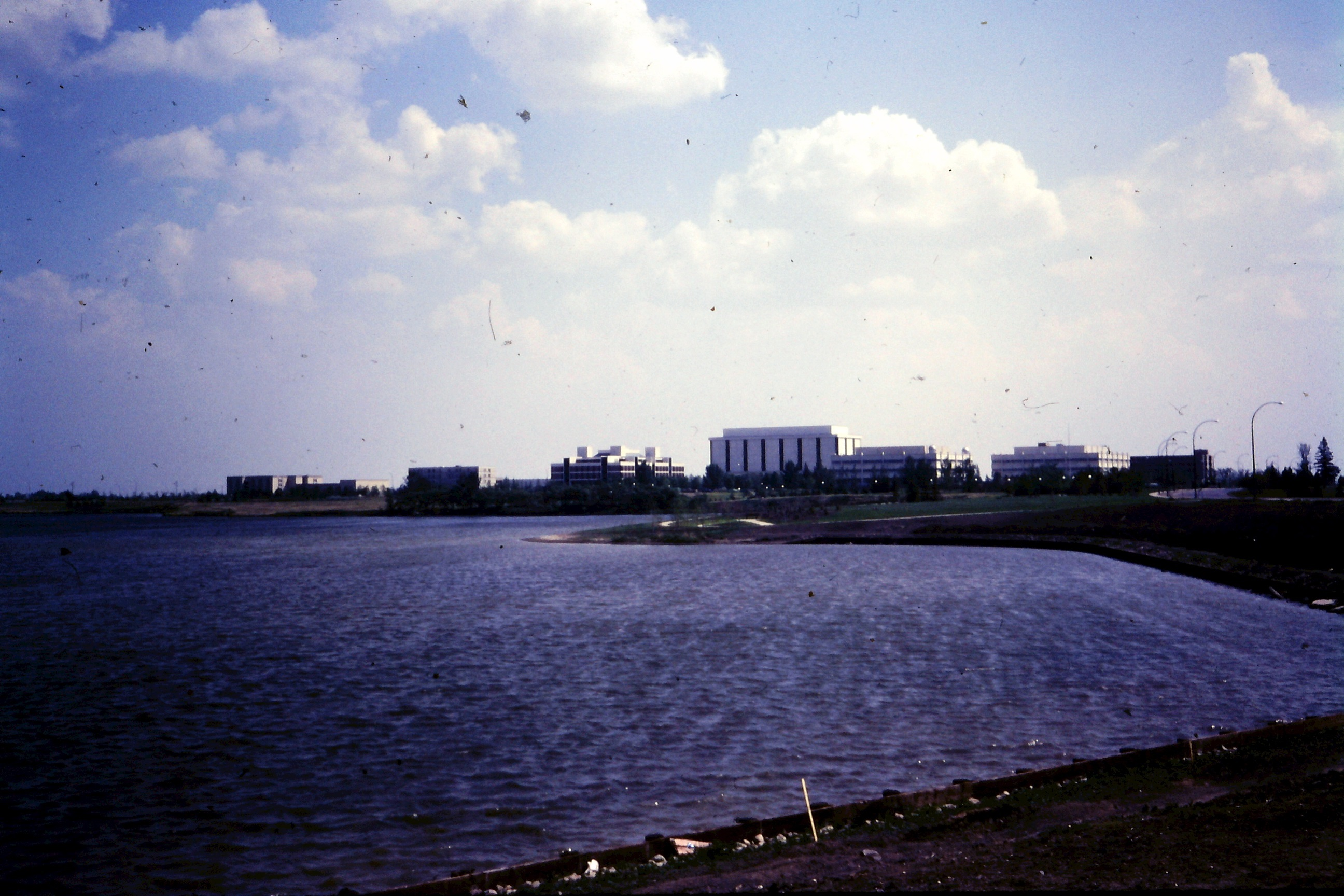
Regina Campus from Wascana Lake before it became University of Regina in June 1974

The arts and sciences programs evolved with the growth of Regina Campus, which held its first convocation in 1965. The new campus was begun in 1966 on Wascana Lake, to the southeast of the old campus whose buildings, however, remain in use: the old Girls' Residence is now used by the Regina Conservatory of Music; the Normal School, having at various times housed not only the teacher-training facility that is now the university's Department of Education but the Saskatchewan Museum of Natural History, war-training facilities during World War II when it was temporarily resumed by the federal crown and latterly the university's Fine Arts Department, is now the Canada-Saskatchewan Soundstage.

The original design of Regina Campus (as of Wascana Centre itself) and its initial buildings, in a stark concrete modernist style, were by Minoru Yamasaki, the architect of the original World Trade Center in New York.

Yamasaki's original vision

[was that ...the buildings] would be located close enough together that passage between them in the winter could be provided through connecting corridors in the "podium" or first [ground] floor of all buildings in the central instructional complex. Each podium would be larger than the remaining floors of the buildings rising above it, thereby creating the impression of separate buildings rising from a common base. The buildings would be constructed around sunken, landscaped courts which would be accessible visually and physically by generous windows and doors from the corridors located along these enclosing walls...

The Dr. John Archer Library, the main library of the university, was opened in 1967, one of the original three buildings of the new campus (the others being the classroom and laboratory buildings), and named after Dr. John Archer in 1999. Further building has been substantially in accord with Yamasaki's vision, notwithstanding some controversy over the years as to the suitability of its austere style for the featureless Regina plain; by 1972 with the demolition of Yamasaki's 1955 Pruitt–Igoe housing project in St. Louis, Missouri—such demolition being considered by some to be the beginning of postmodern architecture—Yamasaki's modernist aesthetic was already somewhat passé in the view of many architects.

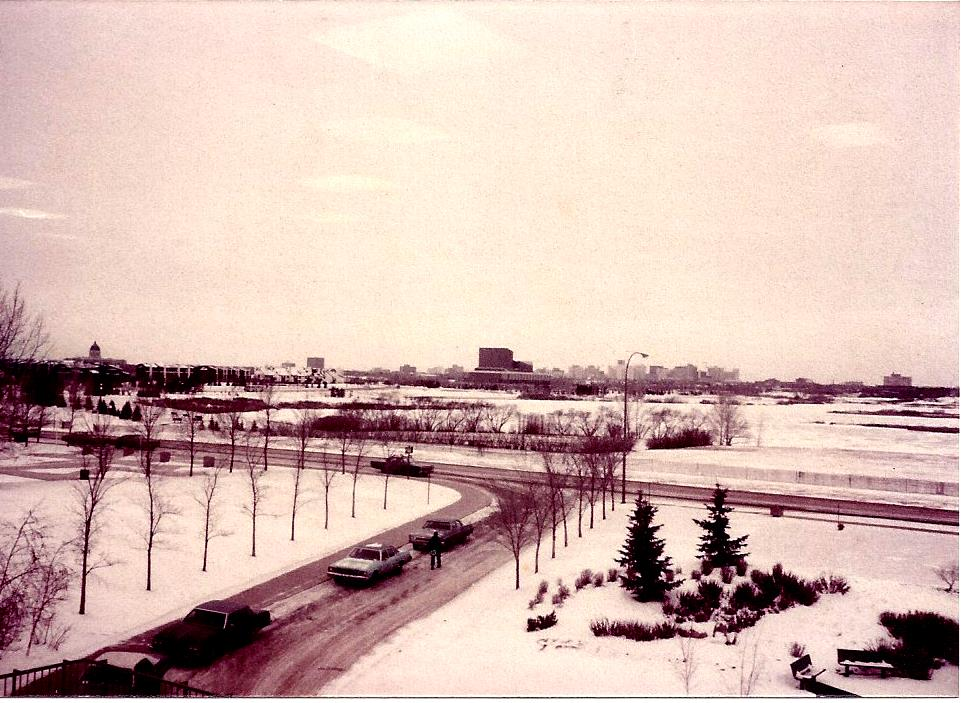
Saskatchewan Centre of the Arts from Laboratory Building

Campion College and later Luther College, which like Regina College had also been denominational junior colleges affiliated with the University of Saskatchewan, established "federated college" status on the model of Victoria, Trinity, St Michael's and University Colleges at the University of Toronto (and ultimately the collegiate system of Oxford and Cambridge) and built facilities at the new campus. (St Chad's, a fourth denominational college in Regina, operated by the Anglican Church of Canada on the former Anglican diocesan property on College Avenue immediately to the east of Regina College, merged with Emmanuel College on the Saskatoon campus in 1964 and, after a period of continuing to operate its private girls' high school closed its Regina facilities in 1970.)

In September 2000, the 600 City of Regina Wing of the Royal Canadian Air Force Association, erected a bronze war memorial plaque dedicated to the former personnel of No. 2 Initial Training School, who trained in the Conservatory of Music building during the Second World War.

=== An independent University of Regina ===
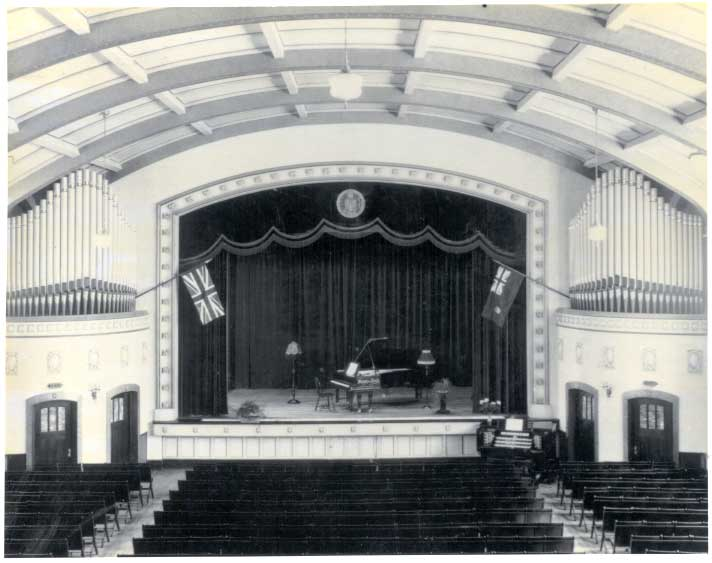
Stage inside Darke Hall, circa 1930

Because there was no follow-through regarding plans by the University of Saskatchewan to establish additional faculties at Regina (rather than the Saskatoon campus), the Faculty Council was formed to study the feasibility of creating an autonomous institution. A Royal Commission under a Supreme Court of Canada justice, Emmett Hall, found there to be "two campus groups warring within the bosom of a single university."

The University of Regina was established as an independent institution on 1 July 1974 and the first University of Regina degrees were conferred at the spring convocation in 1975.

In the summer of 2005 the University of Regina hosted the 2005 Canada Games. Many events took place in the newly completed state-of-the-art Centre for Kinesiology, Health and Sport. The administration of the games proceeded from the University of Regina Students Union offices and various other locations.

In 2015, The University of Regina opened La Cité universitaire francophone (La Cité) which is the first French University in Saskatchewan.

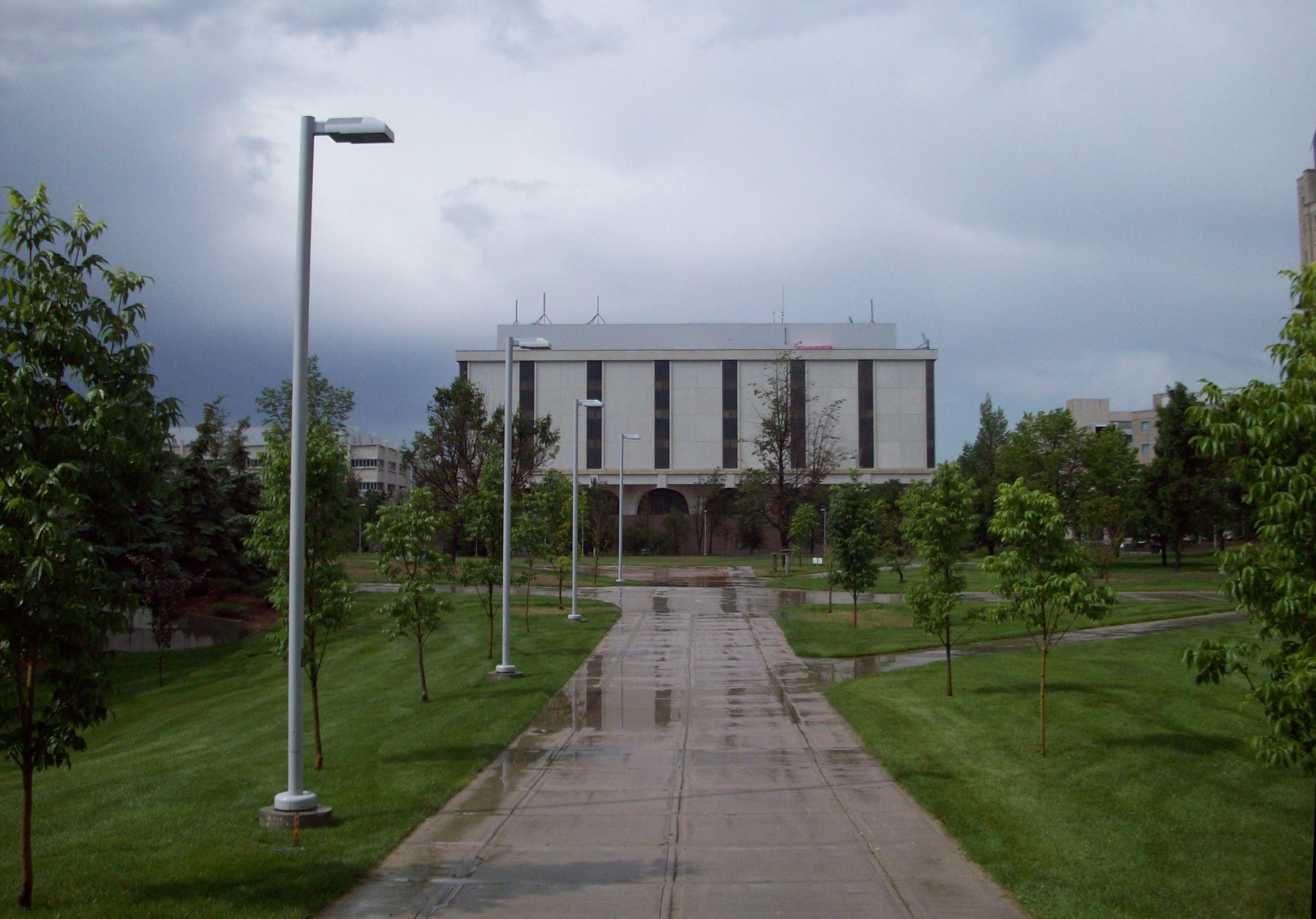
Dr. John Archer Library, Main Campus

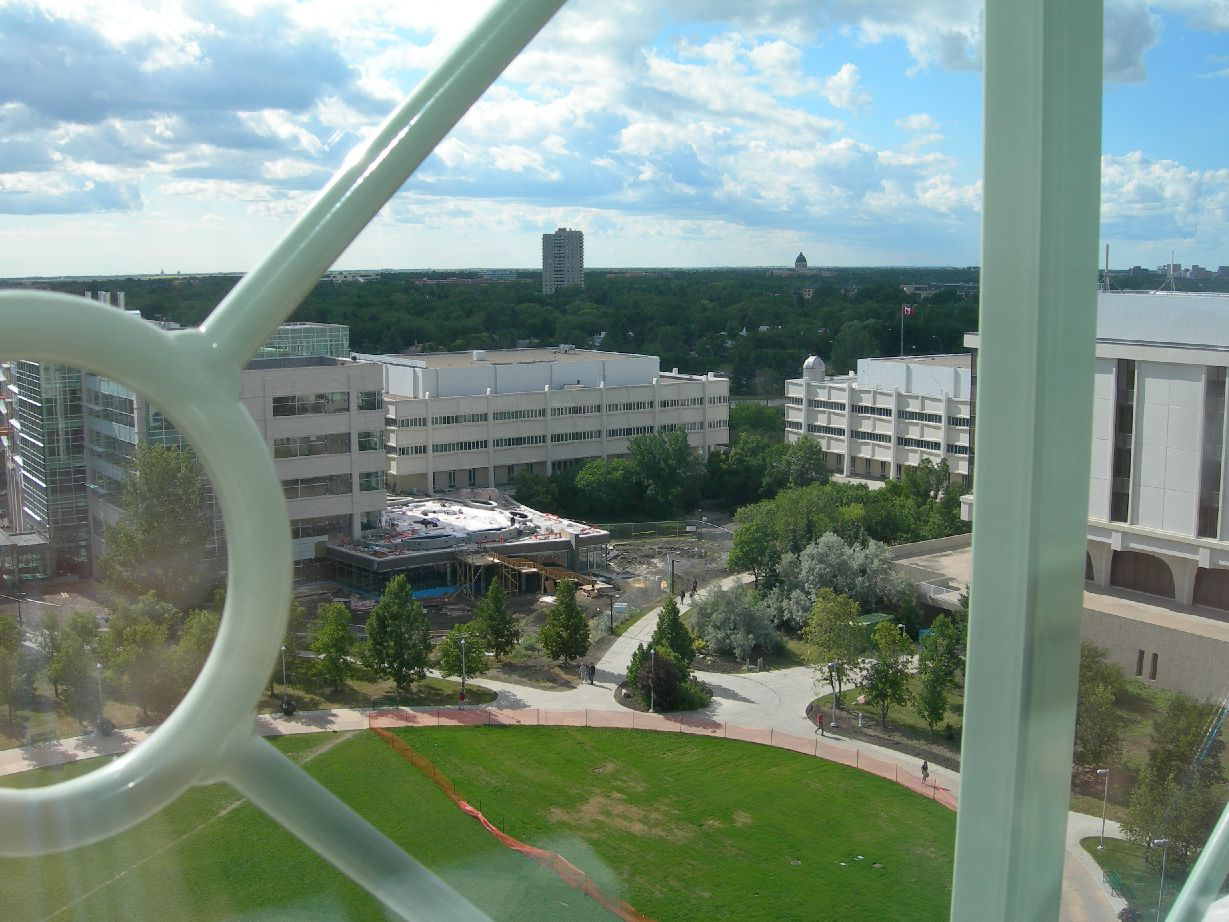
Classroom Building, Archer Library, and Research & Innovation Centre (under construction), viewed from South Residence

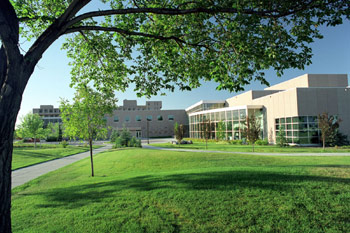
Riddell Centre and College West

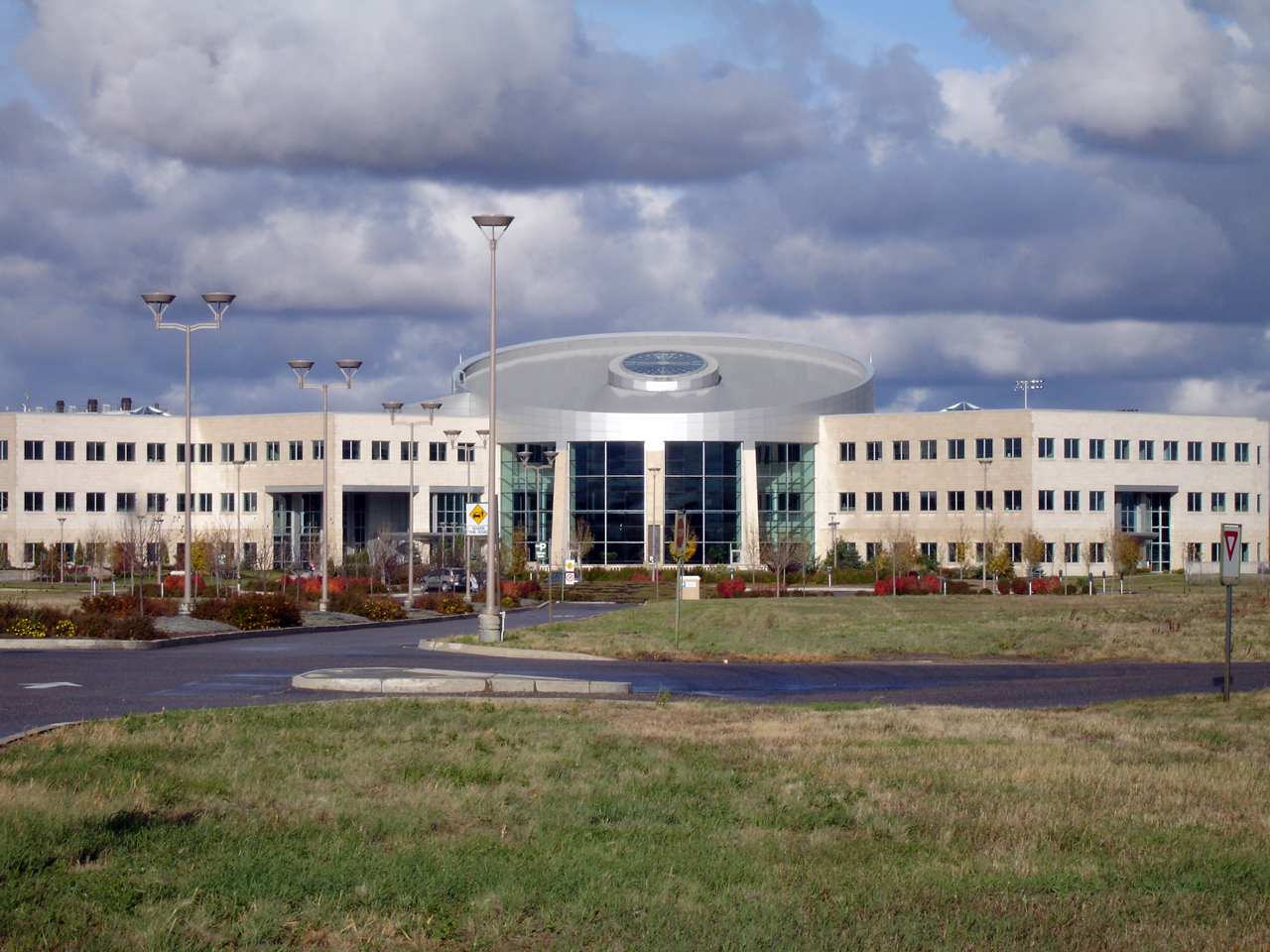
Terrace Building, at the Research Park

International enrolment at Saskatchewan post-secondary institutions more than doubled between 2014-15 and 2022-23. International students have spoken out saying Saskatchewan lacks the infrastructure to support the influx. The increase to 25% international of U of Regina's student body has come with increased incidences of racism directed at U of Regina students. International student tuition and fees for a bachelor of science at U of Regina total $24,882/year, domestic students pay $8,877/year.

== Federated colleges, regional colleges and associates ==
University rankings

World rankings
- QS World: 951-1000
- THE World: 601–800
- USNWR World: 935

Canadian rankings
- QS National: 28–30
- THE National: 20–27
- USNWR National: 25
- Maclean's Comprehensive: 15
- Maclean's Reputation: 39

The university has three federated colleges:

- Campion College
- First Nations University of Canada
- Luther College

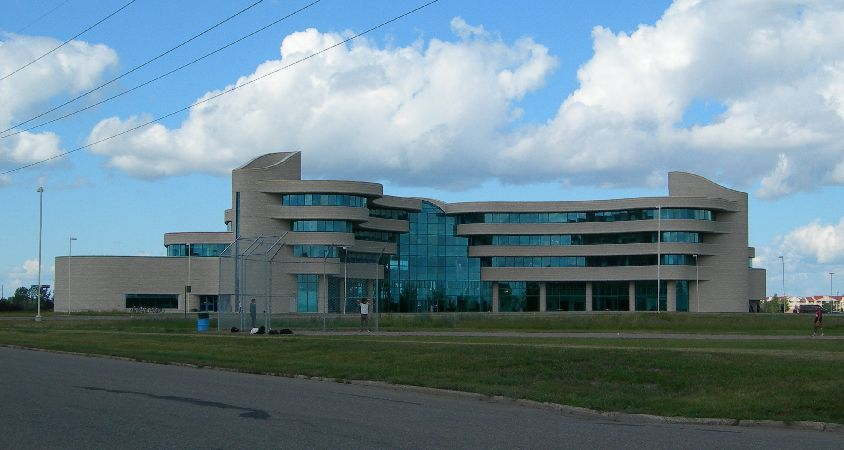
First Nations University of Canada

Campion and Luther colleges had been high schools offering junior college courses accredited by the University of Saskatchewan on the same basis as the old Regina College, out of premises located elsewhere in Regina. Campion College became a junior college of the University of Saskatchewan like Regina College in 1923, later severed that association in favour of one with St Boniface College in Manitoba, and returned to federated college status with the University of Saskatchewan in 1964. It built its facilities on the new Regina Campus in 1968 and subsequently vacated its original high school premises on 23rd Avenue. Its Regina Campus building was designed in accordance with Minoru Yamasaki's original plan for the campus, with a "podium," contemplated as eventually being joined with the campus-wide ground floor. Thus far this has not occurred and Campion's building remains isolated.

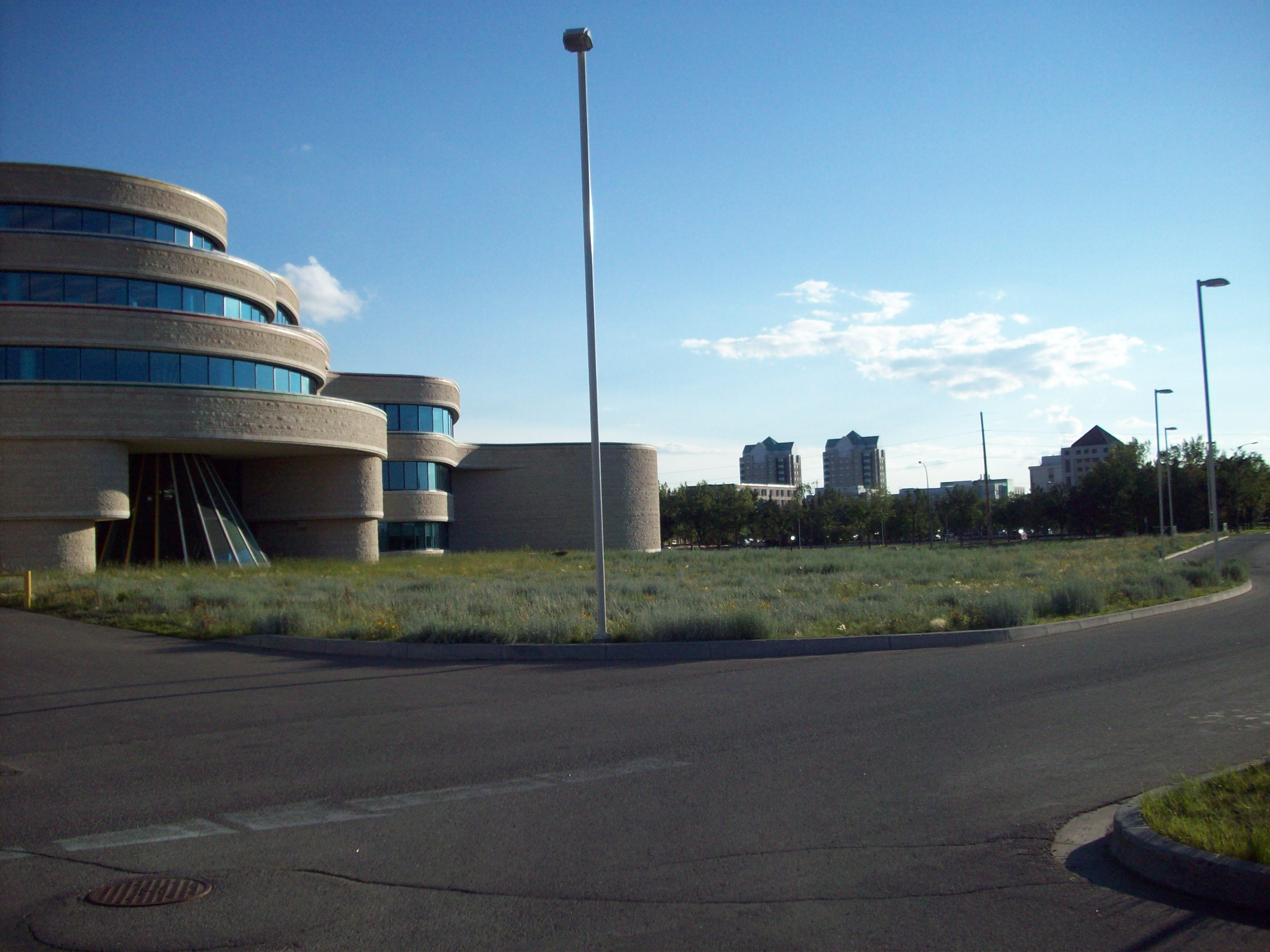
First Nations University on the left with Campion College, Wakpá Tower (South) and Paskwāw Tower (North) Residences, Library and Language Institute and Administrative Humanities Building

Luther College opened its building on the new Regina Campus in 1971 but continues to operate its high school on Royal Street, on the site of the first Government House of the North-West Territories. By this point the original Yamasaki plan for the campus was being reconsidered and the Luther College complex is isolated to the east of the principal campus buildings, though it is connected by an all-weather corridor via Campion College.

The First Nations University of Canada grew out of the Saskatchewan Indian Federated College, established in 1976 and then housed in a building immediately west of College West. It was an original foundation at the University of Regina. Its new building to the east of Luther College replaced its original facilities to the west of College West and was opened by Prince Edward in 2003 and visited by the Queen in 2005.

The United Church, having vacated tertiary education in Regina when it ceded Regina College to the University of Saskatchewan, and the Anglican Church, having removed its St Chad's College from Regina to Saskatoon, do not maintain any presence at the University of Regina. The Christian and Missionary Alliance Church formerly maintained the residential Canadian Bible College in Regina and offered some of its courses for accreditation with the University of Regina but was unable to obtain university status in Saskatchewan and vacated to Calgary in 2003.

Additionally, the University of Regina has two "Affiliated Colleges:" The Gabriel Dumont Institute and the Saskatchewan Polytechnic (formerly Saskatchewan Institute of Applied Science and Technology, SIAST). The university also has two "Associated Colleges:" Athol Murray College of Notre Dame and Briercrest College and Seminary. These institutions offer collaborative, associated, or articulated programs in conjunction with the University of Regina.

The university is an active member of the University of the Arctic. UArctic is an international cooperative network based in the Circumpolar Arctic region, consisting of more than 200 universities, colleges, and other organizations with an interest in promoting education and research in the Arctic region.

== Faculties ==
The University of Regina has ten faculties and one school that offer a variety of programs at the certificate, diploma, undergraduate and graduate degree levels.

| Faculty | Overview |
|---|---|
| Faculty of Arts | The U of R's largest faculty and is home to the social sciences, languages, and humanities. The Faculty of Arts offers the country's only Police Studies program. |
| Faculty of Business Administration | The Faculty encompasses both the Paul J. Hill School of Business (undergraduate programs) and the Kenneth Levene Graduate School of Business (graduate degree/certificate programs). |
| Faculty of Education | Offers undergraduate and graduate-level level for primary and secondary-level teaching. One of the U of R's quota (competitive entry) programs. |
| Faculty of Engineering & Applied Science | Engineering programs offered: Electronic Systems Engineering, Environmental Systems Engineering, Industrial Systems Engineering, Petroleum Systems Engineering, and Software Systems Engineering. Students may add a specialization in the following disciplines: Communications Engineering, Controls, Digital Design, Power Electronics, Manufacturing Engineering, and Process Engineering. |
| Faculty of Media, Arts, and Performance | Home to the U of R's fine and performing arts and art study programs in the arts of visual art, theatre, music, and media production and studies. |
| Faculty of Graduate Studies & Research | Offers masters and doctoral study programs in conjunction with all other faculties. |
| Faculty of Kinesiology & Health Studies | |
| Faculty of Nursing | Accepting its first intake in Fall 2011, offers a degree-track nursing program jointly with SIAST. |
| Faculty of Science | Departments and programs include computer science, math and statistics, geology, biology, physics, chemistry and biochemistry, and actuarial science. |
| Faculty of Social Work | With primary campuses in Regina and Saskatoon, and satellite campuses across Saskatchewan offers practice and research based programs of study. |

The University of Regina also has one graduate school, the Johnson-Shoyama Graduate School of Public Policy. It delivers Masters and Doctoral programs in conjunction with the University of Saskatchewan.

The University of Regina also offers a number of pre-professional transfer programs with other universities and professional colleges: Agriculture and Bioresources, Chiropractic, Dentistry, Law, Medicine, Nutrition, Occupational Therapy, Optometry, Pharmacy, Physical Therapy, and Veterinary Medicine.

At the centre of a predominantly English speaking campus, La Cité universitaire francophone at the University of Regina offers a wide range of French programs, services and activities. La Cité directs and supports research projects related to francophones in minority situations, as well as unique university-community initiatives that contribute to the development of the Fransaskois community.

=== Co-operative education ===
The University of Regina is one of the universities with co-operative education in Saskatchewan. Many of the university undergraduate students are enrolled in the co-op program, with the highest percentage being in the faculties of science and engineering. The Faculty of Arts offers an innovative internship program for its undergraduate students.

== Residences ==
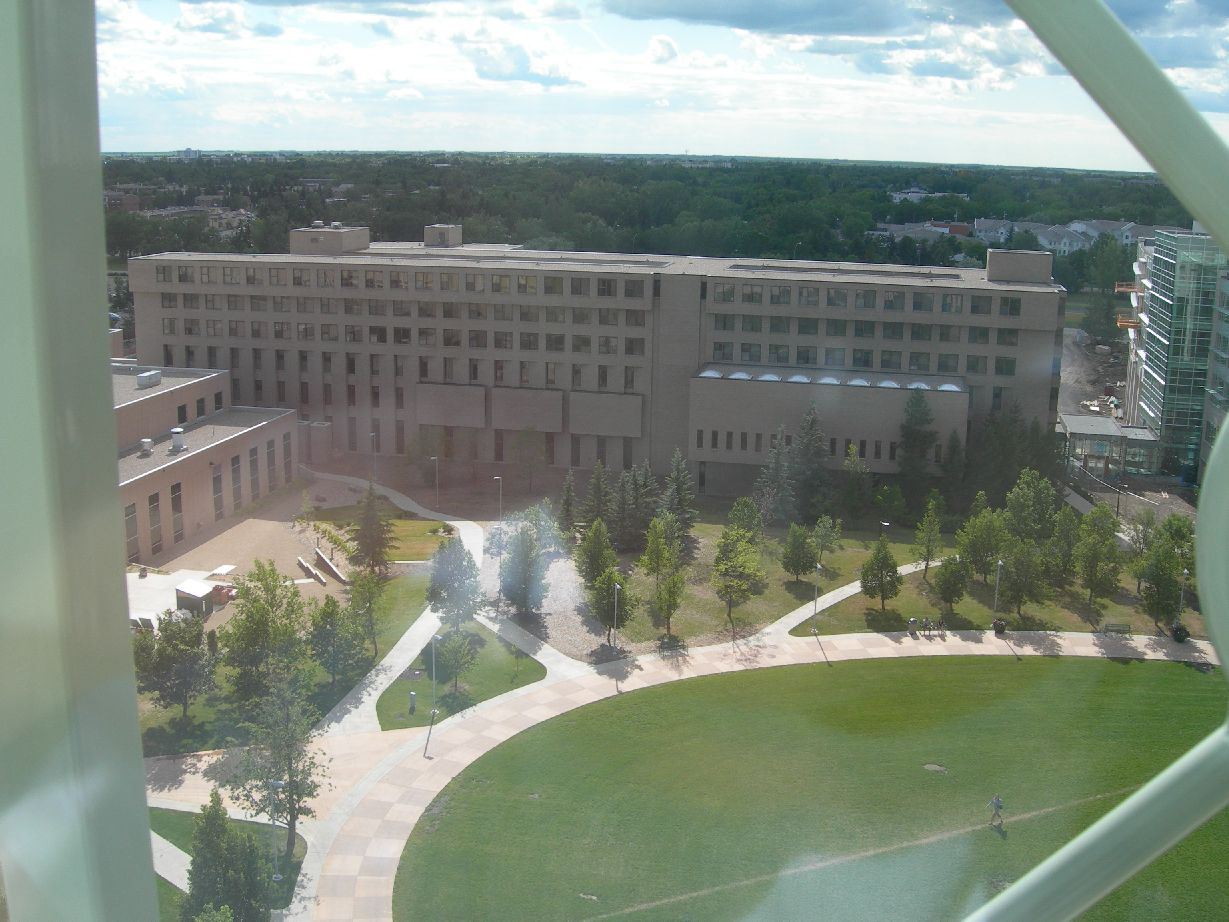
College West viewed from the South Residence, across the Barber Academic Green

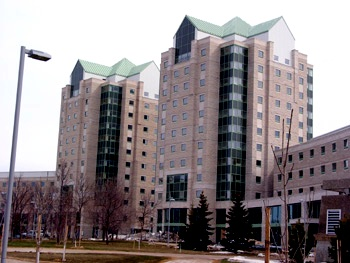
North and South Residences, from southwest on Oval

Regina College originally housed male and female student residences which were converted to academic use when the college became affiliated with the University of Saskatchewan in 1934. (The old Girls' Residence now accommodates the Regina Conservatory of Music.)

The Main (Wascana) Campus has residence space for about 1,200 students on-campus. Each bedroom is single-occupant, but many spaces on campus are designed to facilitate double occupancy, increasing capacity if required to address high demand without building additional residence space. The University of Regina residences have enlivened campus life from the somewhat bleak atmosphere of its founding days:

- College West, the first on-campus residential accommodation, constructed in 1972. Offers apartment-style residence living. The building also houses classrooms, academic and business offices and the Bookstore, previously located first in the Classroom Building and then the Administration Humanities Building.
- La Résidence in the Language Institute, gives priority to francophone students and those studying international languages. Offers dorm-style residence living. It maintains a French-speaking student atmosphere.
- Wakpá Tower (South) and Paskwāw Tower (North) Residences, completed in 2004. Two symmetrical, twelve-floor towers housing apartment, studio, and dorm-style residences. These buildings form the centre pinnacle for the campus and also house both External/Alumni Relations and the Faculty of Graduate Studies & Research.
- Kīšik Towers Residences, which opened in 2015. These twin 14-storey buildings offer two bedroom or four bedroom apartments, studio apartments and single dorms with private washrooms.
- Luther College Residences, part of Luther College (the university's second federated college and second on-campus residence), opened in 1971. Luther offers more traditional dorm-style residences with some shared facilities.

The University of Regina internally designates a significant portion of spaces annually to incoming (first year) students in an effort to facilitate the growing number of non-resident (international, out-of-province, rural) students choosing to live on-campus.

== Sports ==
The University of Regina is a member of U Sports and fields men and women's teams in various sports. Its teams bear the name "Cougars" in all sports, except the "Rams", which were originally a community junior football team competing in PJFC football without affiliation with the university, and who joined University ranks in 1999 as a member of the Canada West Conference of U Sports.

Men's varsity teams include the Regina Rams (football), basketball, cross country, hockey, swimming, track and field, volleyball and wrestling. Women's varsity teams include basketball, cross country, hockey, soccer, swimming, track and field, volleyball, and wrestling. The University of Regina is also home to several varsity club teams, including cheerleading, curling, dance team, rowing, men's rugby sevens, women's rugby sevens, women's softball, synchronized swimming, ultimate, and triathlon.

In the summer of 2005, the university hosted the Canada Summer Games.

== Media ==
The university's student newspaper is The Carillon. For many years it was an organ of radical student dissent. The Carillon has evolved into a more conventional paper.

== Indigenous programs ==
The University of Regina provides services to Indigenous people in more remote communities. The University of Regina's SUNTEP program was developed in partnership with specific Indigenous communities to meet specific needs within Indigenous communities. Indigenous Elders are present on campus at University of Regina to provide social supports. Through the University of Regina's Kâspohtamatâtân Mentorship Program Indigenous students act as role models to younger students still in their home communities. The University of Regina has established an Aboriginal Career Centre to assist with the transition to a fulfilling career.

== Arms ==
Coat of arms of the University of Regina
| Adopted Granted 20 December 2013 Crest A cross potent within a crescent Or Escutcheon Vert a chevron between in chief an open book flanked by two ancient crowns and in base a garb Or Motto As One Who Serves Banner Or an escutcheon of the arms. Badge On an oval Vert a garb enfiling an ancient crown Or |

== Notable faculty and alumni ==
- Janice Acoose, author, newspaper columnist, filmmaker, indigenous language advocate and professor of indigenous and English literature at First Nations University
- Gordon Barnhart, SOM, author, former secretary of the House of Commons, and former Lieutenant-Governor of Saskatchewan
- Chris Bauman, Canadian Football player
- Roy Bonisteel, Laurier LaPierre, Knowlton Nash, Bill Cunningham, Val Sears, Myrna Kostash, Walter Stewart, John Sawatsky and Maggie Siggins, inter alios, have been visiting professors in the School of Journalism.
- Bob Boyer (1948–2004), visual artist, Professor and Head of Indian Fine Arts, SIFC.
- Gail Bowen, playwright and writer of mystery novels, was associate professor of English at First Nations University
- Peter Calamai, science journalist and member of the Order of Canada
- Lorne Calvert, Premier of Saskatchewan (2001–2007)
- Tevaughn Campbell, CFL and NFL player
- Ruth Chambers, ceramics and installation artist
- Stefan Charles, NFL, AAF, and CFL player
- Theren Churchill, Canadian Football Player
- Jason Clermont, Canadian Football Player
- Saros Cowasjee, novelist, short story writer, critic, anthologist, screenwriter
- Jonathan Denis, Alberta MLA and Minister of Housing and Urban Affairs (1997)
- Shadia B. Drury, professor of political science and philosophy; Canada Research Chair in Social Justice
- Jo-Ann Episkenew, scholar of Indigenous health
- Holly Fay, artist and recipient of the National Visual Arts Advocacy Award
- Jaxon Ford, Canadian Football player
- Tamon George, Canadian Football player
- Chris Getzlaf, Canadian Football Player
- Joan Givner, biographer, novelist and short story writer
- Glenda Goertzen, children's author
- Ralph Goodale, Canadian High Commissioner to the United Kingdom, former member of Parliament, former Minister of Finance
- Eric Grimson (BSc 1975), computer scientist and Chancellor of MIT
- Akiem Hicks, NFL Football Player (Chicago Bears)
- Kyle Herranen, Canadian Interdisciplinary Artist
- John Hewson, former Australian federal opposition leader
- Jorgen Hus, Canadian Football Player
- Nick Hutchins, Canadian Football player
- Brett Jones CFL and NFL Center (New York Giants)
- Trenna Keating, Canadian actress
- Donald Kendrick, 1970s music faculty member as to choir and organ; subsequently in successive universities and choir master in assorted cities in eastern Canada and the United States; presently in California
- Brendon LaBatte, Canadian Football Player
- Michelle LaVallee, curator, artist, and educator
- Jeannie Mah, ceramic artist
- Charity Marsh, assistant professor of Media Production and Studies, Canada Research Chair in Interactive Media and Performance
- Frank McCrystal, former Ram Head Coach
- Manjit Minhas, entrepreneur and television personality
- Ken Mitchell, novelist and playwright
- Ellen Moffat, artist
- Marc Mueller, former Ram Quarterback, current CFL coach
- John Cullen Nugent, sculptor
- Teale Orban, former Ram Quarterback
- Mitchell Picton, Canadian Football Player
- Noah Picton, former Ram Quarterback
- David Plummer, computer scientist and creator of Task Manager and Space Cadet Pinball
- Zenon Pylyshyn, Rutgers University, leading authority in cognitive science, Ph.D. (1963), Experimental Psychology, University of Saskatchewan (Regina Campus)
- Elizabeth Raum, Canadian oboist and composer
- Addison Richards, Canadian Football Player
- Jon Ryan, CFL and NFL punter
- Nicole Sarauer, Saskatchewan MLA and former Leader of the Official Opposition
- Christine Selinger, Canadian paracanoe gold medalist
- Daniel Scott Tysdal, poet
- Andrew Scheer, politician
- Jordan Sisco, CFL wide receiver
- Christina Stojanova, film historian
- Dione Taylor (BFA), a noted jazz singer
- Vianne Timmons, former president and vice-chancellor of the University of Regina
- Guy Vanderhaeghe, novelist
- Senator Pamela Wallin, former national broadcaster and Canadian Consul in New York
- Lee Ward, PhD., noted political scientist

== See also ==
- Regina Public Library
- Higher education in Saskatchewan
- University of Regina Press
