= Corpus Christi College (Vancouver) =

College in British Columbia, Canada

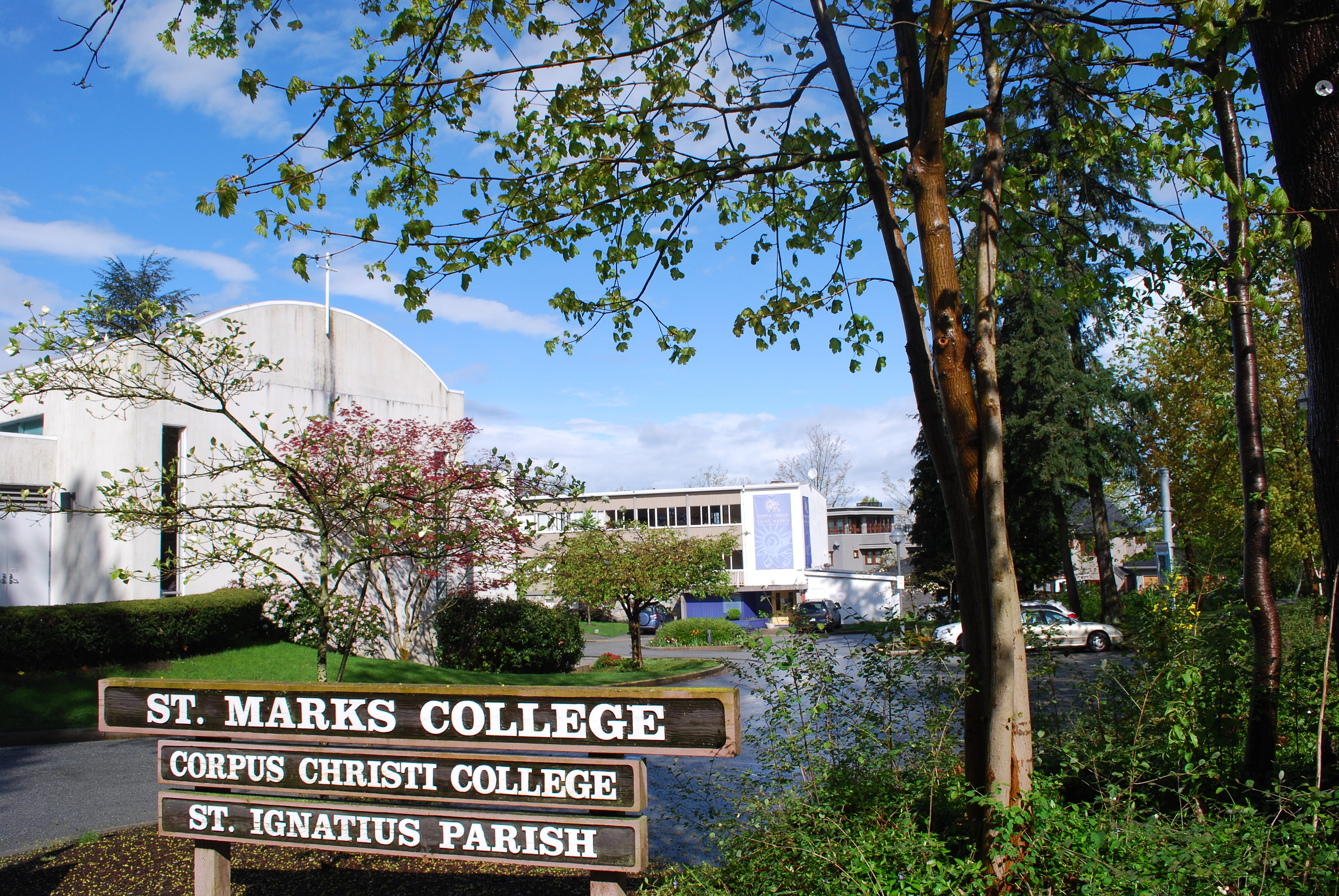
- Type: College affiliated with University of British Columbia
- Established: 1999; 27 years ago
- Religious affiliation: Roman Catholic and Jesuit
- Academic affiliations: ACCC, University of British Columbia
- President: Dr. Gerry Turcotte
- Principal: Dr. Gerry Turcotte, St. Mark's College
- Location: 5935 Iona Drive; Vancouver, British Columbia; V6T 1J7, Vancouver, Canada; 49°16′N 123°15′W
- Campus: Urban on UBC Campus
- Sporting affiliations: CCAA
- Website: corpuschristi.ca

Corpus Christi College (CCC) is a Catholic post-secondary institution affiliated with the University of British Columbia (UBC) and endorsed by the Jesuits of Canada. Located on the UBC campus in Vancouver, British Columbia, Canada, it was established in 1999. The college provides a range of courses in arts, business, and science with an emphasis on small class sizes and close interaction between students and faculty.

== Academic Programs ==
Corpus Christi College offers a liberal arts program that is recognized by UBC, the University of Victoria (UVic), Simon Fraser University (SFU), and other public universities in British Columbia, as well as private colleges. Students can complete up to 60 credits in core subjects and electives, which can contribute toward degree programs in fields such as business and nursing.

The college offers courses in a variety of disciplines including English, History, Religious Studies, Communications, Philosophy, Mathematics, as well as elective courses in subjects like Film, Theatre, Digital Media, Anthropology, Classical Studies, Economics, Fine Arts, French, Geography, Political Science, and Psychology. Additionally, students have the opportunity to take courses directly at UBC. The college awards an Associate of Arts degree and offers pathways toward a Bachelor of Arts degree recognized by UBC's Faculty of Education.

== Accreditation and Membership ==
In June 2000, Corpus Christi College received program approval from the University Presidents' Council. The college is an institutional member of the BC Transfer System, which allows its courses to be listed in the BC Transfer Guide.

In April 2001, Corpus Christi received full accreditation from the BC Private Post-Secondary Education Commission (PPSEC), now known as the BC Private Career Training Institutions Agency (PCTIA). The college is also a member of the Association of Catholic Colleges and Universities of Canada (ACCUC), which represents leading Catholic higher education institutions in Canada.

== Campus and Location ==
Corpus Christi College's Vancouver campus is located in the University Endowment Lands on Point Grey, Vancouver. It shares its location with St. Mark's College, which focuses on graduate and theological studies.

== Student Life ==
Corpus Christi College has a high percentage of students engaged in community service and leadership programs. The college supports students through various services, including academic advising and smaller class sizes, which facilitate a more personalized learning experience. This supportive environment has contributed to CCC being a popular option for students who plan to transfer to UBC.

== See also ==
- St. Mark's Chapel, Vancouver
- St. Mark's College, Vancouver
- University Endowment Lands
- Regent College
- List of universities in British Columbia
- Higher education in British Columbia
