= St. Mark's Church (Vancouver) =

Coordinates: 49.272148°N 123.249244°W

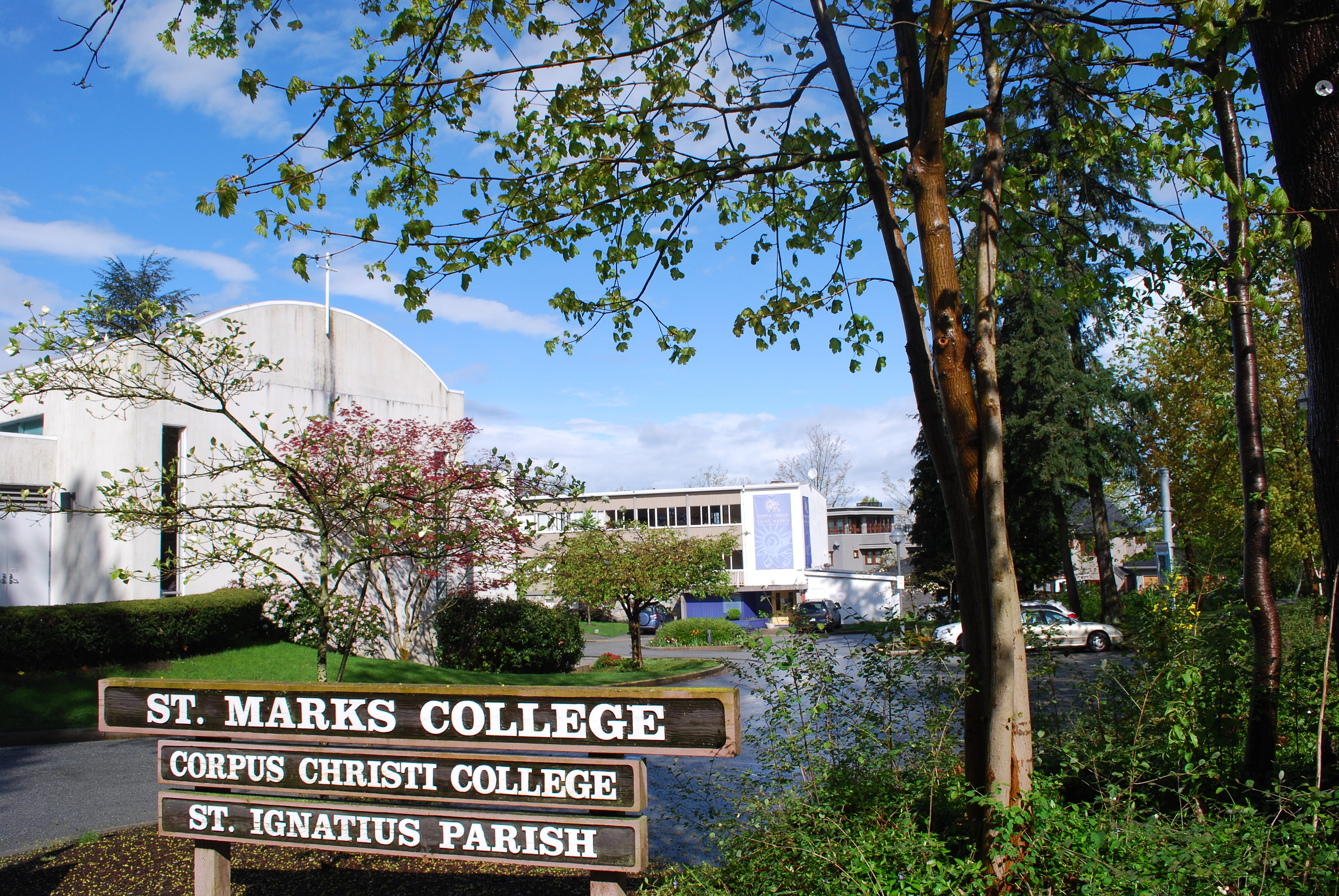
- Church is on the left

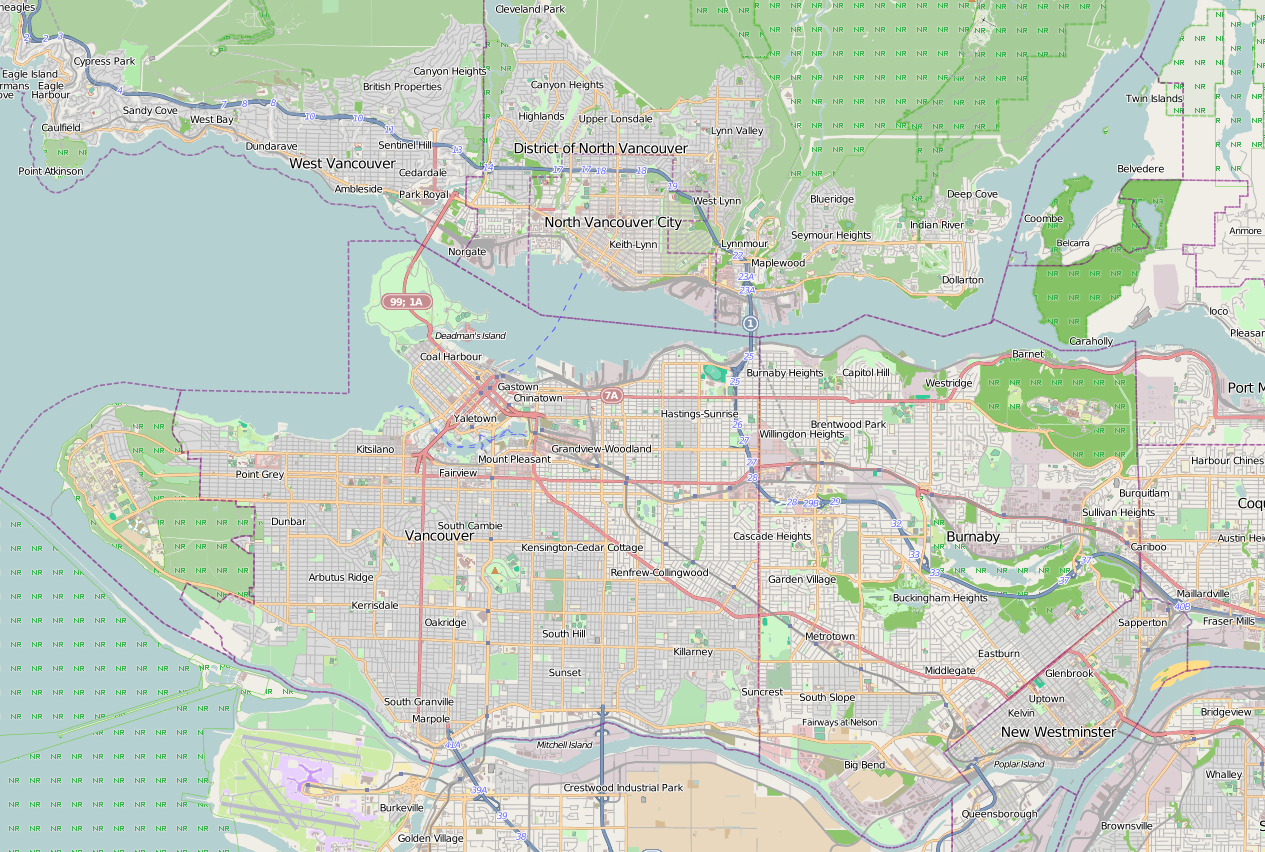
- Location in Vancouver
- Location: 5935 Iona Drive; Vancouver, British Columbia; V6T 1J7
- Denomination: Roman Catholic and Jesuit
- Website: StMarksParishVancouver.ca

History
- Former name: St. Ignatius of Antioch Parish
- Status: Parish church
- Founded: 1967
- Founder(s): Archbishop Martin Johnson; Fr. Albert Zsigmond
- Dedication: Mark the Evangelist

Architecture
- Functional status: Active
- Completed: 1998

Administration
- Archdiocese: Vancouver
- Deanery: Vancouver West
- Parish: St. Mark's Parish

St. Mark's Church is a Roman Catholic Parish church at St. Mark's College (Vancouver). The parish serves the community of Point Grey through the University of British Columbia campus in Vancouver, British Columbia, Canada. St. Mark-Corpus Christi College is on the University Endowment Lands. It was founded in 1967 by the Congregation of St. Basil and since 2007 it has been served by the Society of Jesus - the Jesuits.

== History ==
St. Mark's Parish was originally called St. Ignatius Parish, dedicated to Saint Ignatius of Antioch. Although it is based on the campus of St. Mark's - Corpus Christi College, it was originally without a permanent church location. The parish is hosted by the college.

=== St. Ignatius Parish ===
In 1956, St. Mark's College was founded by the Congregation of St. Basil. It is affiliated with University of British Columbia. It is a Roman Catholic theological college, being next to Corpus Christi college (a Roman Catholic liberal arts college) it became the central Catholic centre on the Vancouver campus of the university.

In 1967, the Archbishop of Vancouver, Martin Johnson founded the parish of St. Ignatius of Antioch. The first parish priest was Fr. Albert Zsigmond. Masses were originally held in St. Anselm's Anglican Church. When Fr. Zsigmond died in 1991, the parish reached a high point of 150 families. In 1997, the arrangement with St. Anselm's came to an end and a new site for the parish had to be found.

=== St. Mark's College Chapel ===
In 1998, St. Mark's College opened a new chapel. An agreement was soon made for the college chapel to host St. Ignatius Parish. The parish priest, Fr. Leo Klosterman, CSB, was also registrar of the college.

In 2005, the Basilians left St. Mark's College and handed over administration of the parish to the Order of Friars Minor, when Fr. Brian Burns OFM was appointed as parish priest.

=== St. Mark's Parish ===
In 2007, Fr. Brian Burns OFM died and the Jesuits were asked to serve the parish. Fr. Jim Sheppard SJ was the first Jesuit parish priest and was present from 2007 to 2011. During his time there that it was requested by the parishioners and then decided by Archbishop John Miller CSB to have the parish centred in St. Mark's Chapel, change the name from St. Ignatius Parish to St. Mark's Parish, and the chapel become a church. In January 2012, it was formally named The Parish of St. Mark.

== Parish ==
Today, the church has three Sunday Masses: 9:30 AM and 11:30 AM. There is a Sunday afternoon 4:30pm Mass only during the Academic year (September to April). There are weekday Masses at 12:10 PM from Monday to Friday open to the community at the UBC campus and students of St. Marks-Corpus Christi College. The parish sponsors many events for the community.

== See also ==
- St. Mark's College, Vancouver
- Congregation of St. Basil
- List of Jesuit sites
