= Saros Cowasjee =

- Born: 12 July 1931; Secunderabad, Hyderabad State, British India (now in Telangana, India)
- Died: 8 December 2019 (aged 88)
- Citizenship: Canada
- Occupations: Writer and professor

Academic background
- Education: St. John's College, Agra (B.A.); Agra College (M.A.); University of Leeds (Ph.D.)
- Doctoral advisor: G. Wilson Knight

Saros Dara Cowasjee (12 July 1931 – 8 December 2019) was an Indian-born Canadian novelist, short story writer, commentator, critic, anthologist, and screenwriter, as well as a professor emeritus at University of Regina.

== Early life and education ==
Cowasjee was born in Secunderabad, India on 12 July 1931, to Dara and Meher Cowasjee. He had a sister and a brother. He earned a B.A. from St. John's College, Agra in 1951. He completed a M.A. from Agra College in 1955. In 1960, Cowasjee completed a Ph.D. from University of Leeds. He researched Seán O'Casey under the supervision of G. Wilson Knight.

== Career ==
Cowasjee was an editor for two years with the Times of India Press in Bombay (now renamed Mumbai). In 1963, he joined the faculty of the University of Saskatchewan, Regina Campus as an instructor of English. In 1971, he became a full-time professor. Upon retirement in 1995, Cowasjee became professor emeritus.

Cowasjee said "…I am a Canadian citizen, though my I sell much better in the U.K. and India than I do in Canada…. Perhaps my work lacks Canadian content and sensibility. Also, to be noticed in Canada one has to be an aggressive salesman, as aggressive as a Jehovah's Witness, and as prepared to take insults and get the door shut in one's face."

== Personal life and death ==
Cowasjee was Parsi, a Zoroastrian community in India. He emigrated to Canada in 1963 and was a Canadian citizen. Cowasjee resided in Regina, Saskatchewan. He died on 8 December 2019, at the age of 88.

== Selected works ==
=== As author ===
- Sean O'Casey, the Man Behind the Plays (1963);
- O'Casey (1966);
- Stories and Sketches (1970);
- Goodbye to Elsa (1974);
- Mulk Raj Anand: Coolie : an assessment (1976);
- Nude therapy (1978);
- So Many Freedoms: A Study of the Major Fiction of Mulk-Raj Anand (1978);
- The last of the maharajas: A screen play based on Mulk Raj Anand's Private life of an Indian Prince (1980);
- Suffer little children (1982);
- Studies in Indian and Anglo-Indian Fiction (1993);
- The Assistant Professor (1996).

=== As editor ===
- Author to Critic: The Letters of Mulk Raj Anand to Saros Cowasjee (1973);
- Modern Indian Short Stories (1982);
- Stories from the Raj (1983);
- More Stories from the Raj and After (1986);
- Indigo by Christine Weston (1987, 1993);
- The Wild Sweet Witch by Philip Mason (1989);
- Women Writers of the Raj: Short Fiction (1990);
- Four Raj Novels (Omnibus) (1994);
- Orphans of the Storm: Stories on the Partition of India (1995);
- The Best Short Stories of Flora Annie Steel by Flora Annie Steel (1995);
- The Oxford Anthology of Raj Stories (1999).

=== Introductions ===
- Private Life of an Indian Prince by Mulk Raj Anand (1970);
- The Trilogy comprising The Village, Across the Black Waters and The Sword and the Sickle by Mulk Raj Anand (2016).
