= Kyle Herranen =

Canadian visual artist (born 1977)

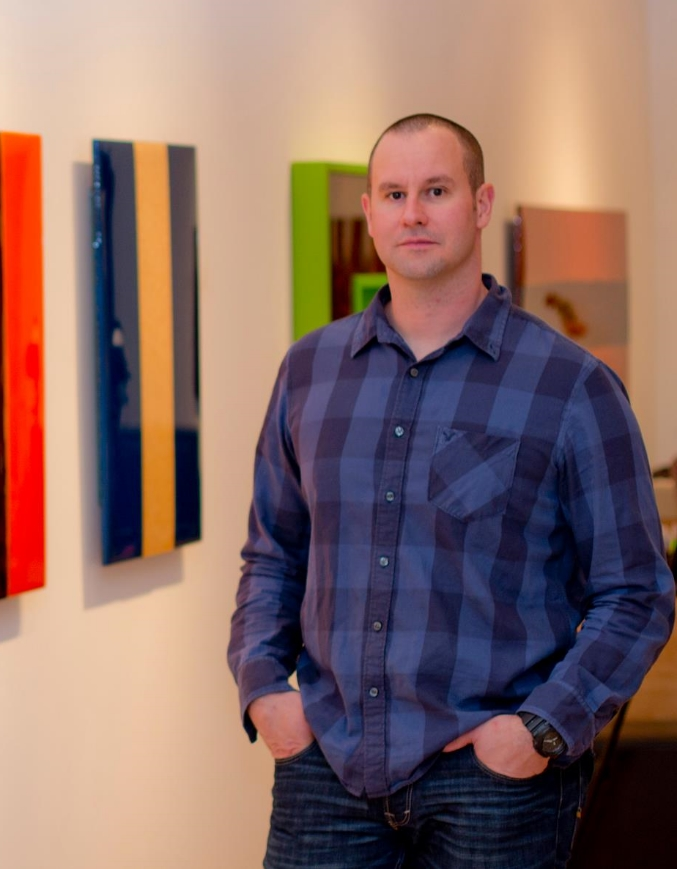
- Born: Kyle Herranen; July 5, 1977 (age 49); Espanola, Ontario, Canada
- Education: York University (BFA); University of Regina (MFA)
- Known for: Interdisciplinary Artist
- Website: www.kyleherranen.com

Kyle Herranen (born July 5, 1977) is a Canadian visual artist. He studied Traditional Animation at Sheridan College in Oakville, Ontario (1997) before earning a Bachelor of Fine Arts at York University in Toronto (2004) and receiving his Master of Fine Arts from the University of Regina in Regina, Saskatchewan (2008). Herranen lives and works in Regina, Saskatchewan, Canada.

== Work ==
The artist is an interdisciplinary artist that produces a range of work including: installation art, painting, photography, performance, and sculpture. His work is invested in notions and concepts of material. Using materials as signifiers, he subtly interrogates hierarchical and dichotomous categories, including urban and rural, public and private, real and representational, masculine and feminine, modern and contemporary. Kyle was included in Mind the Gap!, a National touring exhibition. In the fall of 2012 Galleries West named Kyle one of Canada's "Who's Who of Collectable Artists". Herranen has exhibited both provincially and nationally, and his art is featured in corporate, private and public collections across Canada, the United States, and the United Kingdom including the Mosaic Corporation, the City of Regina, and the Dunlop Art Gallery. In 2014 he was commissioned by the Canadian Department of Foreign Affairs, Trade and Development to represent the Province of Saskatchewan for a project at Canada House in London, UK.

== Public and Corporate Collections (selected) ==
- Canada House, London, UK
- City of Regina, SK
- Dunlop Art Gallery, SK
- Saskatchewan Arts Board
- Timmins Family Health Network, ON
- The Mosaic Company, SK
- University of Regina, SK
