= St. Mark's College (Vancouver) =

Coordinates: 49.272459°N 123.249187°W

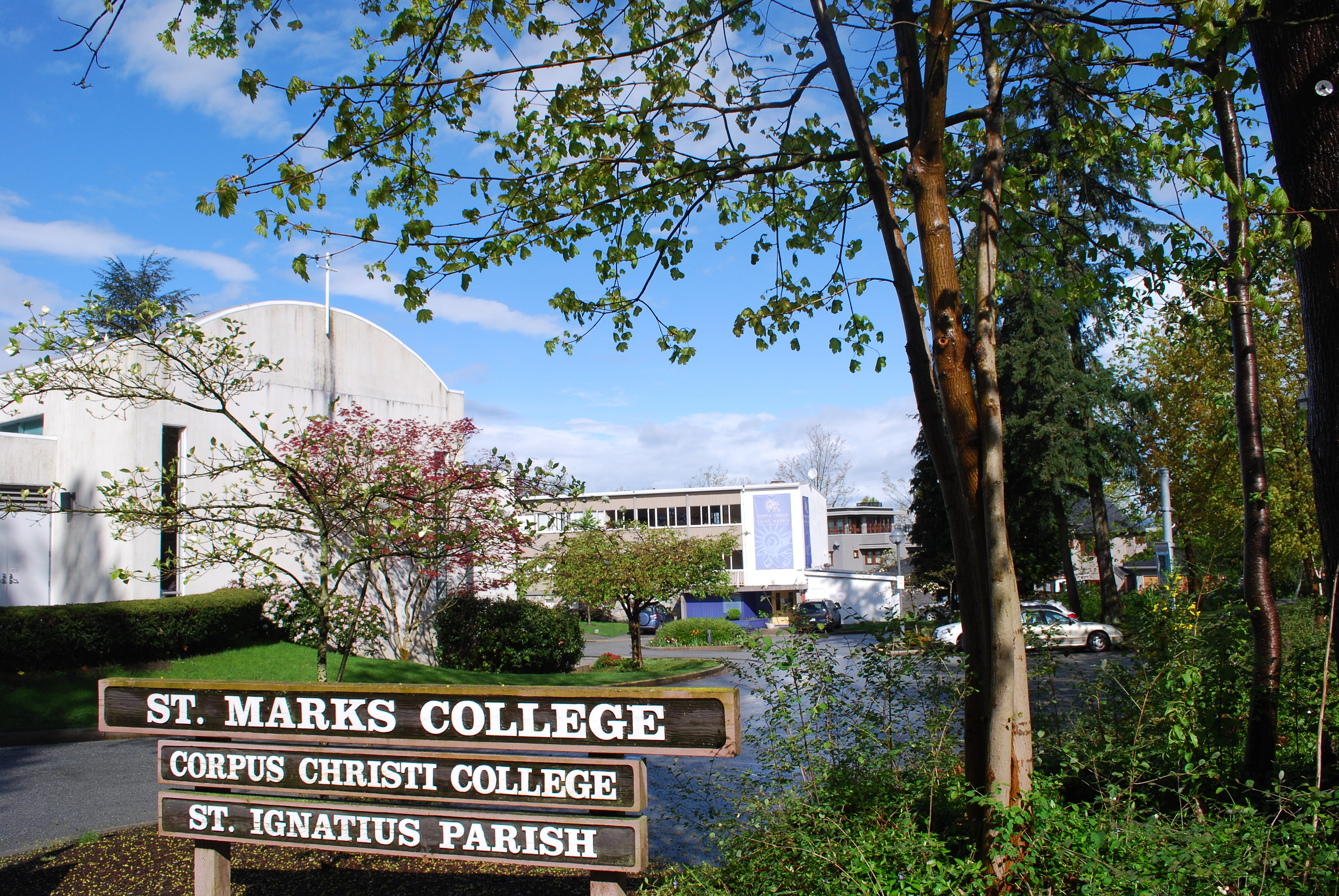
- College and chapel entrance
- Type: Theological College
- Established: 1956; 70 years ago
- Affiliations: University of British Columbia
- Religious affiliation: Roman Catholic and Jesuit
- Principal: Dr. Gerry Turcotte
- Location: 5935 Iona Drive, Vancouver, British Columbia, Canada
- Campus: Urban
- Website: StMarksCollege.ca

St. Mark's College is a Catholic theological college affiliated to the University of British Columbia. It was founded in 1956 by the Congregation of St. Basil for graduate studies and undergraduate studies at Corpus Christi College founded in 1999 as a liberal arts college. As of August 2022, Dr. Gerry Turcotte is the president of Corpus Christi College and is the principal of St. Mark's College and the community. The college is situated on the University Endowment Lands on West Point Grey on the UBC Campus. The college hosts the local parish church, St. Mark's Church.

== History ==
In 1956, St Marks College was founded by the Congregation of St. Basil when it received its charter from the Parliament of British Columbia. The Basilian Fathers also founded the University of St. Michael's College in the University of Toronto and Assumption University in Windsor, Ontario. When St. Mark's was founded it was immediately affiliated with the University of British Columbia. Since the college was next to UBC, Corpus Christi College was formed in 1999 in the Jesuit tradition for higher education.

The college hosts St. Mark's Church on its grounds where the parish uses the auditorium and chapel for services. The parish serves as a ministry to the community and neighbourhood the university.

While the Basilian Fathers supported the college, Fr. Jim Hanrahan CSB (the longest-serving principal of the college) taught in the University of British Columbia Department of History. On the St. Mark's campus, the south wing is named Hanrahan Hall after him.

In 1998, construction of St. Mark’s College was completed and hosted the local Catholic parish St Ignatius. The registrar of the college, Fr. Klosterman CSB also served as parish priest.

In 2005, the Basilian fathers transitioned away from the college and parish. That year, the college appointed its first lay Principal, Dr. David Sylvester.

On 15 October 2013, the principal of St. Mark's College, Mark Hagemoen was appointed as the bishop of the Diocese of Mackenzie-Fort Smith. On 16 June 2014, Dr Peter M. Meehan was appointed as the new principal of St. Mark's College and the President of Corpus Christi. Michael William Higgins became the interim president and principal in June 2020. Dr. Gerry Turcotte in August 2022 now serves as the current principal of St. Mark's College and president of Corpus Christi College.

== Facilities ==
=== Campus ===
The college is located in the northeast of the university's Vancouver campus. The buildings include the Dr. John Micallef Memorial Library, various classrooms, student lounges and study spaces, a cafe, and the college chapel, as well as administrative areas for student advisors and faculty members.

=== Academic programs ===
The college, through its charter, is able to offer Bachelors and Masters degrees in theology. The College currently offers Masters and Masters of Arts in Theological Studies, Educational Leadership, Pastoral Studies, and Religious Education. A diploma is available for each program.

As well, it is in charge of the academic formation for the first permanent diaconate program in the Archdiocese of Vancouver. Each year at its graduation ceremony, the College also grants an honorary doctorate.

The undergraduate program through Corpus Christi College is a 2-year liberal arts transfer program and offers and Associate of Arts degree.

=== Library ===
The Dr. John Micallef Memorial Library serves students and faculty of St. Mark’s and Corpus Christi Colleges, and B.C.’s Catholic community. It is the largest Catholic library in B.C. that is open to the public. It shares the catalogue and online resources with the Vancouver School of Theology.

== Notable faculty ==
- Fr David Bauer (1924–1988), Basilian priest, founder of the Canada men's national ice hockey team and inductee into the Hockey Hall of Fame

== See also ==
- St. Mark's Chapel, Vancouver
- Corpus Christi College
