= Shumiatcher =

Shumiatcher is the surname of a Russian Jewish family whose members achieved prominence in law, business, and the arts in Canada and the United States. Family members include:

- Bella Shumiatcher (1911–1990), pianist and music educator
- Esther Shumiatcher-Hirschbein (1899–1985), Yiddish poet and screenwriter
- Jacqueline Shumiatcher (born 1923), Canadian philanthropist, arts patron, and art collector
- Morris C. Shumiatcher (1917–2004), Canadian lawyer, human rights activist, philanthropist, arts patron, art collector, author, and lecturer
- Minuetta Shumiatcher Kessler (1914–2002), Canadian-American concert pianist, classical music composer, and educator
