= Charles Thomas Cozens =

- Born: July 29, 1952 (age 74); Hamilton, Ontario
- Genres: Classical, Classical Crossover, Jazz, Pop, New Age
- Occupations: Conductor, Arranger, Orchestrator, Composer, Music Director, Producer, Impresario, Pianist, Accordionist, and Musician with Quartetto Gelato
- Instruments: Accordion, Piano

Charles Cozens (born July 29, 1952) is involved in the music industry in Canada as an arranger for solo artists; a composer writing in multiple genres for diverse organizations including chamber ensembles, musical theatre, and television; a conductor and producer of crossover orchestral shows; a performer on piano and accordion in jazz, classical, and pop styles; and as a recording artist and producer.

In his professional activities, Cozens promotes Canadian musicians and music, and he brings together different musical genres in performance.

In 2013, Cozens was the first Canadian invited to Cuba to conduct. He continues to conduct Orquesta de Villa Clara from time to time.

Cozens' latest projects include the creation of The Burlington New Millennium Orchestra (BNMO is a 30 piece contemporary chamber orchestra specializing in a broad-based non-classical repertoire) and the recording of 16 CDs of Mozart for the Mozart Effect brand released in 2017. He joined the world-touring classical crossover ensemble Quartetto Gelato as their accordionist in 2018.

He is a member of the Local 149 Toronto Musicians’ Association, Local 293 Hamilton Musician's Guild, American Federation of Musicians, SOCAN, ASCAP, ACTRA, a former member of the International Conductors Association, and the Worldwide Who's Who.

== Education ==
Cozens began exploring music as a young child. He was playing the piano by ear when he was 3 years old and started music lessons at 11.

Cozen's formal musical education included study in composition, arranging, orchestration, and film scoring at The Berklee College of Music in Boston, MA with George Monseur. Additional composition studies were with Ted Pease, George Cordeiro, John Bavichii and Lother Klein at The University of Toronto. Further orchestration study was with Phil Wilson, Mike Gibbs, Wes Hensel, and Lother Klein at The University of Toronto. Additional study included time at the New England Conservatory of Music auditing classes in composition, The University Of Toronto in composition and orchestration, and McMaster University in mathematics, chemistry, and music.

Cozen's conducting education included two years of private instruction with Victor Feldbrill, Dwight Bennett and time with Russian conductor Konstantin Krimets of the Moscow Symphony Orchestra. His principal piano studies were with Danna Gaky, Reginald Bedford, Avis Romm, and Ray Santisi. He also had occasional coaching from Anton Kuerti. Cozen's principal accordion teacher was Helen Milne (deceased). He also had lessons with Boris Borgstrom.

== Career ==
=== As composer/arranger ===
Labeled by Hugh Fraser, formerly of the Hamilton Spectator, as “one of Canada’s premier arrangers”, Cozens works as a composer and arranger for Canadian orchestras, ensembles, and soloists in the genres of jazz, pop, country, Celtic, classical and crossover. Orchestras in North America and Europe have performed his orchestral arrangements.

Mr. Cozens composition/arranging credits include works for Quartetto Gelato, The Canadian Brass, Rosemary Clooney, Louise Pitre (Mama Mia, Broadway), Michael Burgess (Les Misérables), Hannaford Street Silver Band, The Nylons, Eleanor McCain with David Foster, The Canadian Tenors, The Stratford Festival, and several musicals including "Swingstep".

He has also scored numerous symphonic pops shows including Once Upon a Love Song starring Mark Masri, Bending The Bows starring Ed Minevich and Frank Leahy, Harlem To Hollywood starring Michael Danso, Eagle & Hawk in Concert starring Vince Fontaine, Putting It Together starring The Nylons and Broadway Today. Recently, Cozens completed scoring two innovative concert programs for the Winnipeg Symphony Orchestra; the first for Canadian Country Music star Lindi Ortega, and the second a symphonic pops show for Canada's legendary rock icon Randy Bachman, entitled “Randy Bachman's Symphonic Overdrive.”

Composing, arranging, and conducting credits also include several symphonic recordings with the Moscow Radio Symphony Orchestra and The Russian National Symphony Orchestra at MosFilm studios in Moscow as well as over 100 CDs as conductor, composer, arranger, pianist, and producer for recording labels such as Universal Music Canada, CBC SM 5000, Attic, Somerset Music Inc., Solitudes, Avalon, Reflections, and Jazz Inspiration.

Cozens has also composed, arranged, and conducted many television and film scores for productions including Tek Wars, Ray Bradbury Theatre, The Twilight Zone, At The Midnight Hour, Clarence, Christmas In America and The Long Road Home. He has also composed and produced more than 200 jingles for national brands.

Career highlights include being the arranger for a Command Performance for Queen Elizabeth II in 1984, (London, England) with the Ontario Youth Concert Band, conducted by George Houselander. Cozens was the also the arranger for the Hamilton Sesquicentennial Celebration for Prince Charles, broadcast by CBC Radio in 1996.

=== As conductor ===
Cozens has guest conducted many of Canada's symphony orchestras including The Victoria Symphony, Vancouver Symphony, Edmonton Symphony Orchestra, Calgary Philharmonic, Regina Symphony Orchestra, Winnipeg Symphony Orchestra, Kitchener-Waterloo Symphony, Hamilton Philharmonic Orchestra, Mississauga Symphony, Symphony Nova Scotia, as well as the National Arts Centre Orchestra and members of the Toronto Symphony Orchestra. He has also conducted and recorded in Russia with the Moscow Radio Symphony Orchestra, the Russian National Cinema Orchestra, and members of the Moscow Philharmonic Orchestra.

In April 2013, he made his Cuban debut, guest-conducting the Orquesta de Villa Clara (Villa Clara Symphony Orchestra in Santa Clara, Cuba) in a program of orchestral dance music that included two of his own original compositions, Czardahora and Celtic Fantasia, and his compilation of works by Astor Piazzolla entitled Hommage à Piazzolla, for violin and orchestra.

Cozens has conducted for many classical and classical crossover artists such as The Canadian Tenors, The Canadian Brass, Quartetto Gelato, Michael Guttman, Leslie Kinton and James Anagnoson, Erica Goodman, Michael Burgess, Mark Dubois, Gisele Fredette, Peter DeSotto, and many pop and jazz artists such as Sir Elton John, Janelle Monáe, Randy Bachman, The Nylons, Matt Dusk, P. J. Perry, Carol Wellsman, Jully Black, Divine Brown, Billy Newton-Davis, Shawn Desman, Ryan and Dan, Serena Ryder, Lindi Ortega, Andrea Menard, and Michael Danso.

Other conducting credits include numerous television and film soundtracks, CD recordings, and over 50 theatrical productions, many with Drayton Entertainment and Theatre Aquarius including Fiddler On The Roof, Beauty And The Beast, My Fair Lady, Cats, Miss Saigon, Crazy For You, Anne Of Green Gables, Man Of La Mancha, and The King And I. Television and film conducting includes Tek Wars, Ray Bradbury Theatre, The Twilight Zone, At The Midnight Hour, Clarence, Christmas In America, and The Long Road Home.

Cozens also served as conductor for the Duke of Edinburgh Awards for Prince Philip (Toronto 2004). He also conducted a Command Performance of “Man of La Mancha” for the Governor General of Canada, The Right Honourable Ray Hnytashyn (Theatre Aquarius 1991). More recently in 2012, Cozens conducted the Charles Cozens orchestra for the 25th final presentation of Toronto's Fashion Cares evening, working with such stars as Sir Elton John and Grammy Award-winning singer Janelle Monáe.

=== As performer ===
As an accordionist, Cozens twice won the Open Canadian Accordion Championship in 1968 and 1969, and subsequently represented Canada in the Coupe Mondiale in 1969 in New York City, where he placed among the top ten concert accordionists in the world (Category 4). As a pianist, he has performed many recitals in both classical and jazz genres, including symphonic pops concerts with Henry Mancini, Ertha Kitt, and Cab Calloway.

In 2018, Charles joined the world-touring Canadian classical crossover ensemble Quartetto Gelato as their regular accordionist and the duo JoyRide with oboist Colin Maier.

== Selected collaborations with artists and orchestras ==
As composer, arranger and/or conductor

For a more complete listing of collaborations see Charles Thomas Cozens List of Works.

- 2016 – 2019 The Burlington New Millennium Orchestra series of concerts, Charles Cozens Founder and Conductor
- 2016 The Mozart Effect recordings, 2nd international branding with the Mozart Effect Orchestra, Glenn Gould Studio, Toronto, Ontario, Canada
- 2014 Randy Bachman's Symphonic Overdrive: The Kitchener-Waterloo Symphony, Orchestra London Charles T. Cozens, Conductor/Arranger/Composer, Randy Bachman Guitar/Vocal
- 2008 Eagle and Hawk In Concert as part of the first ever Indigenous Festival: Winnipeg Symphony Orchestra, Charles T. Cozens, Arranger; Alexander Michelwaite, Conductor; Eagle And Hawk, Band
- 1996 The Nylons Live: Vancouver Symphony Orchestra, Charles T. Cozens, Conductor/Arranger; The Nylons, Vocalists

== Selected compositions ==
For a more complete listing of compositions see Charles Thomas Cozens List of Works

Theatre

- 2001 “Swingstep”, A Musical
- 1993 “Peter Pan: The Return.” Book and lyrics by Peter Mandia; music by Cozens; adapted from the play and novel by James M. Barrie. (Theatre Aquarius)

Concert music

- 2013 "Tres Ballos Latinos" for mixed choir, accordion, piano, bass and percussion (commissioned and premiered by Robert Cooper and the Orpheus Choir)
- 2012 "Homage à Piazzolla" for violin and orchestra. A recomposition including arrangements and original composition written for Belgian virtuoso Michael Guttman and premiered in November 2012 with the Regina Symphony Orchestra
- 2010 Czardahora premiered by Michael Guttman
- 2005 “Les Petites Dances Demoniques” (Performed at the Niagara International Chamber Music Festival featuring, Peter Stoll Clarinet and the Adis Bankas String Quartet with Richard Moore, Percussion. Commissioned by Ergo Projects)
- 2000 "Celtic Fantasia" premiered by violinist Michael Guttman in November 2012 and the Regina Symphony Orchestra, Charles Cozens Conductor
- 1999 “The Clown Of Venice” commissioned, premiered, and recorded by Quartetto Gelato on the CD Neopolitan Café
- 1998 “Botanicus” for euphonium and brass band commissioned and premiered by the Hannaford Street Silver Band with Bramwell Tovey

== Selected arrangements ==
- 2007 Arrangements for the Richard Monette Gala and the Stratford Festival Orchestra
- 2002 Arrangements for Stratford Festival's 50th Anniversary
- 2001 The Magic of Love Music by Wolfgang Amadeus Mozart; Arranged and Orchestrated by Charles T. Cozens; Concept and Words by J. Robert Verdun (Port Dover Theatre)

== Selected discography ==
As performer, arranger, composer and/or producer and listed by artist, title, and label

For a more complete listing of recordings see Charles Thomas Cozens List of Works.

- 2017 Charles Cozens, Mozart Effect 16 CDs Spring Hill
- 2015 Quartetto Gelato All Original – 100% Canadian CD Baby
- 2009 The Canadian Tenors The Perfect Gift Universal
- 2009 The Canadian Tenors The Canadian Tenors (USA) Universal
- 2008 Charles Cozens National Parks Solitudes
- 2004 Charles Cozens Balance (Juno Nominated) Reflections

== Awards and honours ==
- 2006 nominated for a Juno Award in the category Instrumental Album of the Year for “Balance” (Somerset – Sony/Universal)
- 2002-2003 Winner of the Established Performing Arts Award by the Mississauga Arts Council
- 2003 Winner of the Bravo VideoFact Award for “Mozart’s Tango” from “The Magic Of Love”
- 2000 Nominated for a Dora Award for Most Outstanding Musical for “Swingstep”
- 1994 Nominated for a Chalmers Award in Composition for Peter Pan: The Return
- 1986 Winner of the Canadian Broadcasting Corporation's National Arrangers Workshop Competition
- 1979 Winner of The Berklee School of Music Work Study Scholarship in Composition
- 1969 Award of Merit World Accordion Championship 1969 (top ten)“Coupe Mondiale” New York, N.Y.
- 1968,1969 Winner of the Open Canadian Accordion Championship in the Artist Repertoire Class

== Articles, lectures, and service ==
- Current vice-president of the board of directors for the Algoma Music Camp (AMC) in association with Algoma University
- Current board member for the Arts and Culture Council of Burlington (ACCOB)
- 2007 Guest Keynote Speaker at the International Conductors Guild Conference in Toronto, Canada, lecturing on “Conducting For The Recording Orchestra”
- 2007 "Glory Days"Playwrights Canada Press (Contributing Author with Bill Freeman)
- 2006 "Broadway North: The Dream Of A Canadian Musical Theatre” Natural Heritage Books (Contributing Author with Mel Atkey)
- Advisory Committee for Humber College, Music Degree Program (Toronto)
- Consultant for Roland Music Corporation
- Former Board member for Canadian Music Competitions (CMC Toronto).
