= List of works by Charles Thomas Cozens =

Charles Thomas Cozens is a Canadian musician born in Hamilton, Ontario. His works span several genres including Classical, Classical Crossover, Jazz, Pop, and New Age.

== List of works ==
=== Select collaborations with artists and orchestras (As composer, arranger and/or conductor) ===
- 2018 – 2019 Symphonic orchestrations for Indian City and Vince Fontaine in association with the Winnipeg Symphony Orchestra, Charles T. Cozens, arranger
- 2016 – 2019 The Burlington New Millennium Orchestra concert series, Charles T. Cozens, founder/conductor
- 2016 The Mozart Effect recordings, 2nd international branding with the Mozart Effect Orchestra, Glenn Gould Studio, Charles T. Cozens, conductor
- 2014 Randy Bachman’s Symphonic Overdrive with The Kitchener-Waterloo Symphony, Orchestra London, Charles T. Cozens, conductor/arranger/composer; Randy Bachman guitar/vocal
- 2014 La Magia Del Cine with The Villa Clara Symphony (Cuba), Charles T. Cozens, conductor/arranger/composer; Janet Horne, violin
- 2013 I Am Andrea Menard with The Regina Symphony Orchestra, Charles T. Cozens, conductor/arranger, Andrea Menard, vocalist
- 2013 La Danza with The Villa Clara Symphony (Cuba), Charles T. Cozens, conductor/arranger/composer; Allejandro Rodriguez, violin
- 2013 Lindi Ortega in Concert with The Winnipeg Symphony Orchestra, Charles T. Cozens, conductor/arranger; Lindi Ortega, vocal/ guitar
- 2013 Broadway Today Revival with The Regina Symphony Orchestra, Charles T. Cozens, conductor/arranger/composer; Stephen Patterson, Gisele Fredette, and Helena Janik, vocalists
- 2013 Canadian Brass with The Regina Symphony Orchestra, Charles T. Cozens, conductor
- 2012 World On A String with The Regina Symphony Orchestra, Charles T. Cozens, conductor/arranger; Michael Guttman, violin
- 2012 Concerts with Fernando Lima, countertenor, and Sarena Paton, soprano, at the Lincoln Alexander Centre (Hamilton, ON), Charles T. Cozens, producer/conductor
- 2010 Putting It Together with The Winnipeg Symphony Orchestra, Charles T. Cozens conductor/arranger; The Nylons, vocalists
- 2008 Eagle and Hawk In Concert as part of the first-ever Indigenous Festival: Winnipeg Symphony Orchestra, Charles T. Cozens, arranger; Alexander Michelwaite, conductor; Eagle And Hawk
- 2006 Quartetto Gelato In Concert with The Toronto Symphony Orchestra, Charles T. Cozens, contributing arranger; Quartetto Gelato
- 2004 From Harlem To Hollywood Revival with The Hamilton Philharmonic Orchestra, Charles T. Cozens, conductor/arranger; Michael Danso, vocalist
- 2004 From Harlem To Hollywood Revival with The Canada Pops Orchestra, Charles T. Cozens, conductor/arranger; Michael Danso, vocalist
- 1996 The Pied Piper with The Mississauga Symphony Orchestra, Charles T. Cozens, conductor/composer/arranger; Denis de Laviolette, narrator/vocalist
- 1996 The Nylons Live with The Vancouver Symphony Orchestra, Charles T. Cozens, conductor/arranger; The Nylons, vocalists
- 1994 Broadway Today with The Hamilton Philharmonic Orchestra, Charles T. Cozens, conductor/arranger/composer/artist
- 1994 Bending The Bows with The Kitchener-Waterloo Symphony, Charles T. Cozens, arranger; Brian Jackson, conductor; Leahy & Minevich, violins
- 1990 From Harlem To Hollywood with The Hamilton Philharmonic Orchestra, Charles T. Cozens, arranger; Boris Brott, conductor; Michael Danso, vocalist

=== Select compositions ===
Musical theatre

- 2001 “Swingstep”, A Musical
- 1993 “Peter Pan: The Return.” Book and lyrics by Peter Mandia; music by Cozens; adapted from the play and novel by James M. Barrie. (Theatre Aquarius)

Concert music

- 2013 "Tres Ballos Latinos" for mixed choir, accordion, piano, bass, and percussion. Commissioned and premiered by Robert Cooper and the Orpheus Choir
- 2012 "Homage à Piazzolla" for violin and orchestra. A recomposition including arrangements and original composition written for Belgian virtuoso Michael Guttman and premiered November 2012 with The Regina Symphony Orchestra
- 2010 "Czardahora" commissioned and premiered by Michael Guttman, violin
- 2005 "Les Petites Dances Demoniques" commissioned by the Niagara International Chamber Music Festival, Ergo Projects
- 2004 "Suite For Children" for Guitar and String Orchestra commissioned by Jason Carter, Helsinki
- 2004 "Marionette Fandangle" commissioned by Acclarion
- 2002–2003 "Suite For Accordion" commissioned by Joseph Macerollo
- 2002 "Fireworks Fantasia" commissioned for the 50th anniversary of the Stratford Festival
- 2002 "Three Musketeers Suite" commissioned and premiered by The Canadian Brass
- 2000 "Celtic Fantasia" premiered by violinist Michael Guttman and commissioned by Lance Elbeck
- 1999 "The Clown Of Venice" commissioned and premiered by Quartetto Gelato.
- 1998 "Glory Days", A play with music about the '46 Stelco strike written with Bill Freeman, author
- 1998 "Botanicus" for euphonium and brass band commissioned and premiered by the Hannaford Street Silver Band with Bramwell Tovey, conductor
- 1994 "Bach Double: Variations" written for Bending the Bows
- 1992 "Scrooge: A Christmas Carol". Book and lyrics by Peter Mandia; music by Cozens; adapted from the play and novel by Charles Dickens, Theatre Aquarius
- 1990 "Orchestral Miniatures" commissioned by Symphonia Canada

=== Select arrangements ===
- 2007 Arrangements for the Richard Monette Gala and the Stratford Festival Orchestra
- 2002 Arrangements for Stratford Festival's 50th Anniversary
- 2001 The Magic of Love Music by Wolfgang Amadeus Mozart; arranged and orchestrated by Charles T. Cozens; Concept and Words by J. Robert Verdun (Port Dover Theatre)

=== Select discography (As performer, arranger, composer and/or producer) ===
- 2017 Charles Cozens, Mozart Effect 16 CDs Spring Hill
- 2015 Quartetto Gelato All Original – 100% Canadian CD Baby
- 2012 RyanDan Imagine Universal
- 2012 Bob Newhart Rudolph Avalon
- 2011 Charles Cozens Aria Solitudes
- 2010 Charles Cozens Peaceful Moonlight Avalon
- 2009 The Canadian Tenors The Perfect Gift Universal
- 2009 The Canadian Tenors The Canadian Tenors (USA) Universal
- 2009 Charles Cozens Holiday Piano Classics Avalon
- 2008 The Canadian Tenors The Canadian Tenors Universal
- 2008 Charles Cozens Timeless Classics Avalon
- 2008 Charles Cozens A Celtic Christmas Reflections
- 2008 Charles Cozens National Parks Solitudes
- 2008 Charles Cozens Sunday Morning Classics Reflections
- 2008 Charles Cozens Hollywood Romance Reflections
- 2007 Charles Cozens Classical Music For Elegant Occasions Reflections
- 2007 Charles Cozens Diamonds Reflections
- 2006 Charles Cozens Relaxing Bach Reflections
- 2006 Charles Cozens Christmas Soprano Avalon
- 2006 Charles Cozens Central Park Solitudes
- 2005 David J. Young Silver Lining Sound of Mind
- 2005 Charles Cozens Romance Avalon
- 2004 Charles Cozens Songbirds At Sunset Solitudes
- 2004 Charles Cozens Balance (Juno Nominated) Reflections
- 2004 Acclarion Marionette Fandangle Independent
- 2004 Erica Goodman Angelic Harp Avalon
- 2003 Quartetto Gelato The Orient Express Linus
- 2003 Charles Cozens Santa’s Symphony Avalon
- 2003 Lance Elbeck Fiddle On Fire Eclectic
- 2002 Charles Cozens Andrew Lloyd Webber Reflections
- 2002 Charles Cozens Movie Romance Avalon
- 2002 Canadian Cast CD The Magic Of Love Eclectic
- 2001 Quartetto Gelato Neapolitan Cafe Linus
- 2000 Canadian Cast CD Swingstep Silver Fox
- 2000 Canadian Cast CD The Three Musketeers Stratford
- 2000 Morag Be Free M • E Records
- 1999 Hannaford Street Band Heavy Metal CBC SM 5000
- 1999 Quartetto Gelato Espresso Victor (Japan)
- 1998 Morag For The Moment Makin' Music
- 1997 Charles T. Cozens The Entrance Independent
- 1995 Michael Farquharson Picture Time Jazz Inspiration
- 1994 Michael Farquharson Michael Farquharson Jazz Inspiration
- 1993 Bending The Bows Bending The Bows Take A Bow
- 1993 Symphonia Canada Orchestral Landscapes 3 Attic Records
- 1992 Symphonia Canada Orchestral Landscapes 2 Attic Records
- 1991 Symphonia Canada Orchestral Landscapes 1 Attic Records
- 1987 Helix Wild In The Streets Capitol
- 1986 Symphony Nova Scotia With Glowing Hearts CBC SM 5000
