= Francis Nicholson Darke =

Canadian politician

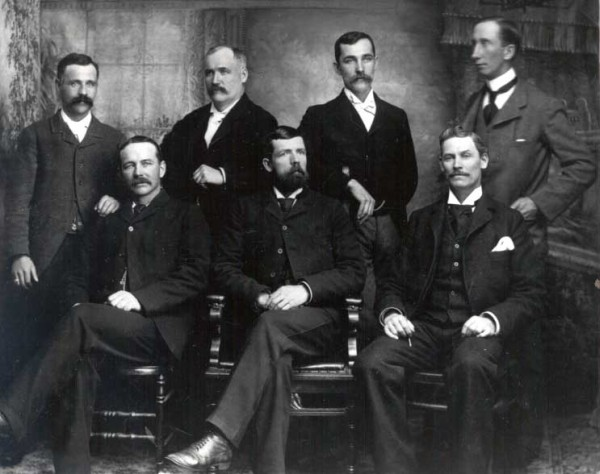
Darke with the 1896 Regina Town Council, third left, top row

Francis Nicholson Darke (October 25, 1863 – July 17, 1940) was a leading citizen of Regina, Saskatchewan and served as Mayor of Regina, Member of Parliament and as a prominent businessman.

He was born near Charlottetown, Prince Edward Island on his family's farm, remaining there until his late 20s when he decided to move to Western Canada. He arrived in Regina in 1891 and settled there permanently after returning to PEI to marry.

He partnered with fellow islander Pople Balderson to raise livestock on a farm outside of Regina. Later, the two men purchased a butcher's shop in town and were soon able to obtain contracts with residential schools and the North-West Mounted Police.

Darke invested his earnings to purchase several blocks of land in town from the Canadian Pacific Railway. His real estate holdings were profitable enough to allow him to sell his cattle business in order to focus on land development.

He was elected to town council in 1895 and served as mayor in 1898 at the age of 35 and remains Regina's youngest ever mayor.

Darke was elected to the House of Commons of Canada in the 1925 federal election as a Liberal MP for Regina electoral district but resigned his seat in early 1926 in order to allow Saskatchewan Premier Charles Avery Dunning to enter the federal parliament in a by-election after he was appointed Finance Minister in the federal cabinet.

Darke donated $85,000 and raised a further $40,000 to help establish Regina College in 1910. The college eventually became the University of Regina. He also donated money in 1929 to build the Darke Hall for Music and Art which served as the home of the Regina Symphony Orchestra for 41 years.

Darke Crescent, Darke Street, Darke Park and Darke Hall in Regina are named after him.

Parliament of Canada
Preceded by William Richard Motherwell	Member of Parliament for Regina; 1925–1926	Succeeded by Charles Avery Dunning
