= Ronald Kessler =

American journalist and non-fiction author (born 1943)

- Kessler in 2005
- Born: Ronald Borek; December 31, 1943 (age 82); New York City, U.S.
- Occupations: Journalist, author
- Children: 2
- Relatives: Ernest Borek (father); Minuetta Kessler (mother); Morris C. Shumiatcher (uncle)
- Writing career
- Language: English
- Period: 1964–present
- Subjects: Intelligence, current affairs
- Website: www.ronaldkessler.com

Ronald Borek Kessler (born Ronald Borek; December 31, 1943) is an American journalist and author of 21 non-fiction books about the White House, U.S. Secret Service, FBI, and CIA.

== Early life and education ==
Kessler was born in The Bronx, New York City, the son of microbiologist Ernest Borek and concert pianist Minuetta Kessler, and grew up in Belmont, Massachusetts. After his parents divorced and his mother remarried, he adopted his step-father's last name. He attended Clark University in Worcester, Massachusetts, from 1962 to 1964, where he was a student reporter for the campus newspaper The Scarlet and exposed racial housing discrimination in a report that prompted state anti-discrimination regulations.

== Career ==
Kessler began his career in 1964 as a reporter with the Worcester Telegram, followed by three years as an investigative reporter and editorial writer with the Boston Herald. A series he wrote while there was instrumental in the installation of a better plaque commemorating the location of Boston's Pre-Revolutionary-War Liberty Tree. During these years, his reporting won awards from the American Political Science Association (public affairs reporting award, 1965), United Press International (1967) and the Associated Press (Sevellon Brown Memorial award, 1967). In 1968, he joined The Wall Street Journal as an investigative reporter in the New York bureau.

From 1970 to 1985, Kessler was an investigative reporter for The Washington Post. In 1972, he won a George Polk Memorial award for Community Service because of two series of articles he wrote—one on conflicts of interest and mismanagement at Washington area non-profit hospitals, and a second series exposing kickbacks among lawyers, title insurance companies, realtors, and lenders in connection with real estate settlements, inflating the cost of buying homes. That series resulted in congressional passage in 1974 of the Real Estate Settlement Procedures Act (RESPA), which outlaws kickbacks for referral of settlement services in connection with real estate closings. Kessler was named a Washingtonian of the Year for 1972 by Washingtonian magazine. In 1979, Kessler won a second Polk Award for National Reporting for a series of articles exposing corruption in the General Services Administration; he won even though his editor, Ben Bradlee, had not submitted his stories for consideration. Kessler's Washington Post stories reporting that Lena Ferguson had been denied membership in the Daughters of the American Revolution (DAR) because she is black led to her acceptance by the DAR, appointment to head the DAR Scholarship Committee, and widespread changes in the organization's policies to increase membership by blacks.

In 2006, Kessler became chief Washington correspondent for conservative cable news company Newsmax, where he became a leading promoter of Donald Trump. He left his position at Newsmax in 2012 citing "editorial changes", but has continued to write articles for the site. In 2014, Franklin Pierce University awarded Kessler the Marlin Fitzwater Medallion for excellence as a prolific author, journalist, and communicator.

=== Author ===
Kessler has authored 21 nonfiction books on intelligence and current affairs. Seven of these, Inside the White House (1995), The Season: Inside Palm Beach and America's Richest Society (1999), A Matter of Character (2004), Laura Bush (2006), In the President's Secret Service: Behind the Scenes With Agents in the Line of Fire and the Presidents They Protect (2009), The Secrets of the FBI (2011), and The First Family Detail: Secret Service Agents Reveal the Hidden Lives of the Presidents (2014) have reached The New York Times Best Seller list for hardcover non-fiction.

Kessler's 1993 book, The FBI: Inside the World's Most Powerful Law Enforcement Agency, led to the dismissal by President Clinton of William S. Sessions as FBI director over his abuses. According to The Washington Post, "A Justice Department official ... noted that the original charges against Sessions came not from FBI agents but from a journalist, Ronald Kessler [who uncovered the abuses while writing a book about the FBI, leading to Sessions' dismissal by President Clinton] ..." The New York Times said Kessler's FBI book "did indeed trigger bureau and Justice Department investigations into alleged travel and expense abuses [by FBI Director William Sessions, leading to his departure] ..., but also noted that the hastily published book included a claim it called "Sensational but unexplained, the assertion borders on the irresponsible."

Kessler's 1996 book The Sins of the Father about Joseph P. Kennedy received negative reviews. The Washington Post called it "relentlessly uncharitable", a "sour and mean-spirited book", noting that "the author frequently resorts to speculation, guesswork and innuendo. This has the effect of making many of his attacks seem underhanded." New York Times reviewer Michiko Kakutani called it a "meanspirited, speculation-filled biography ... a determinedly poisonous portrait of the man." Despite reaching the New York times bestseller list, Kessler's 1999 book The Season: Inside Palm Beach and America's Richest Society received "tepid, if not stinging, reviews" and received criticism from some Palm Beach locals that it did not portray their town accurately.

In his 2002 book The Bureau: The Secret History of the FBI, Kessler presented the first credible evidence that Bob Woodward's and Carl Bernstein's Watergate source dubbed Deep Throat was FBI official W. Mark Felt. The book said that Woodward paid a secret visit to Felt in California and had his limousine park ten blocks away from Felt's home and walked to it so as not to attract attention. The New York Times said the book offers an "understanding of the institution's history, as well as an account of what it is like to be on the inside ... Kessler investigates the relationship between FBI directors and sitting presidents and also includes exclusive interviews with Robert Mueller, who led the FBI in the period immediately after 9/11." Jon Stewart of The Daily Show said Kessler's 2007 book The Terrorist Watch: Inside the Desperate Race to Stop the Next Attack is a "very interesting look inside the FBI and CIA, which I think is unprecedented." The Washington Times said of the book, "Ronald Kessler is a veteran Washington-based investigative journalist on national security. His unparalleled access to top players in America's counterterrorism campaign allowed him a rare glimpse into their tradecraft, making The Terrorist Watch a riveting account."

Kessler's 2009 book, In the President's Secret Service: Behind the Scenes With Agents in the Line of Fire and the Presidents They Protect, was described by USA Today as a "fascinating exposé ... high-energy read ... amusing, saucy, often disturbing anecdotes about the VIPs the Secret Service has protected and still protects ... [accounts come] directly from current and retired agents (most identified by name, to Kessler's credit) ... Balancing the sordid tales are the kinder stories of presidential humanity ..." Newsweek said of the book, "Kessler's such a skilled storyteller, you almost forget this is dead-serious nonfiction ... The behind-the-scenes anecdotes are delightful, but Kessler has a bigger point to make, one concerning why the under-appreciated Secret Service deserves better leadership." However, the Washington Post review called its revelations "boring and familiar", noting "What is truly dangerous is the kind of National Enquirer-style gossip in Kessler's book" as "the author simply milked the agents for the juiciest gossip he could get and mixed it with a rambling list of their complaints."

Kessler's 2011 book The Secrets of the FBI presents revelations about the Russian spy swap, Marilyn Monroe's death, Vince Foster's suicide, the raid on Osama bin Laden's compound, and J. Edgar Hoover's sexual orientation. It tells how the FBI caught spy Robert Hanssen in its midst and how secret teams of FBI agents break into homes, offices, and embassies to plant bugging devices without getting caught and shot as burglars. However, The Washington Post review said "There are tidbits here that probably do qualify as 'secrets'. But there's a lot of padding too: ... None of this is to say that Secrets of the FBI is not a gossipy, easy-to-gobble book; it is. In places it almost reads like 'The FBI for Dummies'."

Kessler's 2014 book The First Family Detail: Secret Service Agents Reveal the Hidden Lives of the Presidents debuted at No. 4 on the hardcover nonfiction New York Times Best Seller list. In the book Kessler reports that Vice President Joe Biden enjoys skinny dipping, which offends female agents, and that being assigned to his detail is considered to be the second worst protective assignment in the Secret Service after Hillary Clinton's detail. The book also reveals that the Secret Service covered up the fact that President Ronald Reagan's White House staff overruled the Secret Service to let unscreened spectators get close to Reagan as he left the Washington Hilton, allowing John W. Hinckley Jr. to shoot the president. However, Marc Ambinder's review in The Week called the book's details "salacious" and "cringe-worthy", noting a "surprising number of weird inaccuracies" that led him to believe "Kessler seems to have listened to his sources, written their words down, and then simply printed as fact their allegations or observations without checking on them."

Kessler's 2018 book was The Trump White House: Changing the Rules of the Game. The Washington Post's review, by Hugh Hewitt, called the book "trustworthy, and, in an unusual twist these days, it's favorable to the president. ... Kessler also got Trump to sit down for an interview on New Year's Eve at Mar-a-Lago, a conversation that shows the president confident and comfortable in his role. ... Kessler conveys Trump's world in coherent, readable fashion, and provides the players' assessments of one another."

=== Articles ===
Kessler has written The Washington Post, The Wall Street Journal, Time, The Washington Times, and Politico opinion pieces, including "Surveillance: An American Success Story" on Politico, "Reform the Secret Service" in The Washington Post, and "The Real Joe McCarthy," which attacked efforts by some conservative writers to vindicate the late Senator Joseph McCarthy, and in The Wall Street Journal. Kessler's op-ed "Time to Rename the J. Edgar Hoover Building" detailed Hoover's "massive abuses and violations of Americans' rights" as FBI director for nearly 50 years.

In a Time magazine opinion piece, Kessler wrote "The Secret Service Thinks We Are Fools" after the White House intrusion based on his book The First Family Detail.

On January 4, 2010, Kessler wrote a Newsmax article revealing that the Secret Service allowed a third uninvited guest to attend President Obama's state dinner for Indian Prime Minister Manmohan Singh besides party crashers Tareq and Michaele Salahi on November 24, 2009. The Washington Post said, "Kessler reported that the agency discovered the third crasher after examining surveillance video of arriving guests and found one tuxedoed man who did not match any name on the guest list."

In an article for Newsmax, on March 16, 2008, Kessler incorrectly reported that Senator Barack Obama attended a service at Chicago's Trinity United Church of Christ on July 22, 2007, during which Jeremiah Wright gave a sermon that blamed world suffering on "white arrogance". The Obama campaign denied that Obama had attended the church on the day that sermon was delivered and other reporters discovered that Obama was in fact in transit to Miami, Florida on that day. Shortly after the controversy broke, Kessler confirmed to Talking Points Memo that he attempted to remove information documenting it from his English Wikipedia biography.

In "A Roadmap to Trump's Washington," Kessler described the carrot-and-stick approach Trump used to get his Mar-a-Lago estate approved as a club by Palm Beach Town Council members and predicted he would operate in the same manner as president to win over support for his agenda. In "The Anatomy of a Trump Decision," Kessler depicted how Trump makes decisions by focusing on his decision to turn his Mar-a-Lago estate in Palm Beach into a private club.

=== Criticism ===
Kessler's writings have been criticized in publications such as The Washington Post and The Week for overt partisanship and a lack of journalistic rigor.

Every book ever written has mistakes. But experts are supposed to get the main things right, and reporters generally follow through when someone tells them something. Too often, Kessler seems to have listened to his sources, written their words down, and then simply printed as fact their allegations or observations without checking on them.

— Marc Ambinder, The Week, August 6, 2014

In a note to The Week, Kessler disputed charges of inaccuracy, including uncertainty over whether then-Vice President Joe Biden had spent a million dollars of taxpayer funds to take personal trips on Air Force Two back and forth between Washington and his home in Wilmington. The publication agreed to update Ambinder's article, saying that "... author Ronald Kessler provided The Week with documentation from the Air Force about Vice President Biden's travel" and linked to the Air Force's letter responding to Kessler's Freedom of Information Act request with the official record of Biden's flights back and forth between Washington and Wilmington with their cost as listed in Kessler's book The First Family Detail.

Noting Kessler's extraordinary access to the then Secret Service Director, Mark Sullivan, during the writing of In The President's Secret Service, James Bamford wrote in a review in The Washington Post that:

... in light of an odd decision by the current director, Mark Sullivan, the motto should be changed to "Have You Heard This One?" During the Bush administration, hoping for some good, ego-enhancing publicity, Sullivan broke with his agency's long-standing policy of absolute silence and allowed Ronald Kessler to get an earful. The chief Washington correspondent for Newsmax.com, which bills itself as "the #1 conservative news agency online," Kessler had written very positive books about CIA Director George Tenet, first lady Laura Bush and President George W. Bush, and Sullivan was probably hoping for the same treatment. Hearing that Sullivan had given Kessler his blessing, scores of current and former agents -- Kessler claims more than 100 -- agreed to talk to him. But rather than use that wealth of information to write a serious book examining the inner workings of the long-veiled agency or the new challenges of protecting the first black president, the author simply milked the agents for the juiciest gossip he could get and mixed it with a rambling list of their complaints.

— James Bamford, The Washington Post, August 23, 2009

A September 30, 2014 Politico piece by Kessler on Secret Service blunders, including allowing a knife-wielding intruder to race into the White House and failing to detect gun shots at the White House until four days later, was criticized by Josh Marshall of Talking Points Memo for allegedly implying that because he had not taken steps to correct the problems within the agency by replacing the director, President Obama would be at fault if the Secret Service's security breakdowns led to his own assassination. A subsequent editor's note called that a misinterpretation. The reference in question said, "Agents tell me that it's a miracle an assassination has not already occurred. Sadly, given Obama's colossal lack of management judgment, that calamity may be the only catalyst that will reform the Secret Service."

According to the U.S. Senate Select Committee on Intelligence report on CIA torture and the report itself as reported in The New York Times, Kessler's book, The CIA at War, "included inaccurate claims about the effectiveness of CIA interrogations" provided by the CIA to Kessler and New York Times reporter Douglas Jehl, such as the claim that the arrests of terrorist suspects were based on information from interrogations of other terrorists under torture. The report said this rationale was used to justify the use of torture. In a comment to The New York Times, Kessler said he corroborated what he was told with the FBI, and he called the Senate report discredited because it was written only by Democratic lawmakers and did not include interviews with many of the main players. Subsequently, John Brennan, President Obama's appointee as CIA director, said that while no one knows whether the information could have been obtained otherwise, "[o]ur review indicates that interrogations of detainees on whom EITs [enhanced interrogation techniques] were used did produce intelligence that helped thwart attack plans, capture terrorists, and save lives."

== Personal life ==
Kessler is married and has two children. He met Donald Trump while writing his book about Palm Beach and has since said he considers him a personal friend, leading others to call him Trump's "No. 1 Cheerleader".

== Books ==
Title	Year	ISBN	Publisher	Subject matter	Interviews, presentations, and reviews	Comments
The Life Insurance Game: How the Industry Has Amassed Over $600 Billion at the Expense of the American Public	1985	ISBN 9780030705076	Henry Holt & Co.	Life insurance		
The Richest Man in the World: The Story of Adnan Khashoggi	1986	ISBN 9780446513395	Warner Books	Adnan Khashoggi		
Spy vs. Spy: Stalking Soviet Spies in America	1988	ISBN 9780684189451	Charles Scribner's Sons	Soviet espionage in the United States		
Moscow Station: How the KGB Penetrated the American Embassy	1989	ISBN 9780684189819	Charles Scribner's Sons	Embassy of the United States, Moscow	Interview with Kessler on Moscow Station, February 23, 1989, C-SPAN	
The Spy in the Russian Club: How Glenn Souther Stole America's Nuclear War Plans and Escaped to Moscow	1990	ISBN 9780684191164	Charles Scribner's Sons	Glenn Souther		
Escape from the CIA: How the CIA Won and Lost the Most Important Spy Ever to Defect to the U.S.	1991	ISBN 9780671726645	Pocket Books	Vitaly Yurchenko		
Inside the CIA: Revealing the Secrets of the World's Most Powerful Spy Agency	1992	ISBN 9780671734572	Pocket Books	Central Intelligence Agency		
The FBI: Inside the World's Most Powerful Law Enforcement Agency	1993	ISBN 9780671786571	Pocket Books	Federal Bureau of Investigation	Booknotes interview with Kessler on Inside the FBI, September 12, 1993, C-SPAN	
Inside the White House: The Hidden Lives of the Modern Presidents and the Secrets of the World's Most Powerful Institution	1995	ISBN 9780671879204	Pocket Books	United States Secret Service		
The Sins of the Father: Joseph P. Kennedy and the Dynasty He Founded	1996	ISBN 9780446518840	Warner Books	Joseph P. Kennedy Sr., Kennedy family		
Inside Congress: The Shocking Scandals, Corruption, and Abuse of Power Behind the Scenes on Capitol Hill	1997	ISBN 9780671003852	Pocket Books	United States Congress	Washington Journal interview with Kessler on Inside Congress, May 26, 1997, C-SPAN	
The Season: Inside Palm Beach and America's Richest Society	1999	ISBN 9780060193911	HarperCollins	Palm Beach, Florida	Presentation by Kessler on The Season: Inside Palm Beach, October 10, 1999, C-SPAN	
The Bureau: The Secret History of the FBI	2002	ISBN 9780312304027	St. Martin's Press	Federal Bureau of Investigation	Presentation by Kessler on The Bureau: The Secret History of the FBI, June 5, 2002, C-SPAN	
The CIA at War: Inside the Secret Campaign Against Terror	2003	ISBN 9780312319328	St. Martin's Press	Central Intelligence Agency, George Tenet		
A Matter of Character: Inside the White House of George W. Bush	2004	ISBN 9781595230003	Sentinel	George W. Bush, Presidency of George W. Bush	Presentation by Kessler on A Matter of Character, August 11, 2004, C-SPAN	
Laura Bush: An Intimate Portrait of the First Lady	2006	ISBN 9780385516211	Doubleday	Laura Bush	Presentation by Kessler on Laura Bush: An Intimate Portrait of the First Lady, April 19, 2006, C-SPAN	
The Terrorist Watch: Inside the Desperate Race to Stop the Next Attack	2007	ISBN 9780307382139	Crown Publishing	War on terror	Presentation by Kessler on The Terrorist Watch, November 19, 2007, C-SPAN; The Daily Show interview with Kessler on The Terrorist Watch, March 12, 2008	
In the President's Secret Service: Behind the Scenes With Agents in the Line of Fire and the Presidents They Protect	2009	ISBN 9780307461353	Crown Publishing	United States Secret Service	The Daily Show interview with Kessler on In the President's Secret Service, August 2, 2009; Washington Journal interview with Kessler on In the President's Secret Service, August 22, 2009, C-SPAN	
The Secrets of the FBI	2011	ISBN 9780307719690	Crown Publishing	Federal Bureau of Investigation		
The First Family Detail: Secret Service Agents Reveal the Hidden Lives of the Presidents	2014	ISBN 9780804139212	Crown Publishing	United States Secret Service	Presentation by Kessler on The First Family Detail, October 8, 2014, C-SPAN	
The Trump White House: Changing the Rules of the Game	2018	ISBN 9780525575719	Crown Publishing	First presidency of Donald Trump	Washington Journal interview with Kessler on The Trump White House, April 10, 2018, C-SPAN; After Words interview with Kessler on The Trump White House, April 27, 2018, C-SPAN; Presentation by Kessler on The Trump White House, April 6, 2019, C-SPAN	
