= Jacqueline Shumiatcher =

Canadian philanthropist (1923–2021)

- Born: Jacqueline Fanchette Clotilde Clay; April 29, 1923; Vendin-le-Vieil, Pas de Calais, France
- Died: February 1, 2021 (aged 97)
- Other names: Jacqui Shumiatcher
- Known for: Arts patron, philanthropist
- Spouse: Morris C. Shumiatcher
- Awards: Order of Canada (2017); Saskatchewan Order of Merit (2001)

Jacqueline Fanchette Clotilde Clay Shumiatcher, CM SOM (April 29, 1923 – February 1, 2021) was a Canadian philanthropist, arts patron, and art collector. She and her husband Morris C. Shumiatcher began supporting the arts community in Regina, Saskatchewan, shortly after their marriage in 1955, an endeavor which she continued since Morris' death in 2004. The couple were avid collectors of Inuit art and artwork by local artists. In 2014 she donated 1,310 Inuit sculptures and paintings by the Regina Five, worth an estimated C$3 million, to the University of Regina. She received many honours and awards, including the Saskatchewan Order of Merit in 2001 and the Order of Canada in 2017.

== Early life and family ==
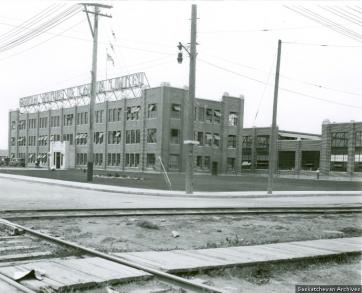
General Motors factory in Regina, 1928

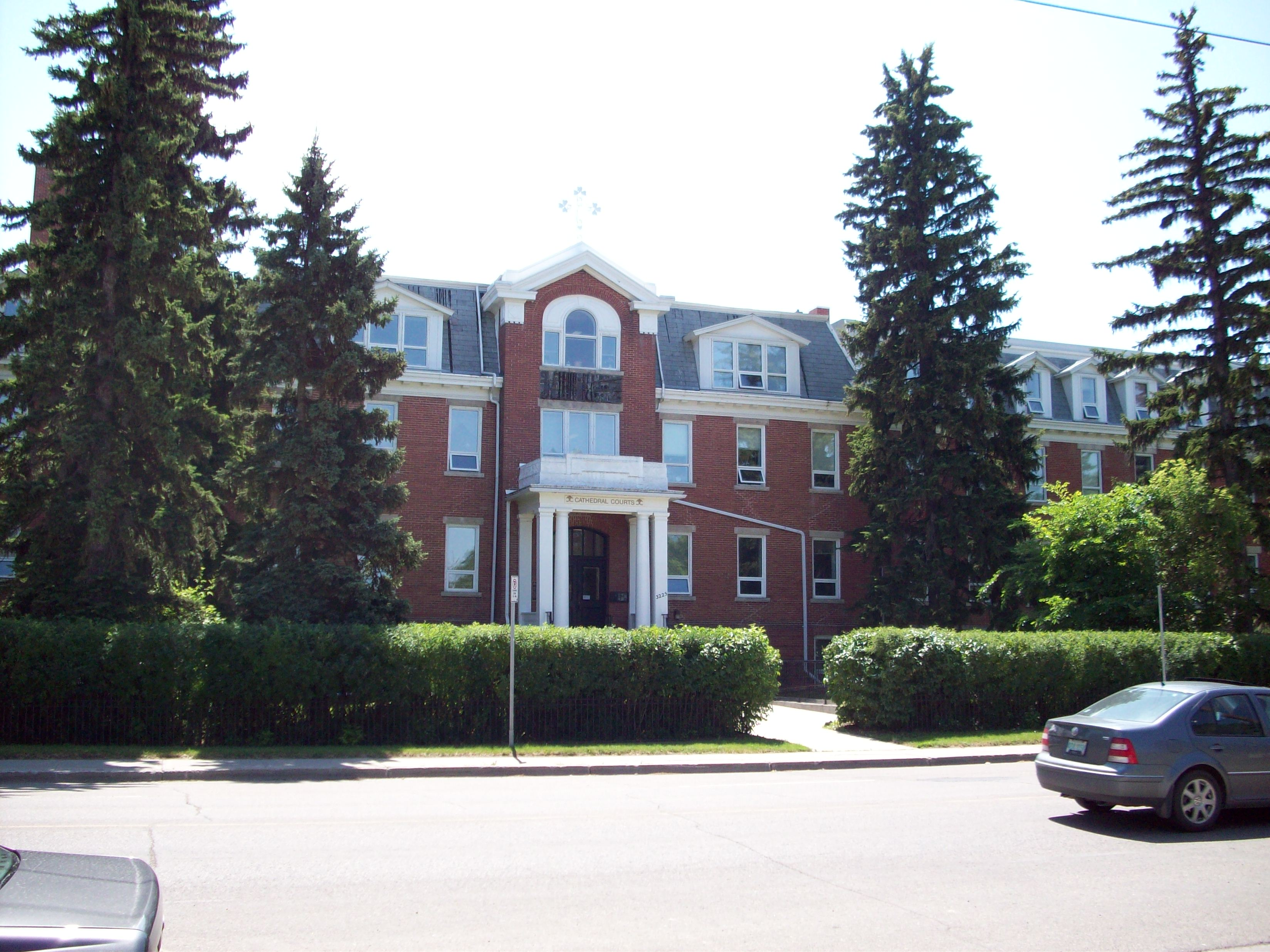
Former site of the Sacred Heart Academy

Jacqueline Fanchette Clotilde Clay was born on April 29, 1923, in Vendin-le-Vieil, Pas de Calais, France. Her parents were Archibald Franklin Clay and Rose Jeanne Clay (née Souillart). She has a younger brother. Her British-born father moved to Canada before she was four and she, her mother, and brother followed him to the North Central neighborhood of Regina, Saskatchewan, in 1927. Her father found work at the Regina General Motors factory and later as a bank clerk. The family was poor and lived in a disadvantaged neighborhood, with unpaved roads, boarded sidewalks, and no indoor plumbing. Archibald designed a primitive system to collect and pump rainwater into their home. They also lacked a telephone and car.

She graduated from the Kitchener School and Scott Collegiate high school. In 1940 she began working at the Sacred Heart Academy as a teacher of typing and shorthand for $1 a day. This was followed by a series of jobs in different fields, including auditing in the Simpsons department store, night work in the meteorology department at Regina International Airport during World War II, work in a mortgage company and bank, and executive secretarial work at Scott Collegiate.

In 1947 she applied for a job as secretary to Morris C. Shumiatcher, Q.C., legal counsel to Premier of Saskatchewan Tommy Douglas. After leaving this position, she continued to assist Shumiatcher in overseeing his affairs while he was out of town and setting up his law office when he returned. They married in 1955. She then founded Managerial Services Ltd. to supply secretarial and managerial help for her husband's legal practice.

== Philanthropy ==
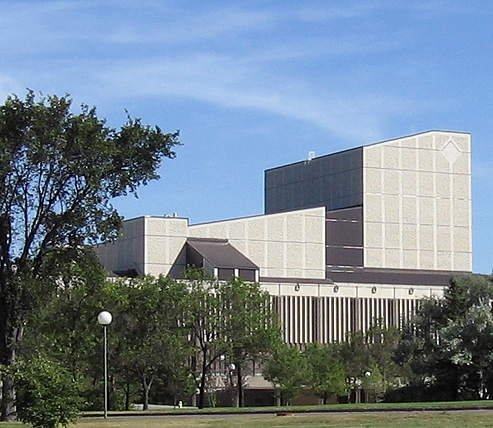
Conexus Arts Centre

The Shumiatchers began supporting the arts community in Regina shortly after their marriage. Since her husband's death in 2004, Shumiatcher continued to make donations in both their names.

Among the Shumiatchers' endowments are:

- The Shumiatcher Open Stage at the University of Regina, also known as the Shu-Box, a teaching theatre with expandable seating from 134 to 162
- The Jacqui Shumiatcher Room at the Conexus Arts Centre
- The Shumiatcher Lobby and Shumiatcher Sandbox Series, both at the Globe Theatre
- The Shumiatcher Pops Series at the Regina Symphony Orchestra
- The Shumiatcher Sculpture Court, featuring Inuit art donated by the couple, and the Shumiatcher Theatre, both at the MacKenzie Art Gallery
- The Morris and Jacqui Shumiatcher Scholarship in Law at the University of Saskatchewan
- The Drs. Morris and Jacqui Shumiatcher Regina Book Award for the Saskatchewan Book Awards

Beneficiaries of the Shumiatchers' philanthropy include: the Regina Symphony Orchestra, the Globe Theatre, the Regina Little Theatre, the University of Regina theatre and music departments, New Dance Horizons, Juventus Choir, the Youth Ballet Company of Saskatchewan, Do it With Class Young People's Theatre Company, Regina Lyric Musical Theatre, Prairie Opera, Opera Saskatchewan, and the MacKenzie Art Gallery.

Non-arts beneficiaries include: the Companion Animal Health Fund at the Western College of Veterinary Medicine, the Regina Humane Society, the Regina YWCA, the Saskatchewan Science Centre, the Saskatchewan Federated Indian College, the Regina Council of Women, and the Women's Business and Professional Club.

== Inuit art collection ==
The Shumiatchers began collecting Inuit art in the mid-1950s, building their collection through acquisitions and gifts they gave to each other. In October 1981 the Norman Mackenzie Art Gallery mounted an exhibition of 96 sculptures and 23 prints, representing about one-quarter of their collection at that time.

By 2013, the collection was estimated at some 2,000 pieces. In 2014 Jacqui Shumiatcher gave 1,310 pieces valued at C$3 million, including Inuit sculptures and paintings by the Regina Five, to the University of Regina.

== Memberships and affiliations ==
Shumiatcher was a past chair of the National Conference of Canadian Clubs and the legal committee of the Regina Council of Women. She was a past president of the Women's Canadian Club of Regina, the Regina Musical Club, and the Regina Film Club. As of 2017 she sat on the board of trustees of the Government House Foundation. She has served on the board of governors of the Dominion Drama Festival and the Regina Symphony Orchestra, and was a former executive member of the Women's Business and Professional Association.

She was named an honorary member of the Canadian Actors' Equity Association in recognition of her contribution to theatre and the performing arts in Canada. She has volunteered as a docent at the MacKenzie Art Gallery, speaking to schoolchildren about French Impressionism and Inuit art.

== Honours and awards ==
Shumiatcher has received many honours and awards in recognition of her philanthropy and support of the Regina arts community. In 1996 she was named a Woman of Distinction by the Regina YWCA, and in 1999 she was named Citizen of the Year by B'nai Brith Canada. She received the Saskatchewan Order of Merit, the province's highest award, in 2001. She received the Queen Elizabeth II Golden Jubilee Medal in 2003. The City of Regina named her Citizen of the Year in 2004. In 2017 she was inducted into the Order of Canada, Canada's highest civilian honor.

She was awarded an honorary Doctor of Laws degree from the University of Regina in 2002.

In honour of her 80th birthday in 2003, the Regina Symphony Orchestra presented a concert of big band music, including compositions by Benny Goodman, Glenn Miller, and Duke Ellington. Her 90th birthday party was also held at the Conexus Arts Centre.

== Personal life ==
She and her husband, Morris C. Shumiatcher (1917–2004), were childless. They were members of the Beth Jacob synagogue. Morris was also awarded the Order of Canada in 1981 and the Saskatchewan Order of Merit in 1997. Their home in Regina, purchased in 1956 and expanded in 1979, features an extensive art gallery. She died on February 1, 2021, at the age of 97.
