= Darke Hall =

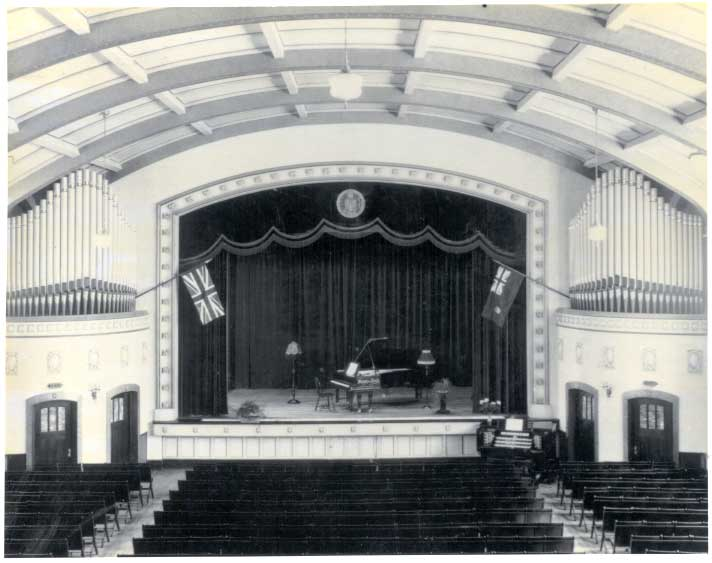
- Interior of Darke Hall. It remains the principal concert and lecture venue on the Old Campus of the University of Regina. Note organ pipes on auditorium side of the stage wings.
- Interactive map of Darke Hall
- Address: Ramsey Drive, Regina, Saskatchewan, Canada
- Coordinates: 50.43993°N 104.61219°W
- Type: Theatre

Construction
- Built: 1928
- Opened: 1929
- Renovated: 2020
- Architect: J.H. Puntin

Darke Hall is a 470 seat performance hall located in Regina, Saskatchewan, Canada. The hall was named for Francis Nicholson Darke, the former mayor of Regina. Designed by architect J.H. Puntin, the hall was built in 1928 and had its inaugural concert opening on 6 January 1929. While the hall currently serves as the main performance venue for the Conservatory of Music at the University of Regina, for many years the venue was the city of Regina's main concert hall and the home of the Regina Symphony Orchestra. That changed after the Saskatchewan Centre of the Arts opened in 1970.

Many notable entertainers have performed at Darke Hall, including Barra MacNeils, Jorge Bolet, Jane Coop, Denise Djokic, Marjorie Lawrence, Nino Martini, Nan Merriman, Jan Peerce, Sarah Slean, Teresa Stratas, Jean Watson, Hawksley Workman, and Efrem Zimbalist.
