= Minuetta Kessler =

Russian-Canadian pianist (1914–2002)

Background information
- Born: Minuetta Shumiatcher; September 5, 1914; Gomel, Russian Empire
- Died: November 30, 2002 (aged 88) Belmont, Massachusetts, U.S.
- Genres: Classical
- Occupations: Composer, concert pianist, music teacher, author
- Instrument: Piano

Minuetta Shumiatcher Borek Kessler (September 5, 1914 – November 30, 2002) was a Russian-born Canadian and later American concert pianist, classical music composer, and educator. A child prodigy, she performed her first composition at a recital at the age of 5 in Calgary, Alberta, Canada, and went on to study at the Juilliard School in New York City. She composed hundreds of pieces, including music for piano, violin, voice, flute, clarinet and cello, as well as for chamber ensembles. She performed all over Canada and in Boston and New York, including performances at Carnegie Hall and The Town Hall, and with the Boston Civic Symphony and the Boston Pops. The New York Times called her "a rare phenomenon among the younger pianists of today – more musician than pianist". She also taught musical composition to young children, creating and patenting a game called "Staftonia" for this purpose.

== Early life and education ==
She was born Minuetta Shumiatcher in Gomel, Russia, the eldest child of Abraham Isaac Shumiatcher, a lawyer who attended the University of Alberta Faculty of Law and was appointed a Queen's Counsel, and his wife, Luba Lubinsky, a graduate of the University of Warsaw who worked as a tutor for children in Calgary, Alberta, Canada. Her parents had moved to Calgary before her birth, but her mother was visiting her native country when Minuetta was born. Her paternal grandfather, Judah Shumiatcher, is said to have brought the first Torah scroll to Calgary. A paternal uncle, Morris Shumiatcher, founded SmithBilt Hats, which manufactured the famed white cowboy hats that became a symbol of Calgary. She had a younger brother, Dr. Morris C. Shumiatcher, QC, who became a noted Canadian lawyer.

Minuetta was recognized as a child prodigy at the age of 5, when she performed her own composition in a piano recital held by the studio of John M. Williams and Shaylor Turner. According to a reviewer, her performance was "one of the surprises of the evening", as she "played her own composition in a most expressive manner". The following year, at age 6, she performed another original composition at the annual recital, which also featured her aunt, 10-year-old Bella Shumiatcher. At the latter recital, a reviewer wrote, "The precocity of this six year old is surprising".

She went on to study piano under Gladys McKelvie Egbert in Calgary. At the age of 15 she received a full scholarship to study at the Juilliard School in New York City, where she studied under Ernest Hutcheson and Ania Dorfmann. She also studied composition under Ivan Langstroth at Juilliard. She graduated from Juilliard in 1934 and engaged in post-graduate studies until 1936, as well as taught piano at Juilliard for several years. She became a naturalized U.S. citizen around 1940.

== Music career ==
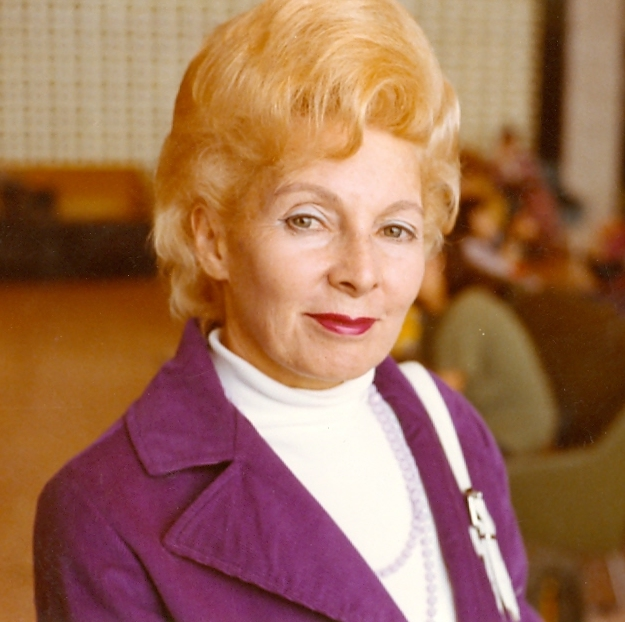
Minuetta Kessler in 2000

=== Pianist and composer ===
Kessler made her U.S. debut at The Town Hall in New York City in 1945. She went on to perform more than 50 solo concert programs on WNYC. She played at Carnegie Hall with the Boston Civic Symphony and with the Boston Pops. In March 1962 she performed in a program featuring all of her own compositions at the Boston Conservatory of Music. The Canadian Broadcasting Corporation featured her performances in its Distinguished Artists and Masters of the Keyboard series. She was recorded playing her own compositions on "Music for Solo Instruments" (1978, AFKA SK-288) and "Childhood Cameos" (1981, AFKA SK-4663). She continued to perform into her seventies.

Kessler composed hundreds of pieces, including music for piano, violin, voice, flute, clarinet and cello, as well as for chamber ensembles. One of her most acclaimed compositions was the Alberta Concerto for Piano and Orchestra, which she premiered on CBC Radio in 1947 and went on to perform with orchestras across Canada and in Boston. In 1975 she performed the piece with the Century Calgary Symphony Orchestra in honor of Calgary's centennial celebrations.

=== Technique ===
The Boston Globe described her keyboard technique as "formidable" and The Christian Science Monitor praised her "dash and verve" and "ear for color". After the 1947 premiere of her Alberta Concerto for Piano and Orchestra, the L'Événement-Journal wrote that she "plays with a power rarely attained by women pianists". Her 1975 reprisal of the Alberta Concerto with the Calgary Century Symphony Orchestra generated this review by the Calgary Albertan:

Minuetta Kessler is a most refined pianist and her own Alberta Concerto is in every sense a work of great magnitude. It is a kind of 19th-century romantic piece in four movements in which Kessler's hands were most effectively used. She played with authority, feeling and sensitivity.

=== Piano teacher and lecturer ===
Kessler moved to Cambridge, Massachusetts in 1952; the following year she and her second husband, Dr. Myer M. Kessler, relocated to Belmont, Massachusetts, where she lived the rest of her life. She operated her own publishing company, Music Resources, from her home.

She taught piano in her home in Belmont until 1998, when she began experiencing memory problems. She specialized in teaching musical composition to young children, creating and patenting a game called "Staftonia" (1960) for this purpose. She also used a "simplified notational system" called "Dash-a-Notes" in her music primer, Piano Is My Name (1975). In the late 1970s and early 1980s she published numerous composition books, including Savory Suite (1980), The Improper Grasshopper (1980), Cat 'n Mouse Tails (1981), Playful Squirrels (1981), A Day in the Park (1981), Jewish Easy Piano Pieces (1981), My Toys (1982), and Come to the Circus! (1984).

Kessler lectured and conducted workshops for music teachers, and wrote articles for such publications as The American Music Teacher, the Christian Science Monitor, Clavier, Massachusetts Music News, and Piano Guild Notes.

== Memberships ==
Kessler co-founded the New England Jewish Music Forum in 1958. She also helped establish Concerts in the Home and Friends of Young Musicians. She served as president of the New England Piano Teachers' Association (1965–1967), the American Women Composers of Massachusetts, and the Massachusetts Music Teachers Association (1979–1981). She belonged to the Beth El Temple Center in Belmont.

== Awards and honors ==
Kessler was a two-time recipient of the CAPAC Prize, for her "New York Suite" in 1946 and "Ballet Sonatina" in 1947. She was given the key to the city of Calgary in 1951, and was named the Alberta Outstanding Woman Composer and Musician in 1955. She received Composer awards from the Brookline Library Music Association in 1957 and the National Federation of Music Clubs in 1975. In 1979 she was made an honorary member of the Boston chapter of Sigma Alpha Iota, a musicians' fraternity. In 1984 the Music Teachers National Association awarded her their first Master Teachers Certificate Diploma.

In 1988 the National League of American PEN Women awarded her first prize in their national contest for left hand piano pieces, for her composition "Evocation: For the left hand alone" (Op. 158 No. 3).

She was listed in Who's Who in the East (1959), International Encyclopedia of Women Composers (1987), Two Thousand Notable Americans (1989), International Who's Who in Music and Musicians Directory (1996), and the World Who's Who of Women (1992–3), as well as The National Golden Book – Distinguished Women of the U.S.A., Who's Who of American Jewry, National Social Directory, and International Who's Who in Community Service.

== Personal life ==
In 1936, she married Ernest Borek, a microbiologist and professor of biochemistry at City College of New York and later, Columbia University College of Physicians and Surgeons. They had one son, Ronald Kessler (né Borek), a journalist and author. In September 1952 she remarried to Myer M. Kessler, a physicist at MIT, with whom she had a daughter.

Kessler died at her home in Belmont on November 30, 2002, at the age of 88, and was interred at Sharon Memorial Park.
