= In the President's Secret Service =

2009 book by Ronald Kessler

In the President's Secret Service: Behind the Scenes with Agents in the Line of Fire and the Presidents They Protect
- Author: Ronald Kessler
- Language: English
- Genre: Political journalism
- Publisher: Crown Publishing
- Publication date: August 4, 2009
- Publication place: United States
- Media type: Print (Hardcover)
- Pages: 288
- ISBN: 978-0-307-46135-3
- OCLC: 316029354

In the President's Secret Service: Behind the Scenes with Agents in the Line of Fire and the Presidents They Protect is a book by Ronald Kessler, published on August 4, 2009, detailing the United States Secret Service involvement in protecting the president of the United States. The book is based on interviews with more than 100 current and former secret service agents.

The book reveals that during Barack Obama's term the threats on the life of the president increased by 400% compared to his predecessor. Also, Obama has not given up smoking according to the agents interviewed to the book – contrary to what the public has believed after Obama said not to be smoking in the White House at the beginning of his term. The book also makes numerous other previously unpublicized allegations about the personal life of many 20th century United States presidents and their families, as related by their personal security personnel.

The book was reviewed positively by USA Today as a "fascinating exposé ... high-energy read ... amusing, saucy, often disturbing anecdotes about the VIPs the Secret Service has protected and still protects ... [accounts come] directly from current and retired agents (most identified by name, to Kessler's credit) ... Balancing the sordid tales are the kinder stories of presidential humanity ..." and by Newsweek, who said, "Kessler's such a skilled storyteller, you almost forget this is dead-serious nonfiction ... The behind-the-scenes anecdotes are delightful, but Kessler has a bigger point to make, one concerning why the under-appreciated Secret Service deserves better leadership." However, the Washington Post review called its revelations "boring and familiar", noting "What is truly dangerous is the kind of National Enquirer-style gossip in Kessler's book" as "the author simply milked the agents for the juiciest gossip he could get and mixed it with a rambling list of their complaints."
