= Bella Shumiatcher =

- Born: February 9, 1911; Gomel, Russia
- Died: 1990 (aged 78–79); Ridgefield, Connecticut, USA
- Education: Institute of Musical Art, 1932–1935; Juilliard Graduate School; Teachers College, Columbia University
- Spouse: Hy Abbey
- Children: 2 Musical career
- Genres: Classical, folk
- Occupations: Pianist, music educator
- Instrument: Piano
- Parent(s): Judah and Chassia Shumiatcher

Bella Shumiatcher (February 9, 1911 – 1990) was a Russian–Canadian–American pianist and music educator. She was the founder and director of the Shumiatcher School of Music in Larchmont, New York, and a faculty member of the Juilliard School, her alma mater.

== Early life and education ==
Bella Shumiatcher was born on February 9, 1911, in Gomel, Russia, the youngest of 11 children of Judah and Chasia Shumiatcher. Her father and brother homesteaded briefly in Rumsey, Alberta, before the rest of the family joined them in Calgary in August 1911. At age 10 Bella performed in a piano recital organized by the studio of John M. Williams and Shaylor Turner; her niece, six-year-old Minuetta Shumiatcher, also performed. Bella and Minuetta both went on to attend the Juilliard School, while two of Bella's sisters, Fanny (Ziskin) and Sarah (Weiner), also pursued musical careers in New York.

In 1932 Bella enrolled in a four-year course at the Institute of Musical Art, the predecessor to the Juilliard School, in New York City. She completed the program in two and a half years, graduating in 1935. She studied under Egon Petri, Ernest Hutcheson, Nadia Reisenberg, and Alfred Mirovitch at the Juilliard Graduate School. She studied music education under Rosalyn Tureck and earned her teaching certificate at Columbia University Teachers College.

== Musical career ==
Shumiatcher performed both in concert and on radio. She was the featured pianist at a December 11, 1938 concert at Carnegie Hall, performing a variety of musical styles. On January 25, 1959, she performed on a WNYC radio program titled Keyboard Masters, and on April 22 of that year she appeared on WPIX-TV demonstrating "The Teaching of Theme and Variation Form".

== Music educator ==
Shumiatcher founded and directed the Shumiatcher School of Music, a community music school in Larchmont, New York. The curriculum included instrumental and vocal music, and theatre. The school trained children ages 3 to 8 using the Suzuki method. The school presented free annual recitals featuring students and faculty. A January 1973 music festival at the New York Public Library for the Performing Arts included a morning violin concert for children, performed by students of the school, and an afternoon piano recital for adults, presented by a faculty member. Shumiatcher was the soloist in a March 8, 1974 concert at the same venue, and performed in a June 7, 1976 concert. She also performed in a 1977 chamber music concert and a 1984 benefit recital, among others.

Shumiatcher was a faculty member of the Juilliard School for 35 years. She was also on the faculty of New York University and taught at the State University of New York at Purchase.

== Personal life ==
Shumiatcher married three times. She had a son and daughter with her second husband, Hy Abbey.

== Sources ==
- Handel, Bea; Spencer, Janet W. (1978). The National Directory for the Performing Arts/Educational. Wiley. ISBN 9780471033042.
- Jewish Historical Society of Southern Alberta (1996). Land of Promise: The Jewish Experience in Southern Alberta. The Society. ISBN 1-55056-457-9.
- Joffe, Jay; Fischbein, Maxine (2007). A Joyful Harvest: Celebrating the Jewish Contribution to Southern Alberta Life, 1889-2005. Jewish Historical Society of Southern Alberta. ISBN 978-0978247805.
