= Claudio Vena =

Italian composer

Claudio Vena is an Italian-born composer for film and television, now living and working in Canada.

== Compositions ==
Vena has written the score for the feature film, Silver Man and co-written another score for Boy Meets Girl. Two of his arrangements also were featured in the film Only You. He has scored numerous documentaries. He was presented with a Gemini award for Best Original Music Score for a Documentary Program or Series, for his score to T.O. in the series 24. Vena has also written scores for Johnny Lombardi, The Great Communicator, a documentary about the founder of CHIN radio, as well as an original score for the CBC Radio Drama, The Wanderers. From 2001 till 2005, his music was used as the Logo music of the CBC TV News programmes The National, Canada Now & The main network news. He has composed scores for theatre productions including original scores for Romeo & Juliet, directed by Vikki Anderson for Canadian Stage and Peter Pan, directed by Tim Carroll, in 2010 as well as Hamlet, directed by Adrian Noble, in 2008 for The Stratford Shakespeare Festival. For the 2013 season of The Stratford Shakespeare Festival, Claudio wrote a Victorian score for Romeo & Juliet. In 2000 he wrote a score for the play Words In The Dark, written by Italian playwright Paolo Pupo.

== Conducting and arranging ==
His first major debut as conductor and arranger was with the leading baritone of the Met, Louis Quilico, when he recorded a CD of Italian art songs called Recordi d'Italia. He was the Music Director/conductor for the Huronia Symphony between 1991 - 95 as well as holding posts as Assistant Conductor for The Hart House Orchestra between 1987-1997 and the Toronto production of Miss Saigon between 1993-1995. He also founded the Hart House String Ensemble. He has written symphony shows for soprano Mary Lou Fallis, tenor Robert Pilon, guitarist Robert Michaels and Quartetto Gelato.

== Recording and producing ==
His solo CDs released are, La Vita E Un Circo, Peter Pan Soundtrack and Romeo & Juliet. He cofounded the group Quartetto Gelato. During his 10 year tenure with QG, Claudio won NPR's Debut Artist of the Year and received 2 Juno nominations. The first 3 recordings of QG, Quartetto Gelato, Rustic Chivalry and Aria Fresca. As a producer, he has produced 3 CDs for Catherine Wilson's Ensemble Vivant as well as having a hand in the production of QG's first 3 CDs.

== Performing ==
Vena was the electric violist/mandolinist with the progressive rock group FM. He has appeared on stage as a violinist/violist/accordionist with Mark Masri, The Canadian Tenors, Justin Hines, Alfie Zappacosta, Jim Cuddy, and many other performers.
