= Alexander Sevastian =

Belarusian-Canadian accordionist of Armenian origin

Alexander "Sasha" Mikhailovich Sevastian
- Born: October 2, 1976; Minsk, Belarus
- Died: February 16, 2018 (aged 41) Ajijic, Mexico
- Genres: Classical, Classical crossover, Folk music
- Occupations: Soloist, and Musician with Quartetto Gelato
- Instruments: Accordion, bayan, piano, bandoneon

Alexander "Sasha" Sevastian (October 2, 1976 – February 16, 2018) was a well-known virtuoso Belarusian-Canadian accordionist.

He was born on October 2, 1976, in Minsk, Belarus where he started, at age seven, to play the accordion. Sevastian was the oldest child of Nadya, a computer engineer, and Mikhail, a chemist, and amateur accordionist. Much of Sevastian's education and very early career was in Russia. In April 2001, he moved to Canada, finished his education, and joined the well-known Canadian ensemble Quartetto Gelato. In 2004, he returned to Russia to marry Anna (Anya) Budennaya and bring her back to Canada to start a family. Sevastian became a Canadian citizen in 2005.

After moving to Canada, over the next 16 years, Sevastian won four major accordion competitions, including the well-known world championship the Coupe Mondiale in 2007 in Washington DC representing Canada. He also developed an extensive worldwide solo career, and continued to perform in Quartetto Gelato.

In interviews, Sevastian spoke of his desire to more popularize the accordion and was always "an indefatigable accordion ambassador", encouraging the creation of new works by major composers, and more performance opportunities for accordion in music festivals. He performed in a wide variety of music styles including classical, both original and transcriptions, also frequently performing Argentinian tangos, French waltzes, gypsy tunes, and newly commissioned works. On four occasions, he performed with known American accordionist Cory Pesaturo, including at both US accordion organizations festivals (AAA & ATG).

Sevastian died suddenly of a massive heart attack at age 41 on Friday, February 16, 2018, while on tour with Quartetto Gelato in Mexico. Major Canadian news organizations reported on his death, including CBC Radio One and The Globe and Mail.

== Education ==
A native of Minsk, Belarus, his formal accordion studies began at the local Glinka State Musical College, where his teacher was Miron Boula. After graduating, Sevastian then went to the Gnessin State Musical College in Moscow to study with the renowned performer and pedagogue Friedrich Lips.

In July 1998, Alexander worked with Professor Elsbeth Moser and met and played for Sofia Gubaidulina at her master class in Avignon, France.

After graduating from the Gnessin State Musical College in 2002 with a master's degree in Performance, Sevastian, now living in Toronto, Canada, finished his Advanced Certificate in Performance from the University of Toronto studying with well-known Canadian accordionist Joseph Macerollo.

Also in 2002, Sevastian joined Quartetto Gelato.

== Career ==
While he was a student, from 1996 to 2001, Sevastian joined the Russian Radio Orchestra in Moscow, and with the support of the conductor Nikolai Nekrasov he became a featured soloist touring throughout Russia, Ukraine, Germany, Italy, and Japan.

From 2002 until 2018, as a member of the mixed instrument classical crossover ensemble Quartetto Gelato, Sevastian recorded five CDs, and toured every province in Canada, almost every state in the US, and many countries around the world including Russia, Korea and Mexico, The Bahamas, and Guatemala. With this ensemble, Sevastian performed traditional classical and folk works for accordion, as well as arrangements and new compositions.

In November 2002 he made his solo debut under Boris Brott as a soloist with the Hamilton Philharmonic, and then in April 2008, debuted with the Toronto Symphony under the baton of Peter Oundjian, performing the Malcolm Forsyth Accordion Concerto at the New Creations Festival. He went on to perform this work with the orchestra on their 2009 tour of Eastern Canada. He later performed as soloist with the Calgary Philharmonic Orchestra as well with other orchestras in Canada including Victoria, Quebec City, Kelowna, Kamloops, Windsor, Edmonton, Mississauga, Nanaimo, as well as Charleston and Sioux City in the U.S.A.

After winning the Coupe Mondiale International Accordion Competition in 2007, his fourth major competition win, his solo recital career blossomed. He toured extensively, performing often at prestigious music festivals in Canada, and in Russia, Belarus, Ukraine, Germany, Japan, Mexico, Italy, Portugal, Serbia, and the US.

Highlights of his career included appearances in the Tchaikovsky Concert Hall, Glinka Capella Hall (St.Petersburg), Suntory Hall (Tokyo), Minato Mirai Hall (Yokohama), Roy Thomson Hall (Toronto), Jack Singer Hall (Calgary) and Metropolitan Museum of Art (New York).

Sevastian gave several premier performances of new works, including ones by Russian and Polish composers Sergey Berinsky, Mikhail Bronner, Vladimir Nikolaevich Korolchuk, Władysław Żeleński and Japanese composer Jo Kondo.

Before his death, he had begun playing with Toronto's Payadora Tango Ensemble and was also acting as a promoter, bringing in musicians from Russia including Bayan Mix.

== Awards ==
- The Oslofjord (Norway 1998) – first place
- Cup of the North (Russia 2000) – first place
- Antony Galla-Rini Accordion Competition (USA 2001) – first place
- Coupe Mondiale International Accordion Competition (Washington D.C., USA 2007) – first place

== Discography ==
Solo

- 2011 Russian Favourities
- 2013 Tango Dreams
- 2017 J.S. Bach Famous Works (Arranged for Accordion)

Quartetto Gelato

- 2004 Quartetto Gelato Travels the Orient Express
- 2005 Favourite Flavours
- 2009 Musica Latina
- 2010 The Magic of Christmas
- 2015 All Original – 100% Canadian

== Videography ==
Quartetto Gelato

- CBC's Canada Day 2004: Merci Montreal! (2004)
- Quartetto Gelato Explores Music and Wine DVD (2006)
- Romanian Caravan (2010)
- Border Crossing (2012)
- Liza's Dream (2016)
