= Vladimir Conta =

Romanian conductor and pianist

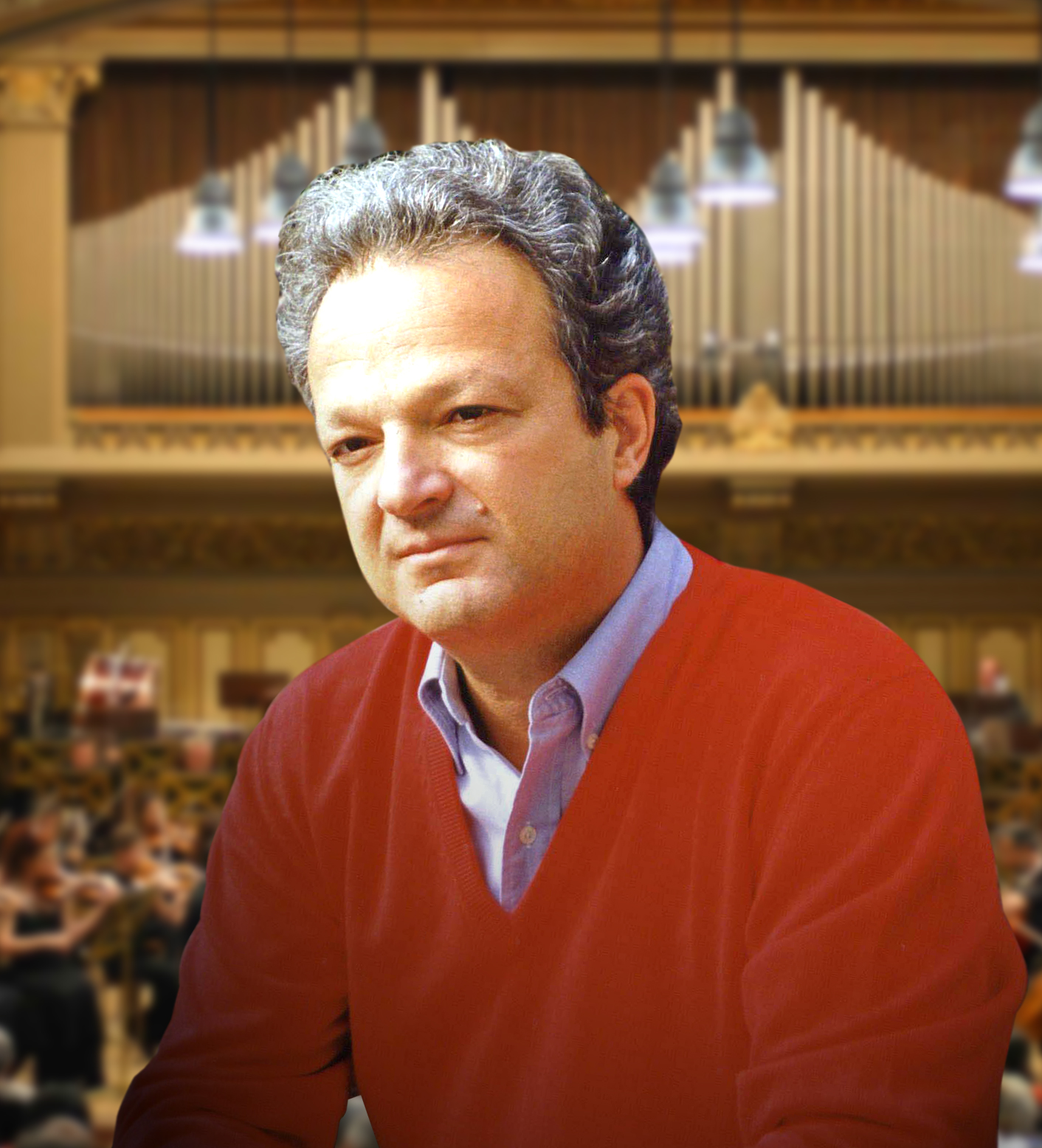
Vladimir Conta

Vladimir (Vlad) Conta (born 20 January 1954) is a Romanian conductor and pianist with an international career spanning 30 years. He was the Principal Conductor of the Regina Symphony Orchestra in Canada. He has been a Principal Conductor at the Romanian National Opera, Bucharest, since 2001.

He made his American debut in 1997 with pianist Radu Lupu and the National Symphony Orchestra in a series of concerts in Washington, D.C. His London debut came in 2000, when he conducted the Philharmonia Orchestra in several concerts at the Royal Festival Hall featuring the Russian pianist Mikhail Pletnev.

Conta was born in Arad, Romania and is the son of the conductor Iosif Conta.
