= Ernest Borek =

Hungarian-American professor, researcher and author (1911–1986)

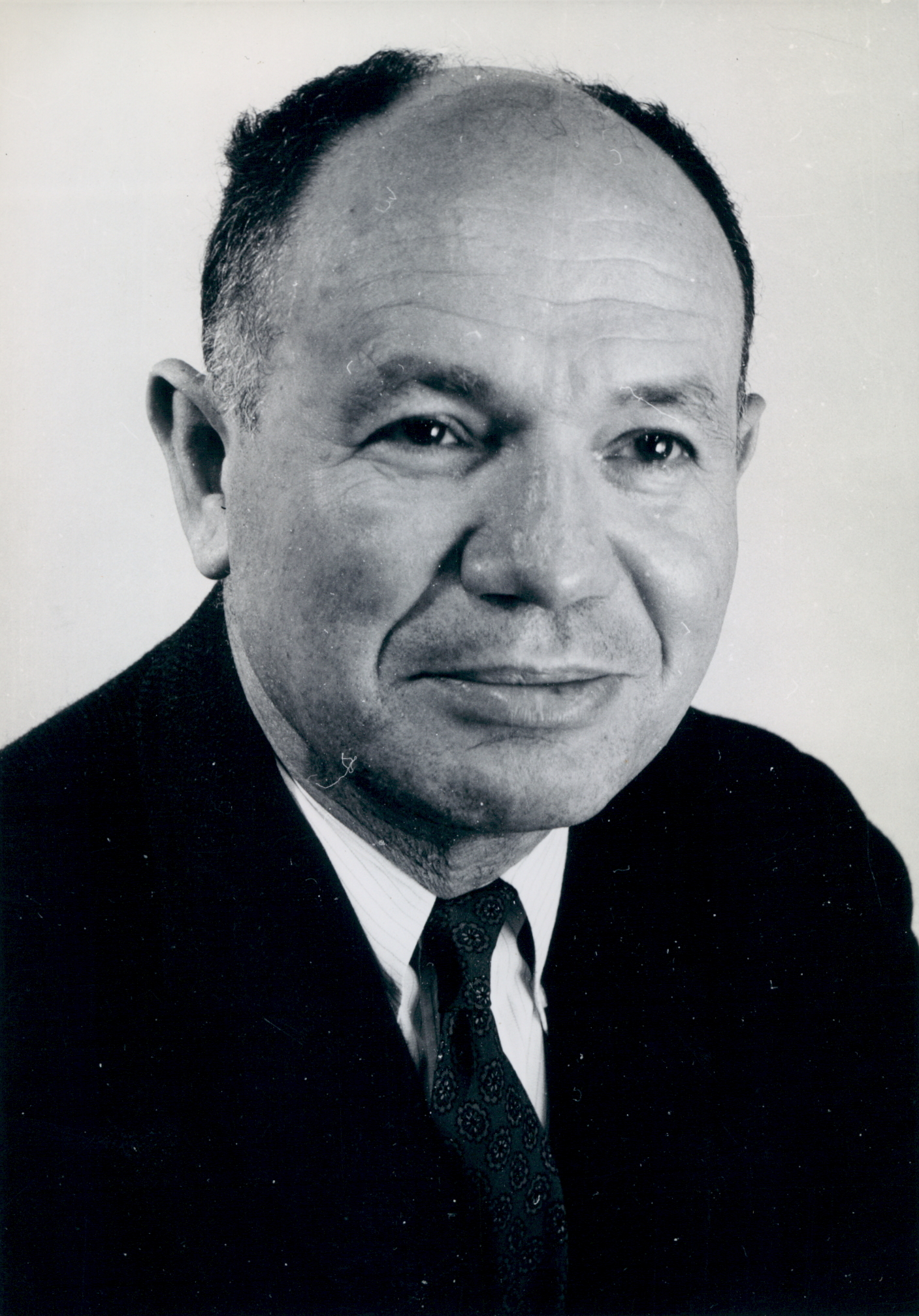
- Born: May 25, 1911; Nyírcsászári, Hungary
- Died: February 14, 1986 (aged 74)
- Education: PhD, biochemistry, Columbia University
- Children: 3 including Ronald Kessler
- Scientific career
- Fields: Microbiology, biochemistry, cancer research

Ernest Borek (May 25, 1911 – February 14, 1986) was a Hungarian-American microbiologist, university professor, cancer researcher, and author. He was a professor at City University of New York (1934–1969) and Columbia University College of Physicians and Surgeons (1955–1969). He was chairman of the Colorado Regional Cancer Center's Support Review Committee of the National Cancer Institute.

== Early life and education ==
Born in Nyírcsászári, Hungary, Ernest Borek moved with his family to New York City at the age of 14. He graduated from the City College of New York and obtained his PhD in biochemistry from Columbia University.

== Scientific career ==
Borek was on the faculty of the Department of Chemistry of the City University of New York from 1934 to 1969 and was a professor in the Department of Biochemistry of Columbia University from 1959 to 1969. His activities in cancer research led to his appointment as chairman of the Department of Molecular Biology at AMC Cancer Research Center. He also served as director of the Colorado Regional Cancer Center and was chairman of the Cancer Center's Support Review Committee of the National Cancer Institute. In 1969, he accepted an appointment as professor in the department of Microbiology at the University of Colorado Health Sciences Center.

In 1962, with Erwin Fleissner, Borek showed that methyl groups in RNA that are essential in various biological roles in coding, decoding, regulation, and expression of genes are introduced to RNA by methylating enzymes at the macro-molecular level. Borek's subsequent studies led to the discovery of DNA methylating enzymes as well. Building on that work and the work of others, the vaccines introduced in late 2020 to immunize against COVID-19 use messenger RNA to trigger the immune system to produce protective antibodies without using actual bits of the virus.

On March 22, 1964, The New York Times ran a page one article on a new unified theory of cancer development proposed by Borek and his Columbia University associate Dr. P. R. Srinivasan. The theory ties together all classes of known cancer-causing agents by a single, common mechanism of action through which normal cells are turned into malignant cells.

== Author ==
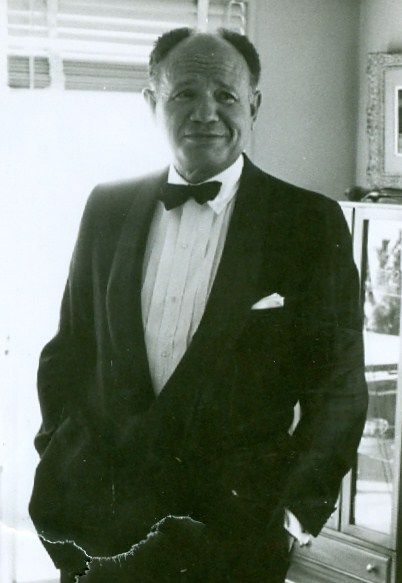
Borek

Borek was the author of four popular books for the non-scientist, Man, the Chemical Machine (1952), The Atoms Within Us (1961), The Code of Life (1965), and The Sculpture of Life (1973), which describes the history and development of biochemistry and molecular biology. The Atoms Within Us has been translated into all major languages and received the Thomas Alva Edison Foundation Award for the best science book for the public in 1961. In addition to over 125 scientific publications in refereed journals and many reviews, he contributed essays to newspapers and scientific journals describing the problems of original thinkers in science.

Reviewing Borek's The Atoms Within Us, Isaac Asimov wrote in the New York Times Book Review, "The book is a careful and correct picture, within the limits it sets for itself, of the state of modern biochemistry and how it came to be what it is. If you know nothing about the subject in the first place, here is where you might start".

Noting skepticism that greeted some of his ultimately successful scientific discoveries in cancer research, Borek wrote in an essay for the M.D. Anderson symposium in Houston:

It is not surprising as it may at first appear that scientists should be reluctant to accept new ideas. A truly new idea is one of the most unpalatable impositions a man can inflict on his fellow men. A new idea assaults the vanity of the recipient. If it is a valid and worthy idea, why did he not think of that? Obviously, therefore, every new idea must be subjected to critical scrutiny".

== Awards and honors ==
Borek was awarded the Medal of the Society of Biological Chemists of Finland in 1965. He also received the Townsend Harris Medal for distinguished alumni of the City University of New York in 1968, and was awarded an honorary M.D. degree from the University of Szeged, Hungary.

The City College of New York offers the annual Ernest Borek Scholarship, funded by his sister Irene Marsh, to undergraduate and graduate students "who show promise in chemistry or biochemistry".

== Personal life ==
Borek died in Denver on February 14, 1986, at the age of 74.
