= Conexus Arts Centre =

Performing arts centre in Regina, Canada

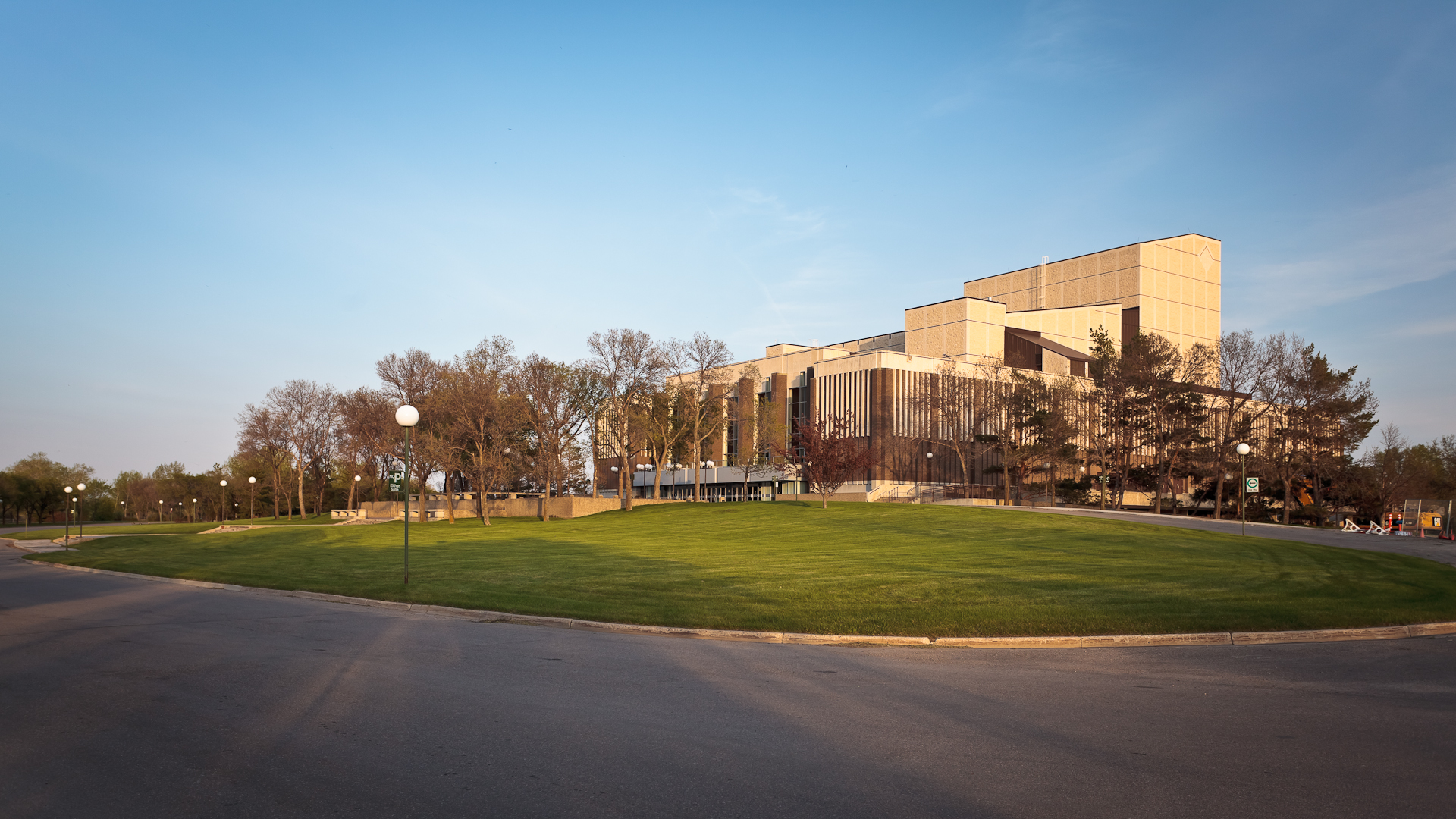
- Conexus Arts Centre
- Interactive map of Conexus Arts Centre
- Former names: Saskatchewan Centre of the Arts
- Location: 200A Lakeshore Drive; Regina, Saskatchewan, Canada
- Coordinates: 50°25′42.01″N 104°35′52.41″W
- Capacity: 2,031
- Type: Performing arts center

Construction
- Opened: August 24, 1970

Website
- www.conexusartscentre.ca

The Conexus Arts Centre, known from 1970 till 2006 (and still largely known) as the Saskatchewan Centre of the Arts, is a theatre complex located within Wascana Centre in Regina, Saskatchewan, Canada, which largely replaces former theatres downtown and Darke Hall on the original campus of Regina College, also in Wascana Centre but north of Wascana Lake.

== History ==
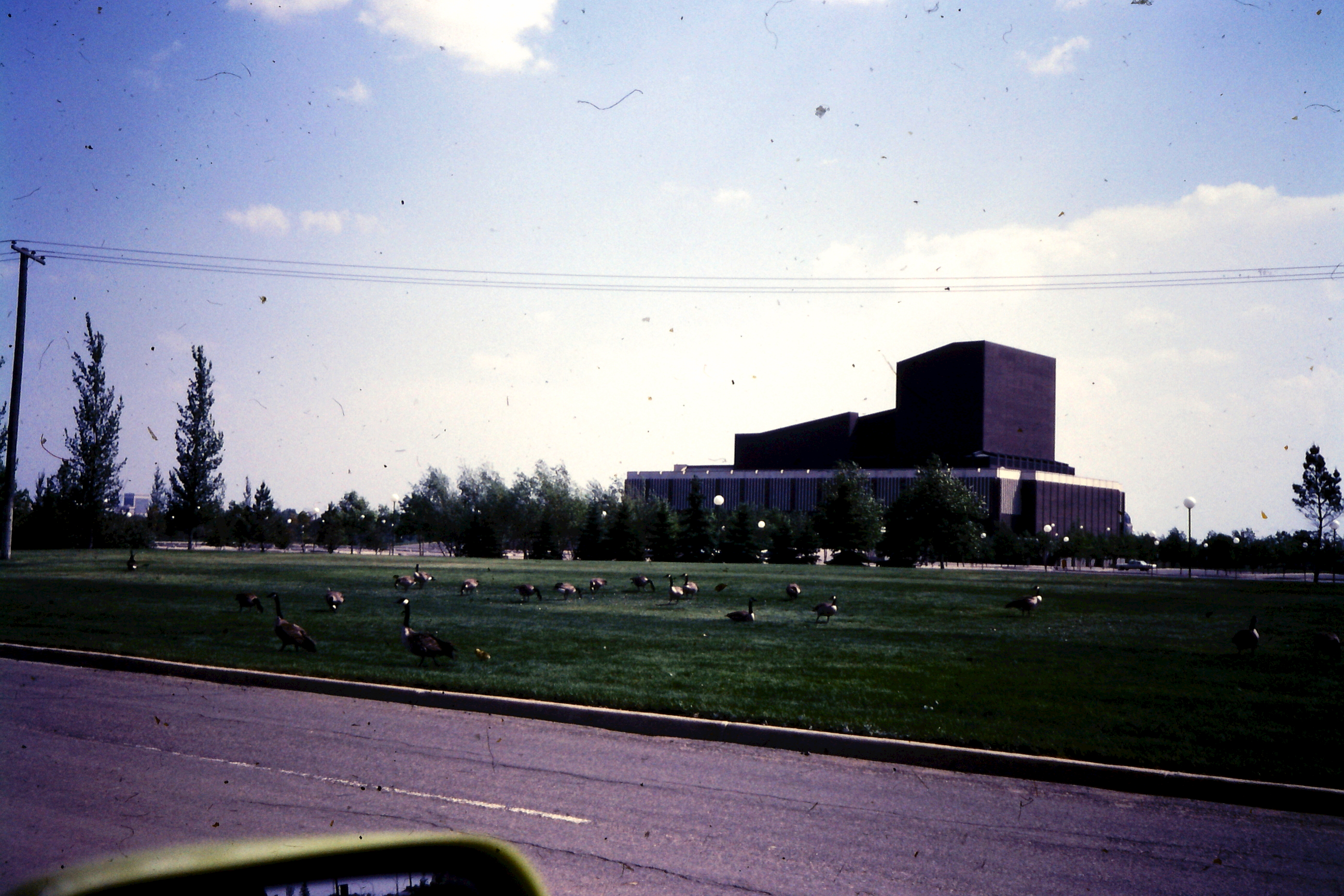
Saskatchewan Centre of the Arts as first appeared

Planned and originally funded to commemorate the Canadian centennial in 1967, its construction was interrupted by a substantial increase in cost and after the steel frame was put up the project did not proceed further for almost two years. A substantial reduction in the nature of many intended building materials permitted the project to resume and after the long delay the Centre of the Arts was opened by Governor General Roland Michener on August 24, 1970 at a cost of $7.7 million to serve southern Saskatchewan as a centre for performing arts and exhibitions as well as university functions including graduation ceremonies of by the adjacent University of Regina.

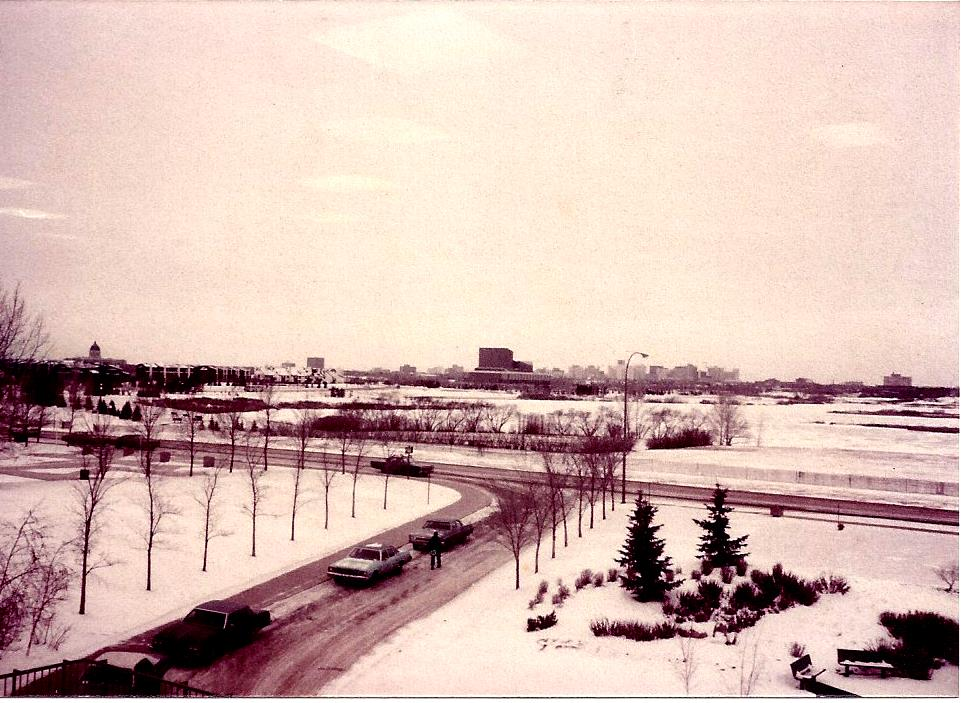
Saskatchewan Centre of the Arts winter 1980-81 from University of Regina Laboratory Building before original plans for exterior could be followed; showing Wascana Centre setting, Legislative Building and downtown Regina beyond

Engineering students at the nearby Regina Campus of the University of Saskatchewan (which became a separate university in 1974) dubbed it the "world's largest monkey bars". It was completed after cutbacks were made to the original plans, including the exterior cladding. Maintenance and renovation in subsequent decades have substantially brought the appearance of the building substantially closer to the original intention than was initially possible. The TCU Place was erected in Saskatoon also commemorating Canada's centennial.

Since 2006, its naming rights have been held by Conexus Credit Union.

== Facilities ==
The building, designed by Izumi, Arnott, and Sugiyama, is an Estevan brick and Manitoba Tyndall stone structure which houses the Main Theatre (seating 2031), Convention Hall (seating 1400, 1000 for banquets), previously known as Doris Knight Hall, Hanbidge Hall and Jubilee Theatre; and various conference rooms and lobby display areas. Main Theatre, with three balconies, has a large stage whose front lowers hydraulically to form an orchestra pit for 100 musicians. The centre is the home of the Regina Symphony Orchestra, which upon its opening immediately transferred its concert site there from Darke Hall at the original Regina College site of the university; it immediately provided a replacement for downtown cinema buildings which were also theatres for stage plays, such as the Regina Theatre (which had burned to the ground in 1939), Regina Grand Theatre (which closed in 1957) and the Capitol Theatre (demolished in 1992). Regina's Globe Theatre performed in the Centre of the Arts from its opening, but in 1981 acquired permanent space on the second and third floors of the old post office (now renamed the Prince Edward Building), the one remaining live theatre facility in downtown Regina. The Centre of the Arts has alternates hosting duties for Telemiracle with TCU Place in Saskatoon.

== Activities in the Centre of the Arts ==
From the time it first opened the Centre of the Arts accommodated world-renowned travelling performers — as diverse as Monty Python's Flying Circus and Van Cliburn among many others in its first years — who might have been thought unlikely to visit a small city far from metropolises. As well as serving as theatre and concert hall for both local and travelling performers and graduation ceremonies of the immediately adjacent University of Regina, it has often been used as a private facility for social functions such as wedding receptions.
