= Colin Maier =

Colin Michael Maier
- Born: January 15, 1976 (age 50); Calgary, Alberta
- Genres: Classical, Classical Crossover, Celtic, Jazz, Klezmer
- Occupations: Musician, Dancer, Acrobat with Quartetto Gelato
- Instruments: Oboe, English horn, clarinet, saxophone, flute, bassoon, violin, 5-string banjo, double bass/electric bass, piano, guitar, mandolin, and musical saw

Colin Maier is a Canadian oboist and multi-instrumentalist and also works as an actor, dancer, and acrobat, often blending these disciplines into one performance. He has also worked as a stuntman and martial artist. He is currently a member of the award-winning Canadian new classical music ensemble Quartetto Gelato, and the oboe and accordion duo JoyRide with pianist Mark Camilleri, formerly Charles Cozens.

== Education ==
Born in Calgary, Alberta, Maier started Suzuki violin at age three and oboe at age 12. In high school, he studied fiddling, singing, dance, acting, martial arts, and gymnastics, and had plans to pursue musical theatre in college. Because of a missed deadline, he ended up pursuing the oboe, and classical music study. Maier graduated from the University of Calgary in 1997 with a bachelor's degree in oboe performance studying with Calgary Philharmonic oboist David Sussman.

== Career ==
Maier began his professional career with a variety of acting engagements, most notably as the devil fiddler in the flying blue canoe for the Vancouver 2010 Winter Olympic Opening Ceremonies. His other acting credits include work in the stage version of The Lord of the Rings (Mirvish), Fire (CanStage), Forbidden Phoenix (LKTYP), KA (Cirque du Soleil), Amadeus (Alberta Theatre Projects), That Dance Show (Saltance Productions), Cats (Neptune Theatre), Joseph's Dreamcoat (StageWest/Drayton), A Chorus Line (StageWest), Sarah Brightman's World Tour, and TV's Honey I Shrunk the Kids! and Murdoch Mysteries.

Maier joined Quartetto Gelato in 2009. This world-touring ensemble is known for their eclectic humorous performances, in which Maier plays the oboe and other instruments, as well as sings, dances, and performs acrobatics.

Maier and Mark Camilleri have a jazz duo, since 2023, called JoyRide. Maier plays jazz oboe and English horn. Camilleri plays piano.

As an oboist, he has performed with The Calgary Philharmonic, The Hamilton Philharmonic, National Ballet of Canada Orchestra, Symphony of the Kootenays, Soundstreams, Windsor Symphony, Toronto Concert Orchestra, Scarborough Philharmonic, Niagara International Chamber Music Festival, The Jive Mommas, The High Strung, The Fabulous Doo-Wop Boy and The Plaid Tongued Devils. In the 2002 International Double Reed Society conference, he performed in, and conducted, a jazz master class with jazz bassoonist Michael Rabinowitz.

In addition to oboe, Maier also plays professionally a variety of instruments including the English horn, clarinet, saxophone, flute, bassoon, violin, 5-string banjo, banyan, acoustic/electric bass, piano, guitar, mandolin and musical saw. He has played a variety of instruments in the following broadway tours through Mirvish Productions: The King and I, Joseph and the Amazing Technicolor Dreamcoat, Les Miserables, and Sound of Music.

His two solo recordings feature newly commissioned compositions by Canadian composers Rebecca Pellet, Hilario Durán, Mark Camilleri, Vincent Ho, and Aura Pon in a variety of genres from classical to jazz and Celtic. Also performances by Canadian musicians, and Canadian comedian Colin Mochrie. Several of the compositions feature Maier playing as many as 13 different instruments.

Maier was the oboe instructor at Brock University from 2015–2018.

Since 2021, Maier is the Production Manager for The Music Niagara Festival, in Niagara-on-the-Lake.

== Discography ==
- 2026 "Flight"
- 2021 "JoyRide" with funding from Factor
- 2021 "Quartetto Gelato - Tasty Tunes" with funding from Factor
- 2015 "Quartetto Gelato - All Original, 100% Canadian" with funding from Factor
- 2014 "The Fabulist – Oboe and Other Things" (solo) with funding from Factor
- 2012 "Advice From a Misguided Man" (solo) with funding from the Ontario Arts Council and Factor
- 2010 "The Magic of Christmas-Quartetto Gelato"
