= Alfred Mirovitch =

Russian-American classical pianist (1884–1959)

Alfred Mirovitch (May 4, 1884 – August 3, 1959) was a Russian-American classical pianist.

== Early life ==
Born in Saint Petersburg, Russia, Mirovitch was a cousin of the Russian pianist Ossip Gabrilowitsch. Mirovitch graduated from the St. Petersburg Imperial Conservatory in 1909, having studied with Anna Yesipova for seven years. While studying at the Conservatory, Mirovitch was awarded the Rubinstein Prize and was the Gold Medallist of his class.

== Career ==
Early in his career, he appeared throughout Europe, performing in Spain, Italy, Germany and Scandinavia. During this period, he performed frequently with violinist Mishel Piastro, touring with the violinist in the Far East and Australia.

Mirovitch made his New York recital debut on October 20, 1920. The program included the Bach-d'Albert Prelude and Fugue in D major, Chopin's Piano Sonata No. 2, Mirovitch's arrangement of a sonata by Étienne Nicolas Méhul and the Liszt Hungarian Rhapsody No. 6. The anonymous critic for the Times Union wrote, "Mr. Mirovitch will be heard again with much interest. His technical equipment is of the best. He almost makes an audience forget that the piano is a percussion instrument—and that is saying much. There is always the feeling among his hearers that he holds plenty of reserve power to be drawn upon, though last evening there were occasions when a little more fire and sparkle was vainly looked for."

Mirovitch made his U.S. concerto debut at Carnegie Hall with the National Symphony Orchestra conducted by Willem Mengelberg on February 24, 1921, playing the Grieg Piano Concerto. At this performance, Mirovitch played "an especially edited cadenze [sic]". The anonymous critic for the New York Times wrote of the Grieg performance that Mirovitch was a pianist of "substantial merit".

At the time of his arrival in the United States, Mirovitch appeared as a Chickering Artist in advertisements for Chickering Pianos alongside pianists such as Ernst von Dohnányi and Germaine Schnitzer.

Mirovitch recorded piano rolls for Ampico, and later, flat-disc recordings for Royale. In 1940, he released the premiere recording of the original piano version of Modest Mussorgsky's Pictures at an Exhibition.

== Teaching and pedagogical materials ==
Mirovitch began his teaching career in the 1920s, giving hundreds of masterclasses and lectures in the United States. In addition to lectures on piano, in his presentations, Mirovitch explored "social and political aspects of world situations" based on his "firsthand experiences".

The pianist taught at the Juilliard School from 1945 until 1953. He planned to join the faculty of Boston University in the fall of 1959, but he died in Whitefield, New Hampshire on August 3.

Mirovitch published roughly fifty pedagogical texts. These texts often collected the work of classical composers, focusing on specific skills such as "Tone Colors", "Command of the Keyboard" and "Keyboard Rhythm".

== Solo discography ==
- Albeniz: Malagueña / Seguidillas (Royale 1841; 1939)
- Borodin: Au couvent (Royale 1853; 1940)
- Debussy: The Girl with the Flaxen Hair / Minstrels (Royale 1820; 1939)
- Liszt: Die Lorelei (Royale 1837; 1940)
- Méhul: Sonata in A major, mvts. II-III (Royale 1828; 1940)
- Mirovitch: Spring Song / Minuet (Royale 1824; 1939)
- Mozart: Variations on "Com'e un Agnello" (Royale 584/585; 1940)
- Mussorgsky: Pictures at an Exhibition (Royale Album No. 25; 1940)
