= Alberta Musical Theatre Company =

Alberta Musical Theatre Company, based in Edmonton, Alberta, Canada, is the major touring Theatre for Young Audiences company in Alberta. It has been presenting original musical theatre adaptations in schools in British Columbia, Saskatchewan and Alberta since 1984 and its repertoire includes such fairytales as Rapunzel, Puss in Boots, Cinderella, Sleeping Beauty, Rumplestiltskin, The Frog Prince, The Red Shoes, and the Elizabeth Sterling Haynes Award-winning Jack and the Beanstalk. Besides exploring traditional themes with contemporary eyes, Alberta Musical Theatre Company offers 16 students the chance to actively participate in each production as actors and stagehands.

== History ==
In 2006, Farren Timoteo was named the company's artistic director.

The company moved to its current office in the Stanley A. Milner Library (Downtown) branch of the Edmonton Public Library in 2008, and it has established itself as one of the educational production companies in Canada, presenting performances to over one million people since its inception.

The 2008/2009 season consists of an Alberta tour of the world premiere of Little Red Riding Hood, as well as a British Columbia tour of The Frog Prince. Alberta Musical Theatre Company performed for 130,000 children in the 08/09 Season, with 441 performances. "Little Red Riding Hood" received the Elizabeth Sterling Haynes Award for Outstanding Production for Theatre for Young Audiences in 2009. This production was held over into the fall of 2009, touring both Alberta and British Columbia.

== Awards and nominations ==
| Year | Award | Category | Piece | Person | Result | Ref |
|---|---|---|---|---|---|---|
| 2019 | Elizabeth Sterling Haynes Awards | Outstanding Production for Young Audiences | Pinochio | | | |
| 2019 | Elizabeth Sterling Haynes Awards | Outstanding Artistic Achievement, Theatre for Young Audiences | Pinochio | Farren Timoteo | | |
| 2019 | Elizabeth Sterling Haynes Awards | Outstanding Artistic Achievement, Theatre for Young Audiences | Pinochio | Chariz Faulmino | | |
| 2020 | Elizabeth Sterling Haynes Awards | Outstanding Production for Young Audiences | Sleeping Beauty | | Nominated | |
| 2020 | Elizabeth Sterling Haynes Awards | Outstanding Artistic Achievement for Young Audiences | Sleeping Beauty | Deanna Finnman | Nominated | |
