= Conexus Credit Union =

Credit union based in Regina, Saskatchewan, Canada

- Type: Credit Union
- Industry: Financial services
- Headquarters: Regina, Saskatchewan, Canada
- Key people: Celina Philpot, Executive Officer
- Total assets: $10.35 billion in total funds managed CAD (2024)
- Number of employees: 800
- Website: www.conexus.ca

Conexus Credit Union is a Regina, Saskatchewan credit union operating in Saskatchewan

Saskatchewan's largest credit union, it has over $10 billion in consolidated assets, more than 140,000 members, and 30 branches across the province. More than 800 employees and sales professionals are located throughout the province.

== History ==
In 1937, Tom Molloy, a reporter turned labour leader organized and created the Regina Co-operative Savings and Credit Union, which later came to be named Sherwood Credit Union. Sherwood Credit Union (later Conexus Credit Union) in 1976 implemented the first automated teller machine in Canada at its two branches in Regina. The project was developed for Sherwood Credit Union by the IT staff of CIS (Co-operative Insurance Services - later CGI) under contract to Saskatchewan Cooperative Credit Services (later Saskcentral). This venture involved cooperation from IBM Canada.

In April 2025, Conexus, Yorkton-based Cornerstone Credit Union, and Lloydminster-based Synergy Credit Union, announced their intent to merge, pending member and regulatory approval. The merger was approved in June 2025, and officially took effect January 1, 2026; the merged entity will inherit the Conexus Credit Union name and will be led by its current CEO Celina Philpot.
