= Quartetto Gelato =

Canadian classical crossover quartet

- Origin: Hamilton, Ontario, Canada
- Genre: New Classical
- Years active: 1989–present
- Label: Linus Universal
- Members: Colin Maier; Matti Pulkki; Dobrochna Zubek; Konstantin (Tino) Popovic
- Website: quartettogelato.ca

Quartetto Gelato is a Canadian classical crossover quartet with current members Colin Maier, Matti Pulkki, Dobrochna Zubek, and Tino Popovic, and based in Hamilton, Ontario. Their musical repertoire consists of a mix of classical masterworks with tangos, gypsy, klezmer, jazz, and folk songs from around the world. They usually play without musical scores and their performances include elements of humour and dance.

== History ==
Quartetto Gelato was originally formed in 1989 in Toronto and the founding members were Cynthia Steljes, her husband Peter de Sotto, George Meanwell, and Claudio Vena. They began performing as part of the emerging "new classical" scene, and in 1996 the group was named NPR Performance Today's Debut Artist of the Year.

Canadian astronaut Dr. Robert Thirsk took their first two CDs with him during his NASA flight on board the space shuttle Columbia in 1997. By 2007, the ensemble had recorded six albums of music and had sold 150,000 CDs.

Quartetto Gelato has changed members over the years. Cynthia Steljes left the group because of ill health and died in 2006. Oboist, singer, and multi-instrumentalist Colin Maier joined in 2009. Cellist Liza McLellan joined at about that same time and then left in 2018. Accordionist Alexander Sevastian, who had joined the ensemble in 2004, died suddenly on Friday, February 16, 2018, while on tour with the ensemble in Ajijic, Mexico. Cellist Kirk Starkey joined in May 2018. The group was joined by violinist Tino Konstantin Popovic when founding member Peter de Sotto retired in the fall of 2019. Accordionist Matti Pulkki joined in 2020 and cellist Dobrochna Zubek replaced Kirk Starkey in 2025.

Quartetto Gelato performs throughout Canada and internationally, in recital, as soloists with orchestra, and as guests at classical and crossover concerts.

== Awards and nominations ==
In 1995, Quartetto Gelato was nominated for a Juno Award as Instrumental Artist(s) of the Year; their album Quartetto Gelato was nominated for "Best Classical Album by a Solo or Chamber Ensemble". In 1996 the group was named "Debut Artist of the Year" by NPR Performance Today. In 1999, Quartetto Gelato's La Danza was received two nominations at the Gemini Awards: "Best Photography in a Comedy, Variety, Performing Arts Program or Series", and "Best Editing in a Comedy, Variety, Performing Arts Program or Series".

In 2005, the show Canada Day 2004: Merci Montréal, in which the group participated, was nominated for "Best Performance or Host in a Variety Program or Series'" at the Gemini Awards. Also in 2010, Quartetto Gelato was named "Best Classical Group" at the Independent Music Awards during Canadian Music Week.

== Current members ==
- Colin Maier — oboe, voice, musical saw, English horn, clarinet, guitar, mandolin
- Matti Pulkki — accordion
- Dobrochna Zubek — cello
- Konstantin (Tino) Popovic — violin, voice

== Former musicians ==
- Peter de Sotto — violin and tenor. Founder of QG
- Cynthia Steljes (deceased) — oboe, English horn
- George Meanwell — guitar, cello, mandolin
- Claudio Vena — accordion, viola
- Kristina Reiko Cooper — cello
- Elinor Frey — cello
- Carina Reeves — cello
- Liza McLellan — cello and bass
- Lydia Munchinsky — cello
- Greg Gallagher — cello
- Kirk Starkey — cello
- Joseph Macerollo — accordion
- Alexander Sevastian (deceased) — accordion, piano
- Charles Cozens — accordion
- Shalom Bard — clarinet
- Kornel Wolak — clarinet

== Discography ==
=== Albums ===
External audio
- You may hear the album "Neapolitan Cafe" by Quartetto Gelato with the accordionist Joseph Macerollo in 2001; Here on Archive.org

- Quartetto Gelato (1993)
- Rustic Chivalry (1996)
- Aria Fresca (1998)
- Neapolitan Café (2001)
- Quartetto Gelato Travels the Orient Express (2004)
- Musica Latina (2009)
- The Magic of Christmas (2010)
- All Original - 100% Canadian (2015)
- Tasty Tunes (2021)
- Flight (2026)

=== Commissions of new works ===
Quartetto Gelato has commissioned works from Canadian composers including Rebecca Pellett, Howard Cable, Michael Occhipinti, Hilario Durán, Charles Cozens, and Jossy Abramovich.

=== Compilations ===
- Favourite Flavours (2005)

=== Guest appearances ===
- Only You: Music From The Motion Picture (1994)
- Ashley MacIsaac, Hi, How Are You Today? (1995)

== Videography ==
- Quartetto Gelato - La Danza (Music Video) (1998)
- CBC's Canada Day 2004: Merci Montreal! (2004)
- Quartetto Gelato Explores Music and Wine DVD (2006)
- Romanian Caravan (2010)
- Border Crossing (2012)
- Liza's Dream (2016)
