= Regina Symphony Orchestra =

- Short name: RSO
- Former name: Regina Orchestral Society, Regina Choral and Orchestral Society, Regina Philharmonic Association
- Founded: 1908
- Principal conductor: Gordon Gerrard
- Website: reginasymphony.com

The Regina Symphony Orchestra (RSO) is a Canadian professional orchestra founded by Frank Laubach, in Regina, Saskatchewan, as the Regina Orchestral Society in 1908, giving its inaugural concert December 3 of that same year. Becoming the Regina Choral and Orchestral Society in 1919, and merging briefly with the Regina Male Voice Choir as the Regina Philharmonic Association in 1924, it returned to independent status as the Regina Symphony in 1926, presenting its first regular season (1927–1928) under W. Knight Wilson.

For many years the orchestra consisted of 50 players, it grew to 70 in the 1960s. From 1929, its home was Darke Hall on College Avenue until it moved to the Saskatchewan Centre of the Arts in 1970.

The orchestra performs over 30 concerts every season to over 30,000 people over a 37-week season.

King Charles III, as Prince of Wales, granted his patronage to the orchestra in September 2008, making the RSO the fourth orchestra in the world to be granted this honour by the heir to the Canadian throne. In 2023, members of the orchestra were selected to play at his coronation.

The orchestra has also performed with the South Saskatchewan Youth Orchestra (begun in 1977 under the RSO's sponsorship), the Royal Winnipeg Ballet, the National Ballet, the Regina Symphony Philharmonic Chorus (established in 1973) and Alberta Opera. The orchestra has also been broadcast regularly by CBC Radio.

== Conductors ==
Regina Symphony conductors have been:

- Frank Laubach 1908–1922
- W(illiam) Knight Wilson 1923–1941 and 1945–1955
- Arthur Collingwood 1941–1942 (Conservatory)
- John Thornicroft 1942–1945 (Conservatory), 1955–1958
- Paul McIntyre 1959–1960
- Howard Leyton-Brown 1960–1971
- Boris Brott 1971–1973
- Ted Kardash 1973–1974
- Timothy Vernon 1975–1976
- Guest conductors 1976–1978
- Gregory Millar 1978–1981
- Simon Streatfeild 1981–1984
- Derrick Inouye 1984–1989
- Vladimir Conta 1989–1997
- Victor Sawa 1997–2016
- Gordon Gerrard 2016–present

== Concertmasters ==
Concertmasters have been:

- Marion B. Kinnee 1926–1932, 1933–1935
- Jean Eilers 1932–1933, 1935–1936
- John Thornicroft 1936–1955
- Lloyd Blackman 1955–1959 and 1960–1975
- Elizabeth Boychuk 1959–1960
- Malcolm Lowe 1975–1977
- Brian Boychuk 1974–1975 (acting/assistant) 1977–1978
- Howard Leyton-Brown 1978–1989
- Brian Johnson 1989–1990
- Guests 1990–1991
- Carmen Constantinescu 1991–1992
- Noel Laporte 1992–1998
- Moshe Hammer 1998–1999
- Eduard Minevich 1999–2012
- Karen Constant 2012–2014 (acting)
- Simon MacDonald 2014–2017
- Christian Robinson 2017–2018 (acting)
- Christian Robinson 2018–present
