= List of members of the Hockey Hall of Fame =

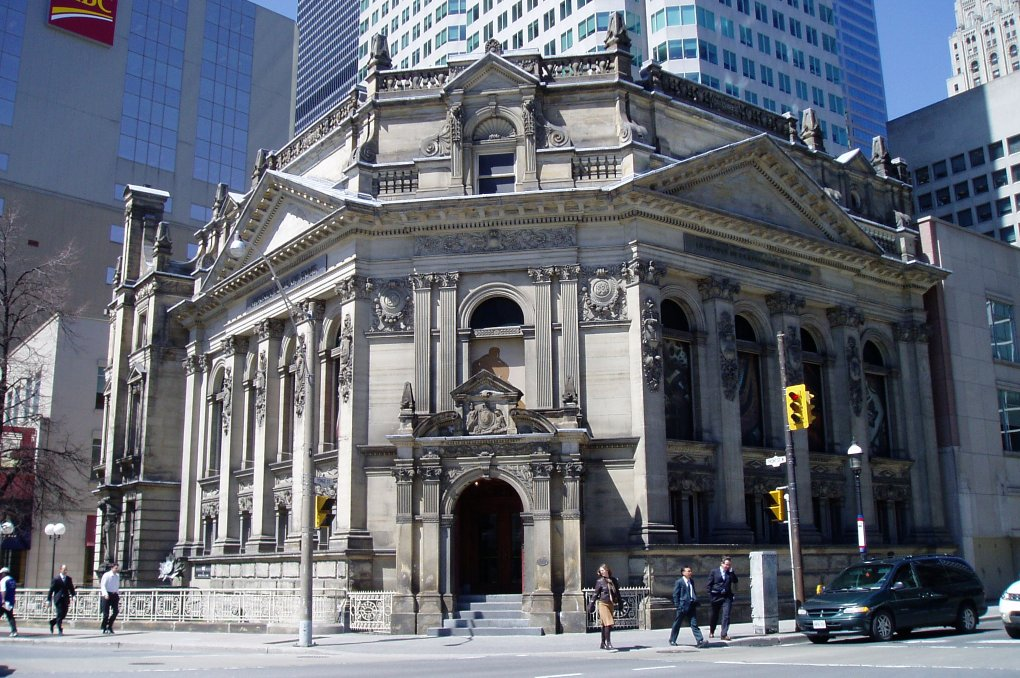
The Hockey Hall of Fame

The Hockey Hall of Fame is a hall of fame and museum dedicated to the history of ice hockey. It was established in 1943 and is located in Toronto, Ontario, Canada. Originally, there were two categories for induction, players and builders, and in 1961, a third category for on-ice officials was introduced. In 2010, a subcategory was established for female players. In 1988, a "veteran player category" was established in order to "provide a vehicle for players who may have been overlooked and whose chances for election would be limited when placed on the same ballot with contemporary players". Eleven players were inducted into the category, but in 2000 the board of directors eliminated it and those inductees are now considered to be in the player category.

Inductees must be nominated by an elected 18-person selection committee which includes Hockey Hall of Fame members and media personalities. Each committee member is allowed to nominate one person in each category per year, and candidates must receive the support of 75% of the members of the committee that are present, or a minimum of ten votes. In any given year, there can be a maximum of four male players, two female players, and a combined two in the builders and on-ice officials categories. For a player, referee, or linesman to be nominated, the person must have been retired for a minimum three years. Builders may be "active or inactive". The induction ceremony is held at the current Hall of Fame building and was first broadcast by The Sports Network in 1994.

The Hockey Hall of Fame also displays "Media honourees", who have been awarded the "Elmer Ferguson Memorial Award", which is awarded by the Professional Hockey Writers' Association to "distinguished members of the newspaper profession whose words have brought honour to journalism and to hockey", or the "Foster Hewitt Memorial Award", which is awarded by the NHL Broadcasters' Association to "members of the radio and television industry who made outstanding contributions to their profession and the game during their career in hockey broadcasting". However, the media honourees are not considered full inductees, and are not included in this list. The winners are announced and honoured at different times than the other honourees. Foster Hewitt is the only media honouree inducted in his own right into the Hall, as a builder.

As of 2026, there are 319 players (including fifteen women), 120 builders and 16 on-ice officials in the Hockey Hall of Fame. 17 honourees have been inducted posthumously.

== Members ==
=== Players ===
The player category has been in existence since the beginning of the Hall of Fame and the first nine players were inducted in 1945. For a person to be inducted to the Hockey Hall of Fame as a player, they must have been retired for a minimum of three years and must be nominated by an elected 18-person selection committee. The waiting period was waived for ten players deemed exceptionally notable: Dit Clapper (1947), Maurice Richard (1961), Ted Lindsay (1966), Red Kelly (1969), Terry Sawchuk (1971), Jean Beliveau (1972), Gordie Howe (1972), Bobby Orr (1979), Mario Lemieux (1997), and Wayne Gretzky (1999). Following Wayne Gretzky's retirement, it was announced that the waiting period would no longer be waived for any player except under "certain humanitarian circumstances".

As of 2012, a maximum of four players can be inducted in one year but the greatest number of players inducted in a year was 23, in 1963. They were inducted because the Hall of Fame was trying to induct many pre-NHL era players. Sometimes noted as 1962 inductees, the pre-NHL era players were named at the 1962 Hall of Fame luncheon at the Canadian National Exhibition (CNE), but were inducted one year later, in 1963 at the CNE. 232 of the player inductees are Canadian-born, while 16 European-born players have been inducted. The NHL team with the most player inductees is the Toronto Maple Leafs (previously the Toronto St. Patricks and Toronto Arenas), with 60. Seventy-seven defencemen are in the Hall of Fame, more than any other current position, while only 36 goaltenders have been inducted.

In 1988, a "veteran player category" was established in order to "provide a vehicle for players who may have been overlooked and whose chances for election would be limited when placed on the same ballot with contemporary players". Eleven players were inducted into the category, but in 2000, the board of directors eliminated it, and now those inductees are considered to be in the player category.

Positions key
C	Centre
LW	Left wing
D	Defence
RW	Right wing
G	Goaltender
R	Rover
F	Forward

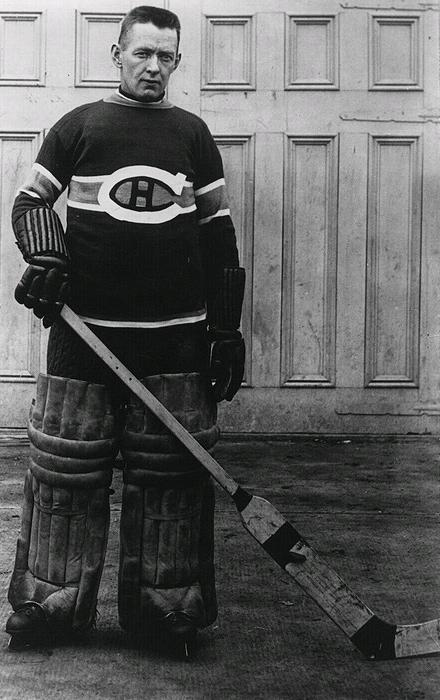
Georges Vezina, inducted in 1945

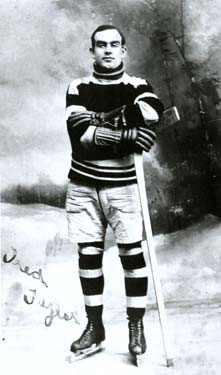
Cyclone Taylor, inducted in 1947

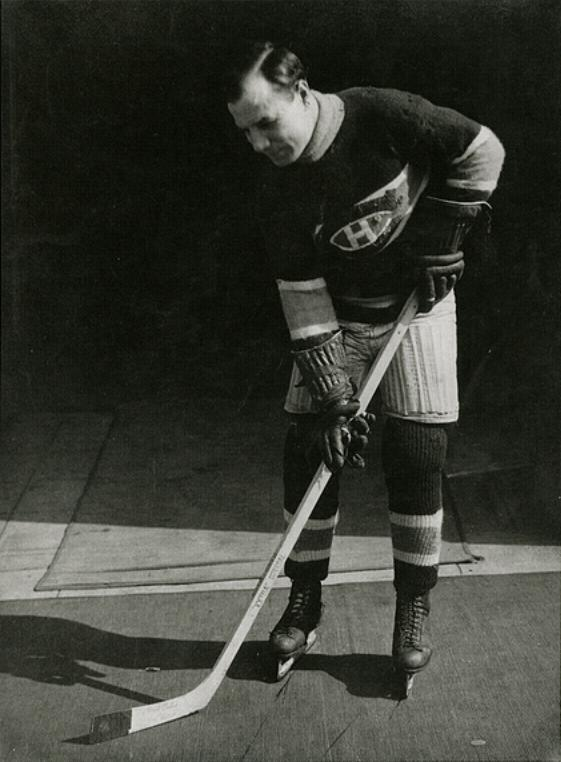
Newsy Lalonde, inducted in 1950

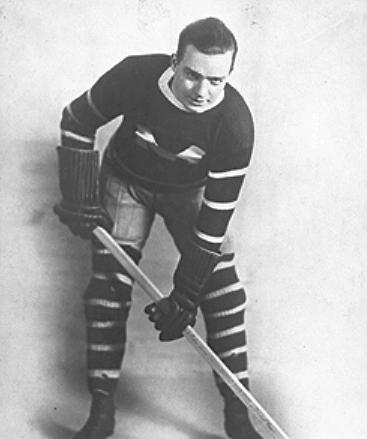
Nels Stewart, inducted in 1952

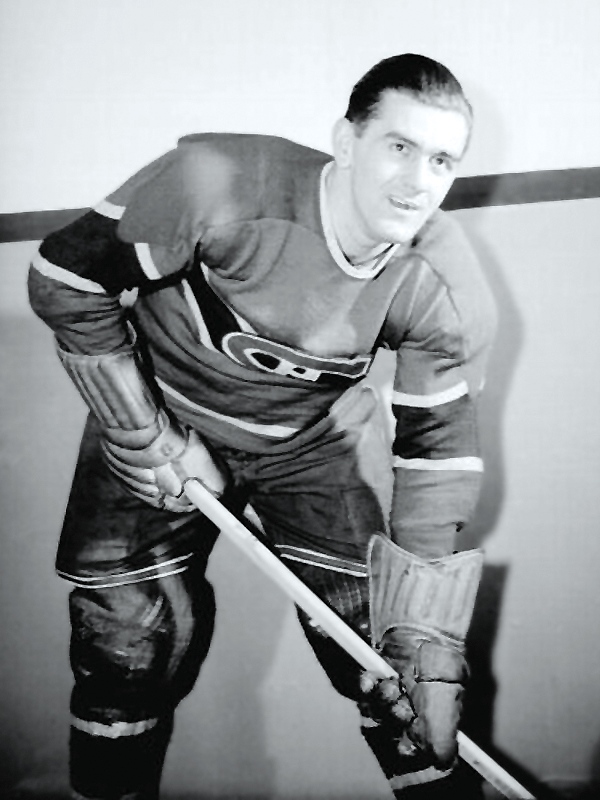
Maurice Richard, inducted in 1961

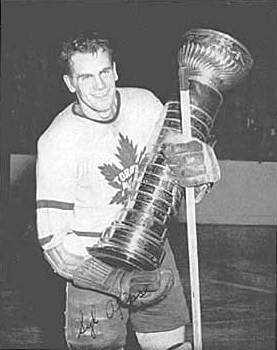
Syl Apps, inducted in 1961

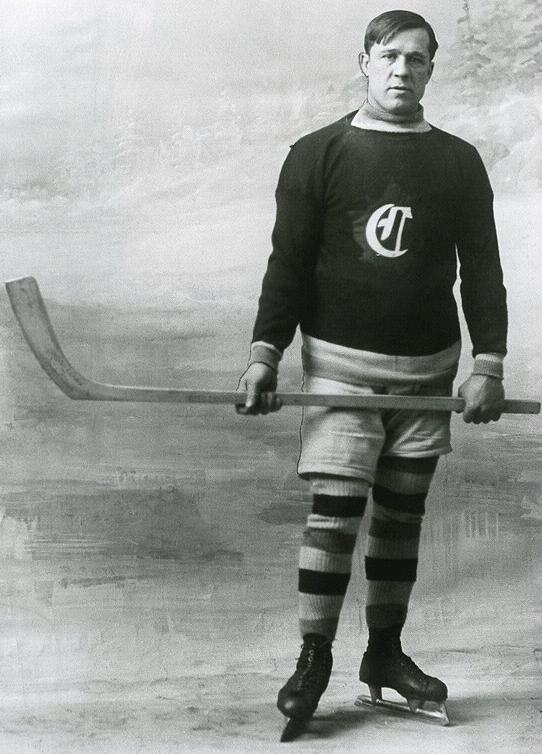
Didier Pitre, inducted in 1963

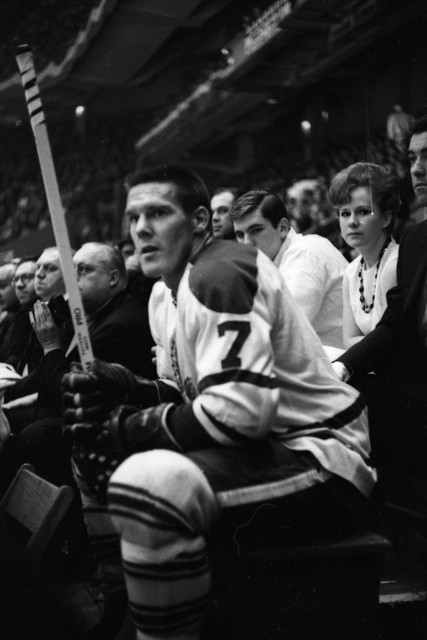
Tim Horton, inducted in 1977

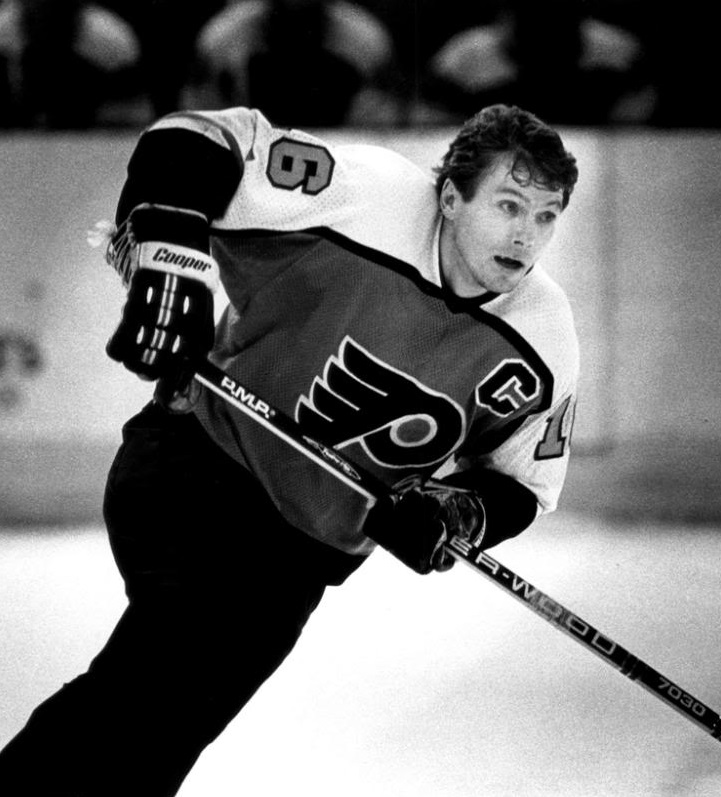
Bobby Clarke, inducted in 1987

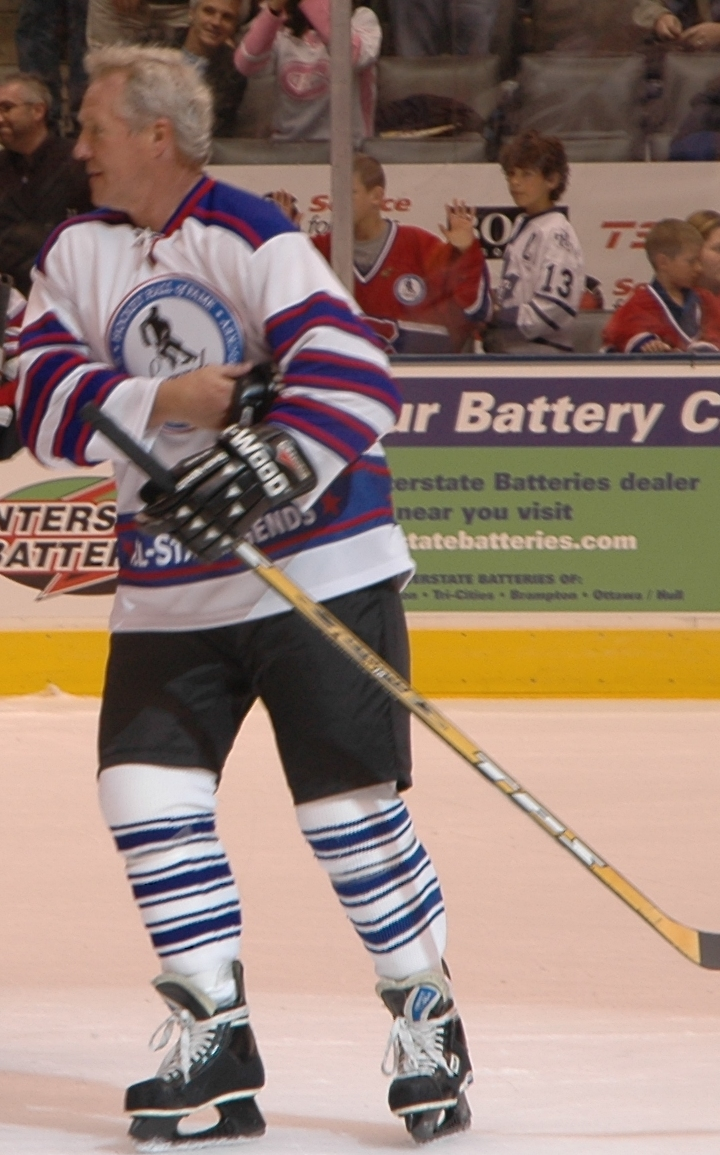
Darryl Sittler, inducted in 1989

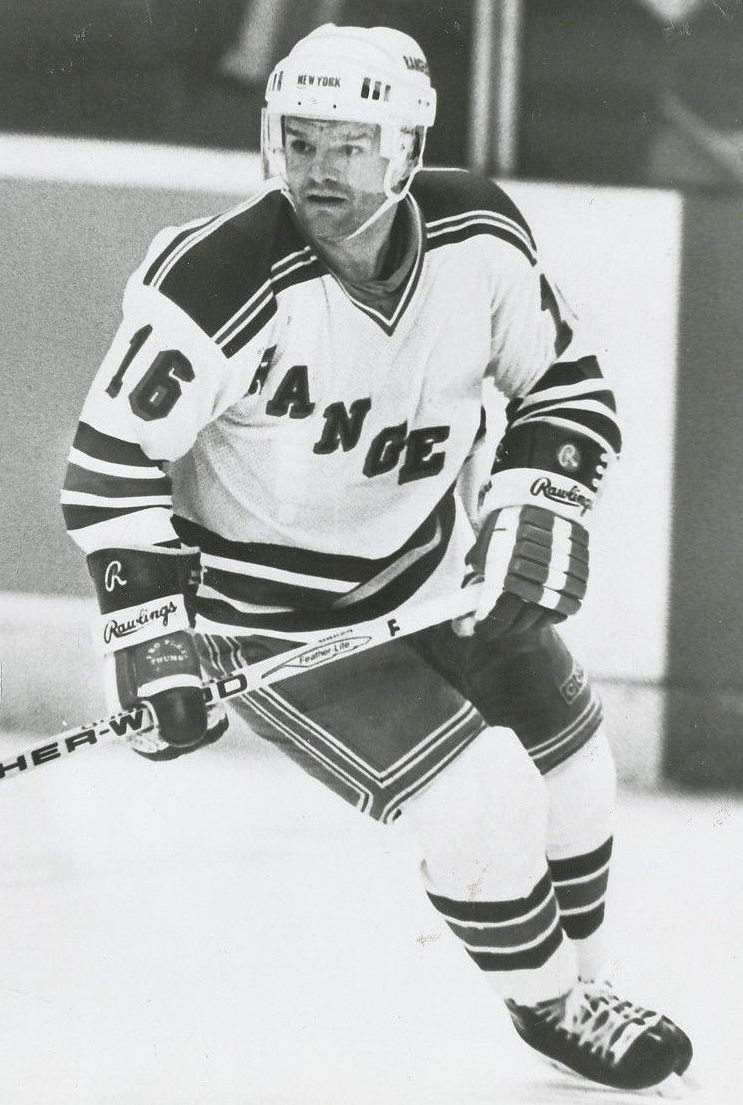
Marcel Dionne, inducted in 1992

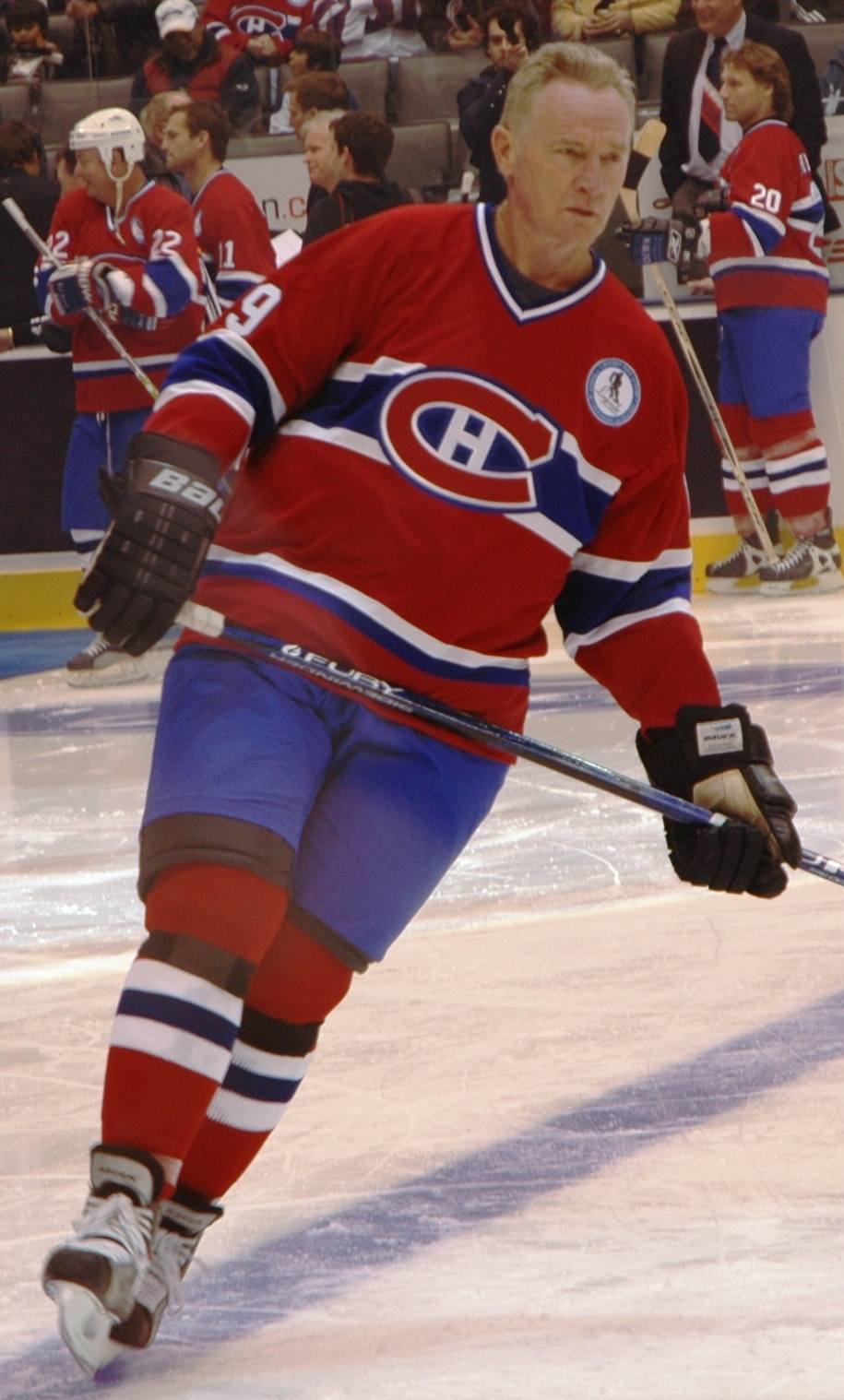
Larry Robinson, inducted in 1995

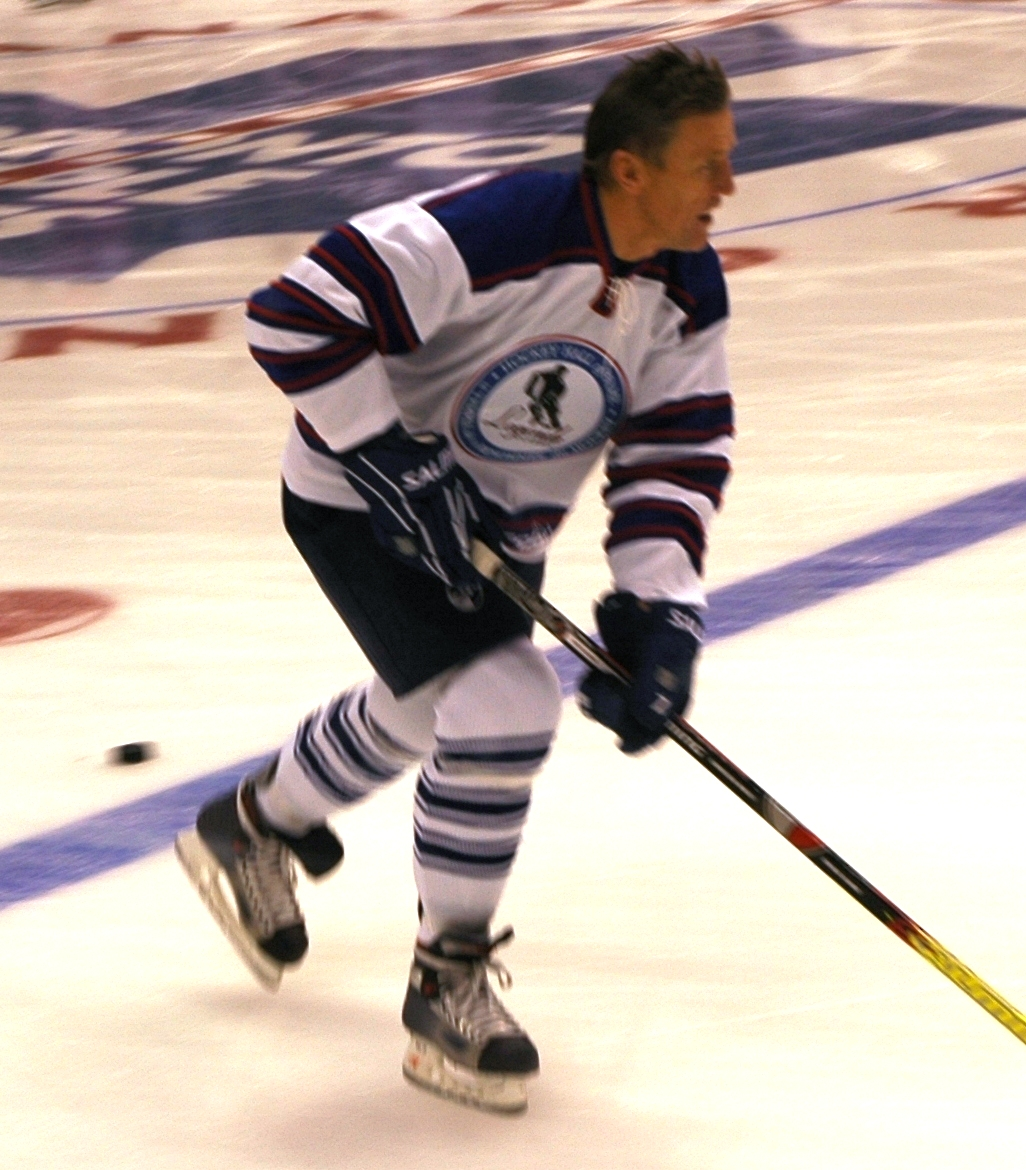
Borje Salming, inducted in 1996

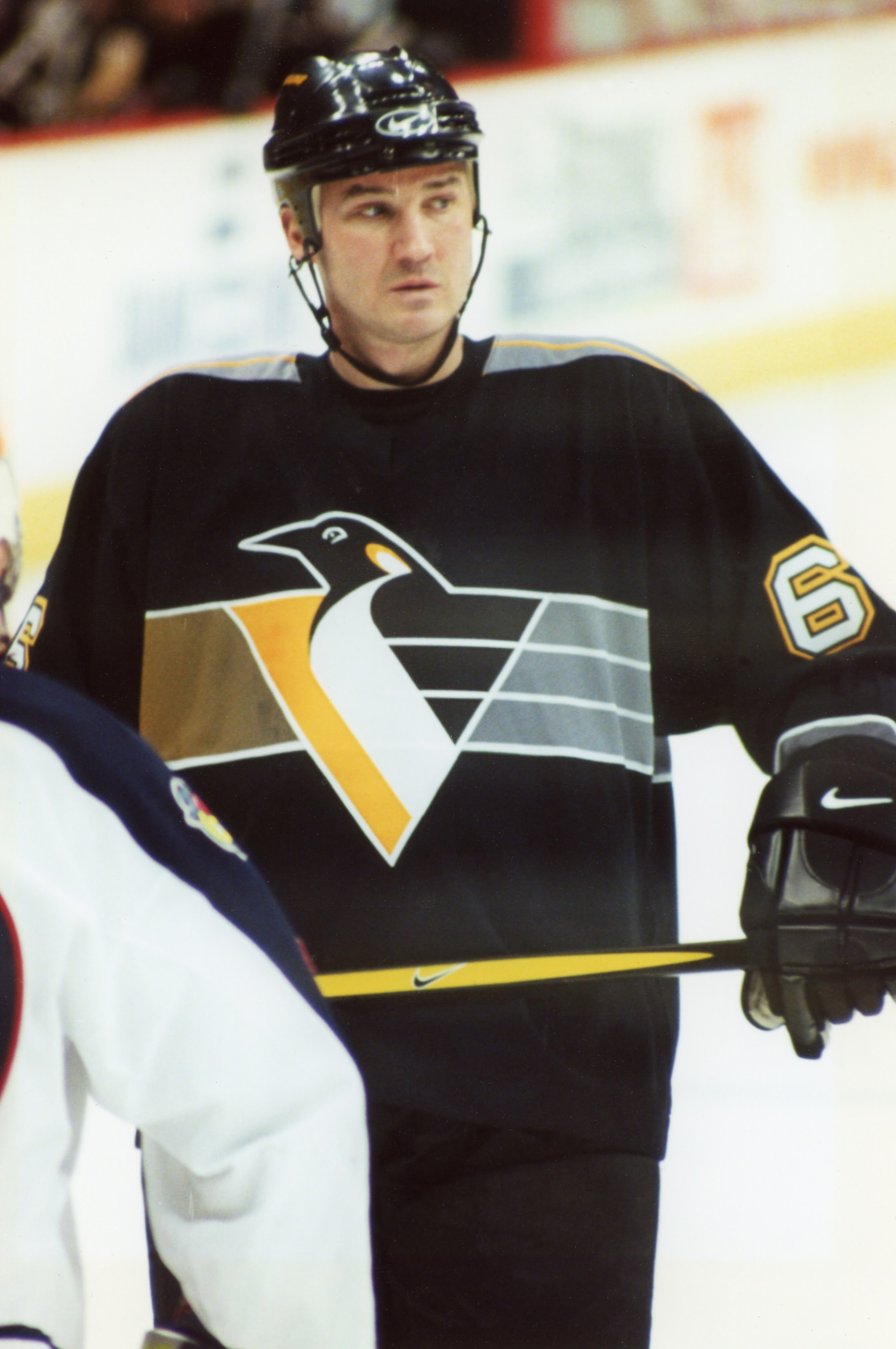
Mario Lemieux, inducted in 1997

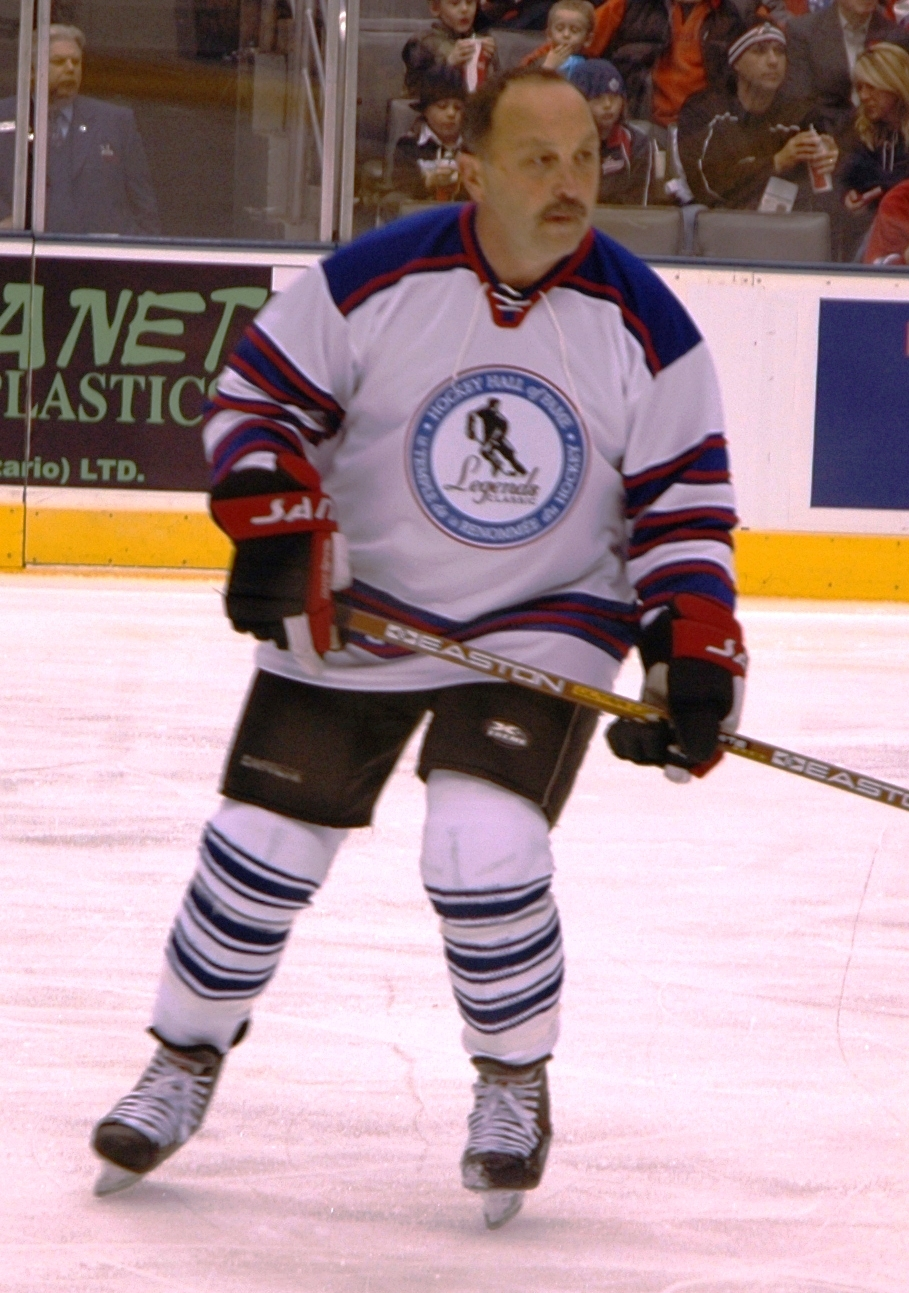
Bryan Trottier, inducted in 1997

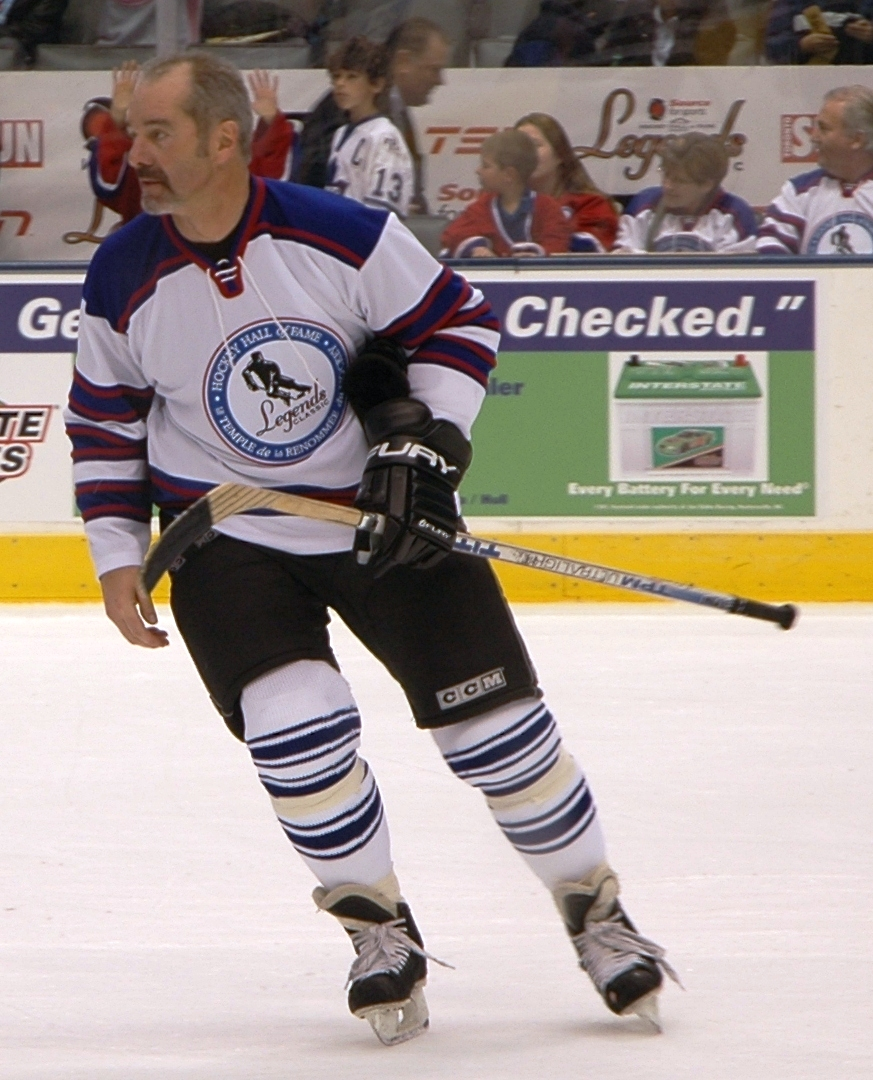
Michel Goulet, inducted in 1998

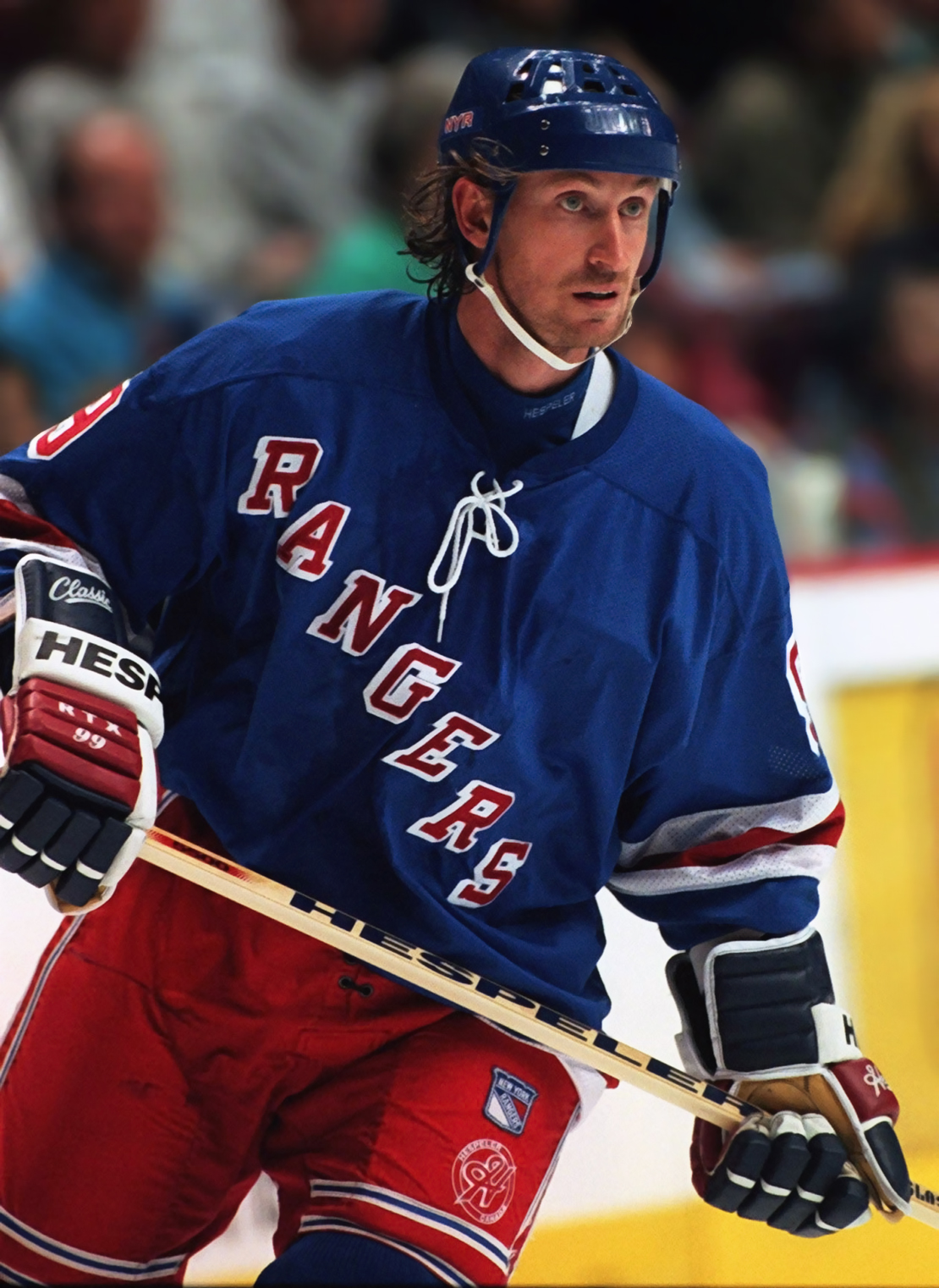
Wayne Gretzky, inducted in 1999

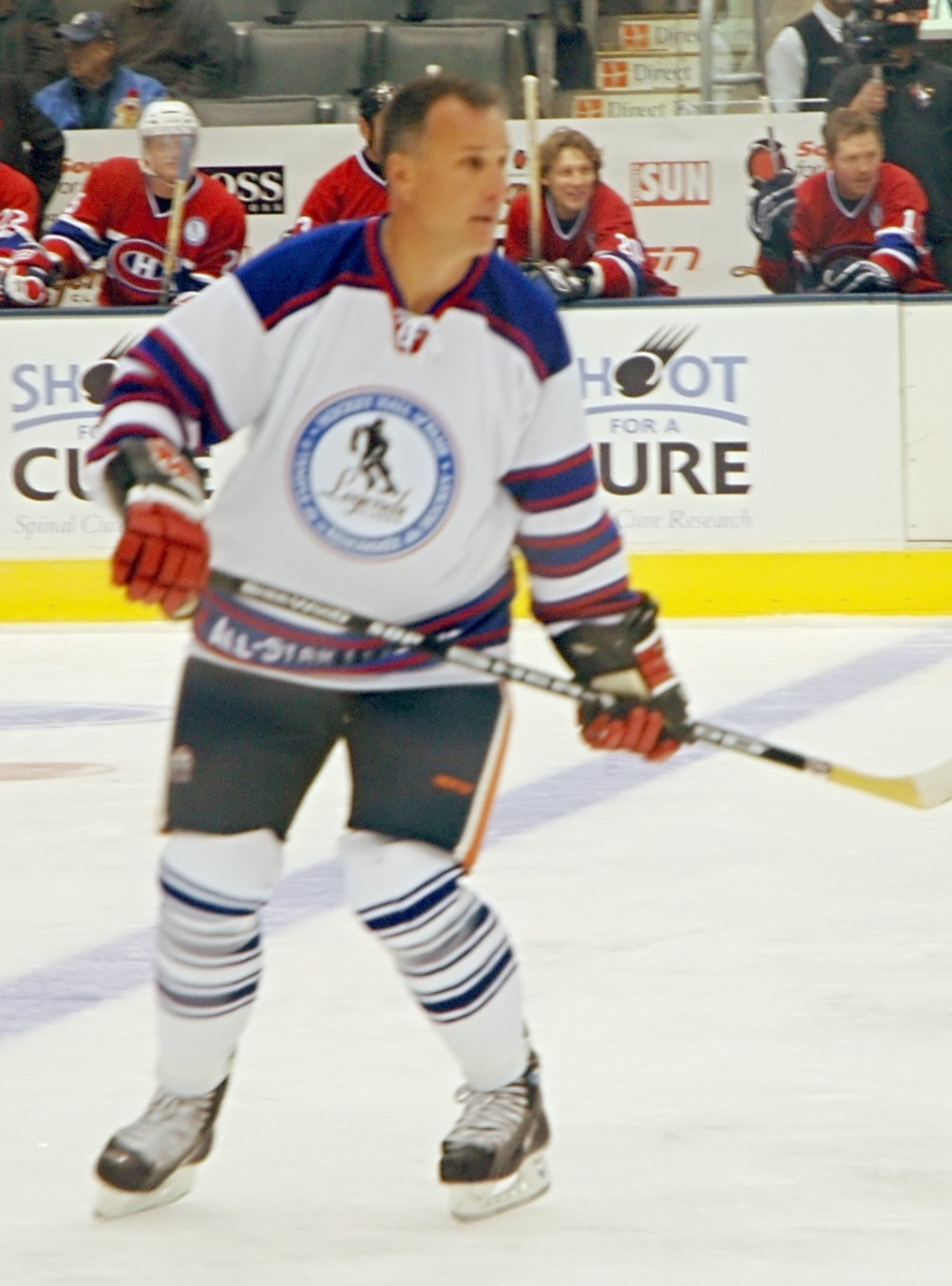
Paul Coffey, inducted in 2004

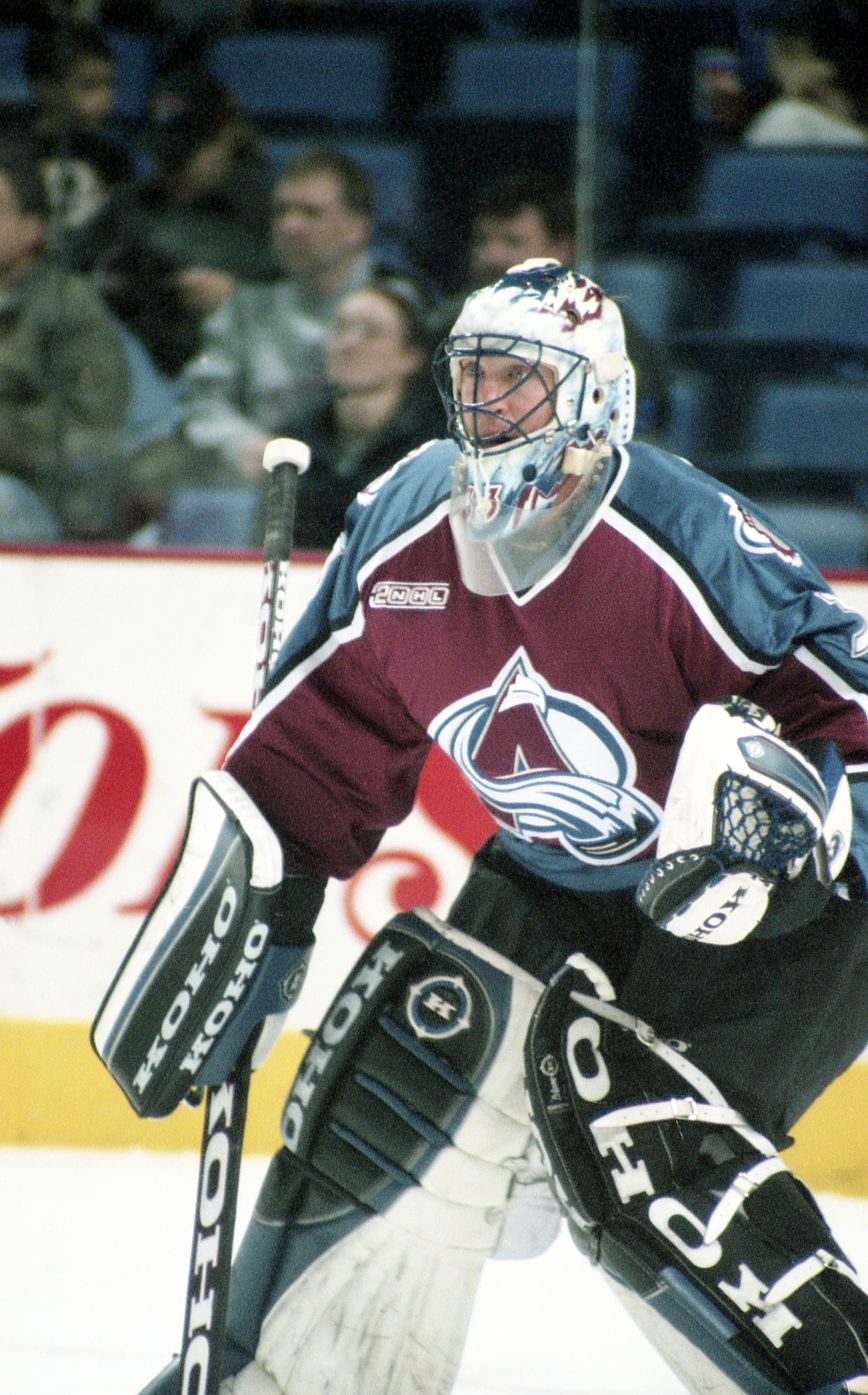
Patrick Roy, inducted in 2006

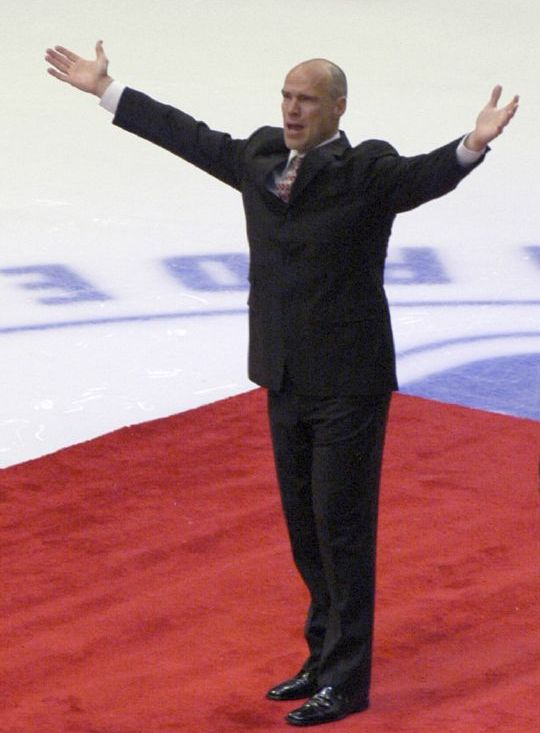
Mark Messier, inducted in 2007

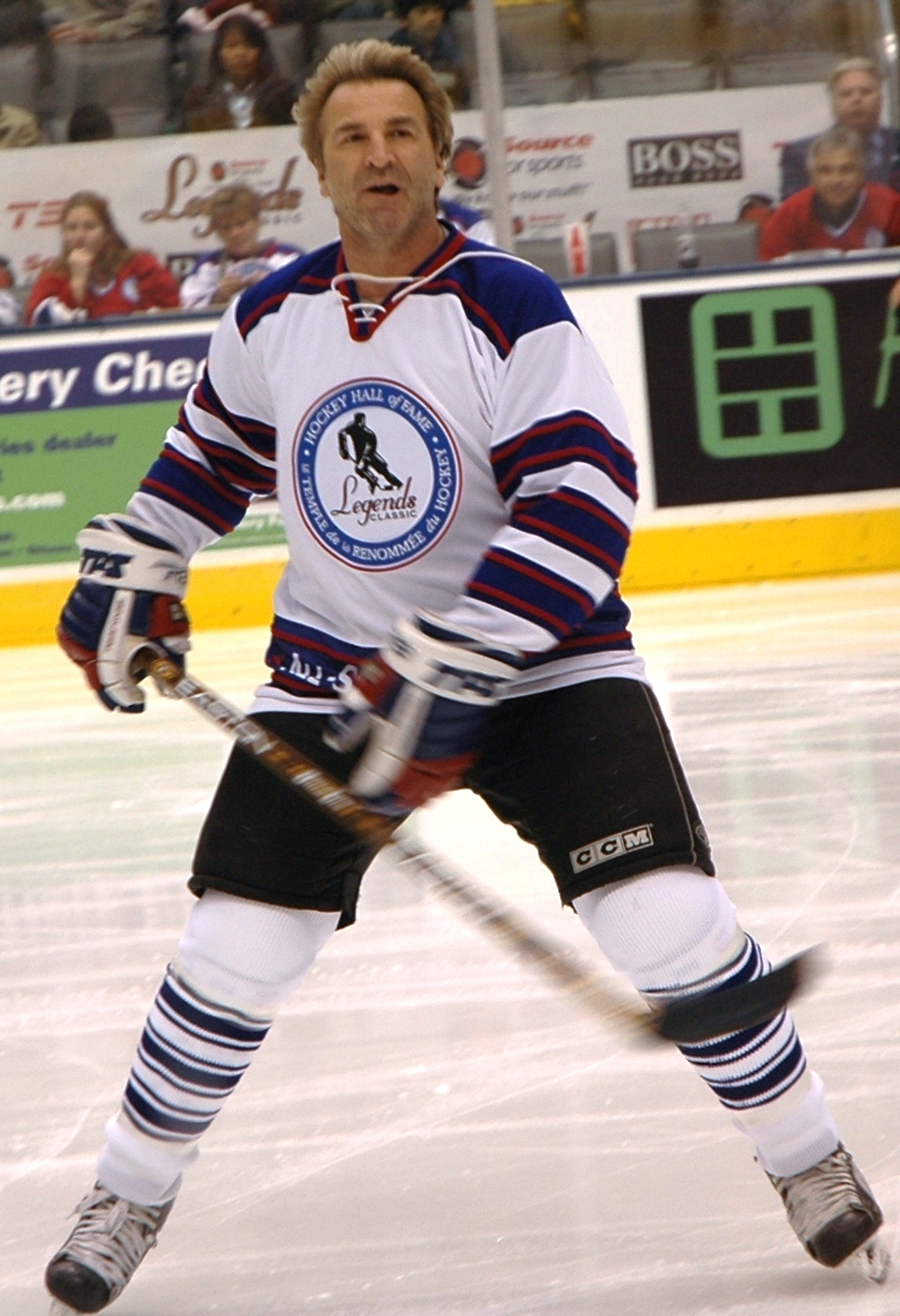
Glenn Anderson, inducted in 2008

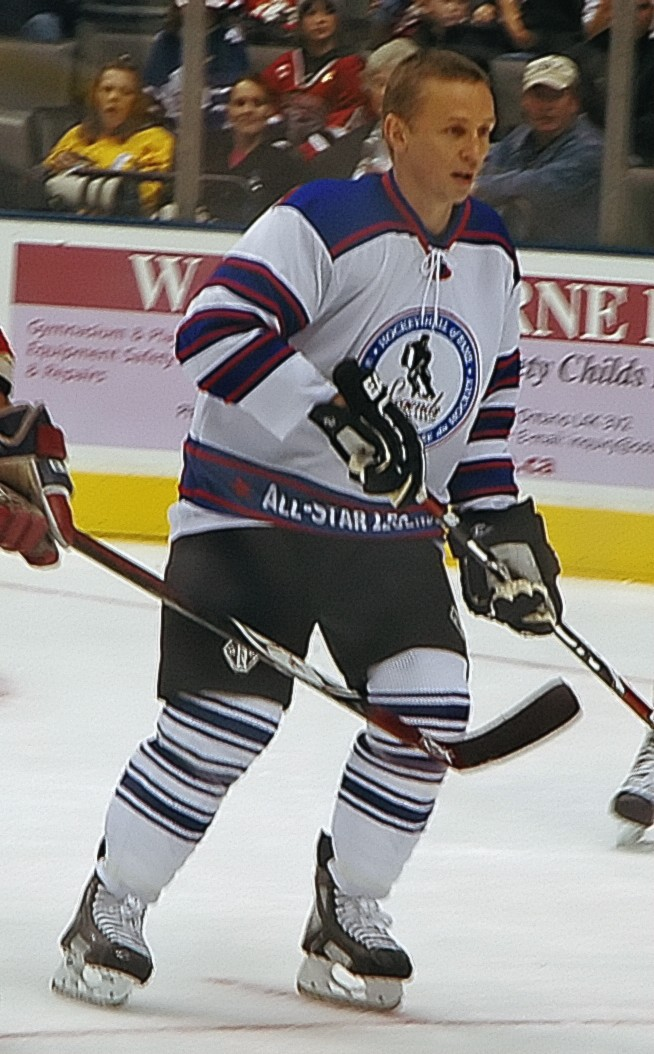
Igor Larionov, inducted in 2008

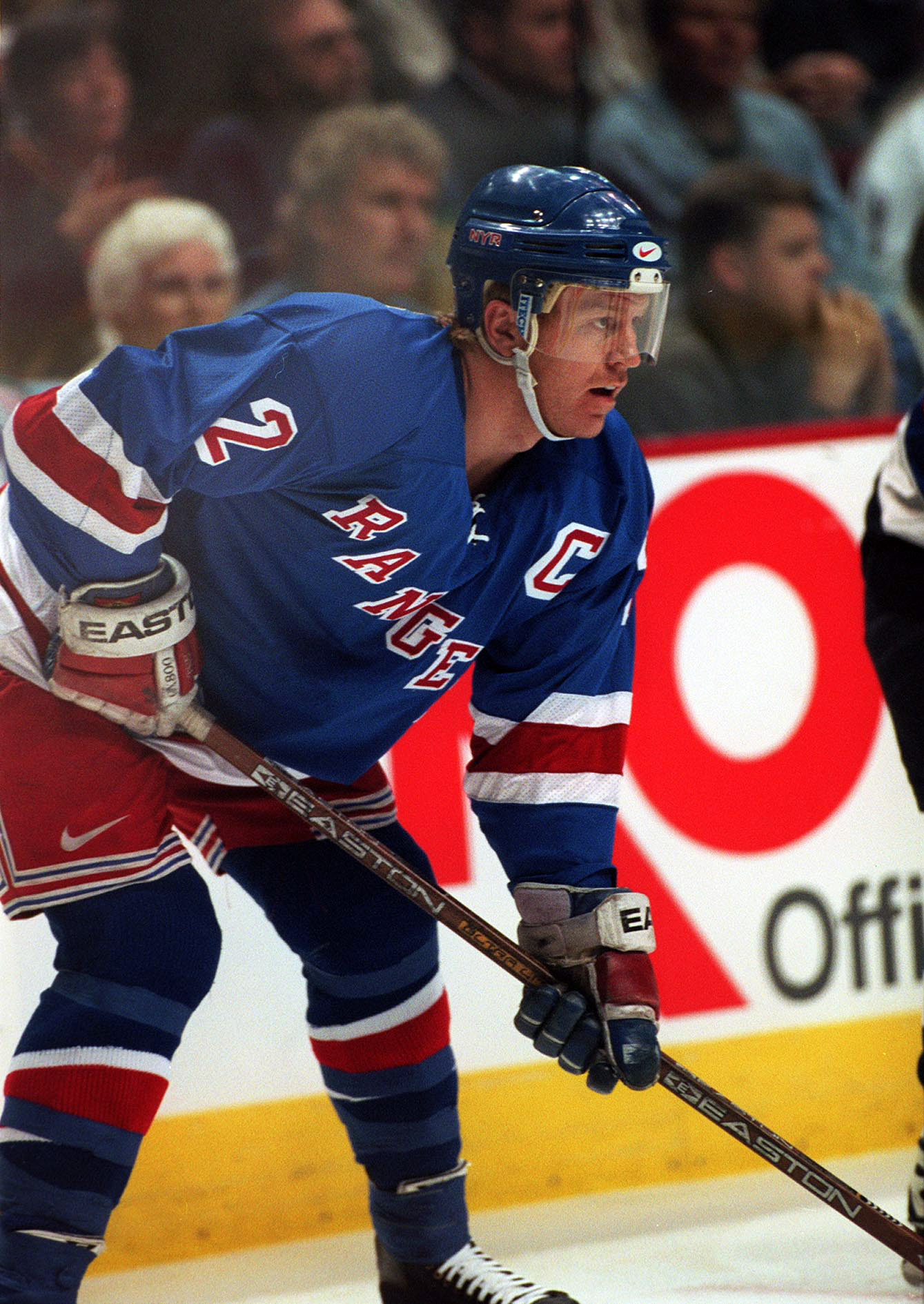
Brian Leetch, inducted in 2009

Year	Name	Position	Nationality
1945	Hobey Baker	F	United States
1945	Charlie Gardiner	G	Canada/United Kingdom
1945	Eddie Gerard	D–LW	Canada
1945	Frank McGee	C–R	Canada
1945	Howie Morenz	C	Canada
1945	Tommy Phillips	LW–RW	Canada
1945	Harvey Pulford	D	Canada
1945	Hod Stuart	D	Canada
1945	Georges Vezina	G	Canada
1947	Russell Bowie	C–R	Canada
1947	Dit Clapper ^{[ * ]}	D–RW	Canada
1947	Aurele Joliat	LW	Canada
1947	Frank Nighbor	C	Canada
1947	Lester Patrick	D–G–R	Canada
1947	Eddie Shore	D	Canada
1947	Cyclone Taylor	C–D–R	Canada
1947	Dan Bain	C	Canada
1947	Art Ross	D	Canada
1950	Allan Davidson	RW	Canada
1950	Graham Drinkwater	D	Canada
1950	Mike Grant	D	Canada
1950	Silas Griffis	D–R	Canada/United States
1950	Newsy Lalonde	C	Canada
1950	Joe Malone	C	Canada
1950	George Richardson	D	Canada
1950	Harry Trihey	C–R	Canada
1952	Dickie Boon	D	Canada
1952	Bill Cook	RW	Canada
1952	Moose Goheen	D–LW	United States
1952	Moose Johnson	D	Canada
1952	Mickey MacKay	C–R	Canada
1952	Nels Stewart	C	Canada
1958	Frank Boucher	C	Canada
1958	King Clancy	D	Canada
1958	Sprague Cleghorn	D	Canada
1958	Alec Connell	G	Canada
1958	Red Dutton	D	Canada
1958	Frank Foyston	C	Canada
1958	Frank Fredrickson	C	Canada
1958	Herb Gardiner	D	Canada
1958	George Hay	LW	Canada
1958	Dick Irvin	C	Canada
1958	Ching Johnson	D	Canada
1958	Duke Keats	C	Canada
1958	Hughie Lehman	G	Canada
1958	George McNamara	D	Canada
1958	Paddy Moran	G	Canada
1959	Jack Adams	C	Canada
1959	Cy Denneny	LW	Canada
1959	Tiny Thompson	G	Canada
1960	Buck Boucher	D	Canada
1960	Sylvio Mantha	D	Canada
1960	Jack Walker	C–LW–R	Canada
1961	Syl Apps	C	Canada
1961	Charlie Conacher	RW	Canada
1961	Hap Day	D	Canada
1961	George Hainsworth	G	Canada
1961	Joe Hall	D–RW	Canada/United Kingdom
1961	Percy LeSueur	G–RW	Canada
1961	Frank Rankin	R	Canada
1961	Maurice Richard ^{[ * ]}	RW	Canada
1961	Milt Schmidt	C	Canada
1961	Oliver Seibert	C	Canada
1961	Bruce Stuart	R	Canada
1962	Punch Broadbent	RW	Canada
1962	Harry Hyland	RW	Canada
1962	Steamer Maxwell	R	Canada
1962	Reg Noble	C–D–LW	Canada
1962	Sweeney Schriner	LW	Canada
1962	Alf Smith	RW	Canada
1963	Harry Cameron	D	Canada
1963	Rusty Crawford	C–LW	Canada
1963	Jack Darragh	RW	Canada
1963	Jimmy Gardner	LW	Canada
1963	Billy Gilmour	RW	Canada
1963	Ebbie Goodfellow	C–D	Canada
1963	Shorty Green	F	Canada
1963	Riley Hern	G	Canada
1963	Tom Hooper	F	Canada
1963	Bouse Hutton	G	Canada
1963	Jack Laviolette	D–LW	Canada
1963	Billy McGimsie	C	Canada
1963	Didier Pitre	D–R–RW	Canada
1963	Joe Primeau	C	Canada
1963	Jack Ruttan	D	Canada
1963	Earl Seibert	D	Canada
1963	Bullet Joe Simpson	D	Canada
1963	Barney Stanley	D–RW	Canada
1963	Marty Walsh	C	Canada
1963	Harry E. Watson	C	Canada
1963	Rat Westwick	G–R	Canada
1963	Frederick Whitcroft	R	Canada
1963	Phat Wilson	D	Canada
1964	Doug Bentley	LW	Canada
1964	Bill Durnan	G	Canada
1964	Babe Siebert	D–LW	Canada
1964	Black Jack Stewart	D	Canada
1965	Marty Barry	C	Canada
1965	Clint Benedict	G	Canada
1965	Arthur Farrell	F	Canada
1965	Red Horner	D	Canada
1965	Syd Howe	D–LW	Canada
1965	Jack Marshall	C–D	Canada
1965	Bill Mosienko	RW	Canada
1965	Blair Russel	C–RW	Canada
1965	Ernie Russell	C–R	Canada
1965	Fred Scanlan	F	Canada
1966	Max Bentley	C	Canada
1966	Toe Blake	LW	Canada
1966	Emile Bouchard	D	Canada
1966	Frank Brimsek	G	United States
1966	Ted Kennedy	C	Canada
1966	Elmer Lach	C	Canada
1966	Ted Lindsay ^{[ * ]}	LW	Canada
1966	Babe Pratt	D	Canada
1966	Ken Reardon	D	Canada
1967	Turk Broda	G	Canada
1967	Neil Colville	C–D	Canada
1967	Harry Oliver	RW	Canada
1968	Bill Cowley	C	Canada
1969	Sid Abel	C–LW	Canada
1969	Bryan Hextall	RW	Canada
1969	Red Kelly ^{[ * ]}	C–D	Canada
1969	Roy Worters	G	Canada
1970	Babe Dye	RW	Canada
1970	Bill Gadsby	D	Canada
1970	Tom Johnson	D	Canada
1971	Busher Jackson	LW	Canada
1971	Gordon Roberts	LW	Canada
1971	Terry Sawchuk ^{[ * ]}	G	Canada
1971	Cooney Weiland	C	Canada
1972	Jean Beliveau ^{[ * ]}	C	Canada
1972	Bernie Geoffrion	RW	Canada
1972	Hap Holmes	G	Canada
1972	Gordie Howe ^{[ * ]}	RW	Canada
1972	Hooley Smith	C–D–RW	Canada
1973	Doug Harvey	D	Canada
1973	Chuck Rayner	G	Canada
1973	Tommy Smith	C–R–LW	Canada
1974	Billy Burch	C–D	Canada/United States
1974	Art Coulter	D	Canada
1974	Tommy Dunderdale	C	Canada/Australia
1974	Dickie Moore	LW	Canada
1975	George Armstrong	RW	Canada
1975	Ace Bailey	LW	Canada
1975	Gordie Drillon	RW	Canada
1975	Glenn Hall	G	Canada
1975	Pierre Pilote	D	Canada
1976	Johnny Bower	G	Canada
1976	Bill Quackenbush	D	Canada
1977	Alex Delvecchio	C–LW	Canada
1977	Tim Horton	D	Canada
1978	Andy Bathgate	RW	Canada
1978	Jacques Plante	G	Canada
1978	Marcel Pronovost	D	Canada
1979	Harry Howell	D	Canada
1979	Bobby Orr ^{[ * ]}	D	Canada
1979	Henri Richard	C	Canada
1980	Harry Lumley	G	Canada
1980	Lynn Patrick	C–LW	Canada
1980	Gump Worsley	G	Canada
1981	Johnny Bucyk	LW	Canada
1981	Frank Mahovlich	LW	Canada
1981	Allan Stanley	D	Canada
1982	Yvan Cournoyer	RW	Canada
1982	Rod Gilbert	RW	Canada
1982	Norm Ullman	C	Canada
1983	Ken Dryden	G	Canada
1983	Bobby Hull	LW	Canada
1983	Stan Mikita	C	Canada/Slovakia
1984	Phil Esposito	C	Canada
1984	Jacques Lemaire	C	Canada
1984	Bernie Parent	G	Canada
1985	Gerry Cheevers	G	Canada
1985	Bert Olmstead	LW	Canada
1985	Jean Ratelle	C	Canada
1986	Leo Boivin	D	Canada
1986	Dave Keon	C	Canada
1986	Serge Savard	D	Canada
1987	Bobby Clarke	C	Canada
1987	Eddie Giacomin	G	Canada
1987	Jacques Laperriere	D	Canada
1988	Tony Esposito	G	Canada
1988	Guy Lafleur	RW	Canada
1988	Buddy O'Connor^{[A]}	C	Canada
1988	Brad Park	D	Canada
1989	Herbie Lewis^{[A]}	LW	Canada
1989	Darryl Sittler	C	Canada
1989	Vladislav Tretiak	G	Russia/Soviet Union
1990	Bill Barber	LW	Canada
1990	Fernie Flaman^{[A]}	D	Canada
1990	Gilbert Perreault	C	Canada
1991	Mike Bossy	RW	Canada
1991	Denis Potvin	D	Canada
1991	Bob Pulford	C–LW	Canada
1991	Clint Smith^{[A]}	C	Canada
1992	Marcel Dionne	C	Canada
1992	Woody Dumart^{[A]}	LW	Canada
1992	Bob Gainey	LW	Canada
1992	Lanny McDonald	RW	Canada
1993	Guy Lapointe	D	Canada
1993	Edgar Laprade^{[A]}	C	Canada
1993	Steve Shutt	LW	Canada
1993	Billy Smith	G	Canada
1994	Lionel Conacher^{[A]}	D	Canada
1994	Harry P. Watson^{[A]}	LW	Canada
1995	Bun Cook^{[A]}	LW	Canada
1995	Larry Robinson	D	Canada
1996	Bobby Bauer^{[A]}	RW	Canada
1996	Borje Salming	D	Sweden
1997	Mario Lemieux ^{[ * ]}	C	Canada
1997	Bryan Trottier	C	Canada
1998	Roy Conacher^{[A]}	LW	Canada
1998	Michel Goulet	LW	Canada
1998	Peter Stastny	C	Slovakia/Czechoslovakia
1999	Wayne Gretzky ^{[ * ]}	C	Canada
2000	Joe Mullen	RW	United States
2000	Denis Savard	C	Canada
2001	Viacheslav Fetisov	D	Russia/Soviet Union
2001	Mike Gartner	RW	Canada
2001	Dale Hawerchuk	C	Canada
2001	Jari Kurri	RW	Finland
2002	Bernie Federko	C	Canada
2002	Clark Gillies	LW	Canada
2002	Rod Langway	D	United States
2003	Grant Fuhr	G	Canada
2003	Pat LaFontaine	C	United States
2004	Ray Bourque	D	Canada
2004	Paul Coffey	D	Canada
2004	Larry Murphy	D	Canada
2005	Valeri Kharlamov	LW	Soviet Union
2005	Cam Neely	RW	Canada
2006	Dick Duff	LW	Canada
2006	Patrick Roy	G	Canada
2007	Ron Francis	C	Canada
2007	Al MacInnis	D	Canada
2007	Mark Messier	C	Canada
2007	Scott Stevens	D	Canada
2008	Glenn Anderson	RW	Canada
2008	Igor Larionov	C	Russia/Soviet Union
2009	Brett Hull	RW	United States/Canada
2009	Brian Leetch	D	United States
2009	Luc Robitaille	LW	Canada
2009	Steve Yzerman	C	Canada
2010	Dino Ciccarelli	RW	Canada
2010	Angela James	C	Canada
2010	Cammi Granato	C	United States
2011	Ed Belfour	G	Canada
2011	Doug Gilmour	C	Canada
2011	Mark Howe	D	United States
2011	Joe Nieuwendyk	C	Canada
2012	Pavel Bure	RW	Russia/Soviet Union
2012	Adam Oates	C	Canada
2012	Joe Sakic	C	Canada
2012	Mats Sundin	C	Sweden
2013	Chris Chelios	D	United States
2013	Geraldine Heaney	D	Canada
2013	Scott Niedermayer	D	Canada
2013	Brendan Shanahan	LW	Canada
2014	Rob Blake	D	Canada
2014	Peter Forsberg	C	Sweden
2014	Dominik Hasek	G	Czech Republic/Czechoslovakia
2014	Mike Modano	C	United States
2015	Sergei Fedorov	C	Russia/Soviet Union
2015	Phil Housley	D	United States
2015	Nicklas Lidstrom	D	Sweden
2015	Chris Pronger	D	Canada
2015	Angela Ruggiero	D	United States
2016	Eric Lindros	C	Canada
2016	Sergei Makarov	RW	Russia/Soviet Union
2016	Rogie Vachon	G	Canada
2017	Dave Andreychuk	LW	Canada
2017	Danielle Goyette	F	Canada
2017	Paul Kariya	LW	Canada
2017	Mark Recchi	RW	Canada
2017	Teemu Selanne	RW	Finland
2018	Martin Brodeur	G	Canada
2018	Jayna Hefford	RW	Canada
2018	Martin St. Louis	RW	Canada
2018	Alexander Yakushev	LW	Soviet Union
2019	Guy Carbonneau	C	Canada
2019	Vaclav Nedomansky	C	Czech Republic/Czechoslovakia
2019	Hayley Wickenheiser	C	Canada
2019	Sergei Zubov	D	Russia
2020	Marian Hossa	RW	Slovakia
2020	Jarome Iginla	RW	Canada
2020	Kevin Lowe	D	Canada
2020	Kim St-Pierre	G	Canada
2020	Doug Wilson	D	Canada
2022	Daniel Alfredsson	RW	Sweden
2022	Roberto Luongo	G	Canada
2022	Riikka Sallinen	C	Finland
2022	Daniel Sedin	LW	Sweden
2022	Henrik Sedin	C	Sweden
2023	Tom Barrasso	G	United States
2023	Henrik Lundqvist	G	Sweden
2023	Caroline Ouellette	F	Canada
2023	Pierre Turgeon	C	Canada
2023	Mike Vernon	G	Canada
2024	Natalie Darwitz	F	United States
2024	Pavel Datsyuk	C	Russia
2024	Jeremy Roenick	C	United States
2024	Shea Weber	D	Canada
2024	Krissy Wendell-Pohl	F	United States
2025	Jennifer Botterill	F	Canada
2025	Zdeno Chara	D	Slovakia
2025	Brianna Decker	F	United States
2025	Duncan Keith	D	Canada
2025	Alexander Mogilny	RW	Russia/Soviet Union
2025	Joe Thornton	C	Canada
2026	Patrice Bergeron	C	Canada
2026	Cindy Curley	F	United States
2026	Carey Price	G	Canada
2026	Pekka Rinne	G	Finland
2026	Keith Tkachuk	LW	United States

* Indicates that the three-year waiting period was waived for a player who was deemed to be especially notable.
A. Player was inducted into the Veteran Player category. In 2000, it was merged with the Player category.

Source: 1945–2003: Honoured Members: Hockey Hall of Fame and newspapers.

=== Builders ===
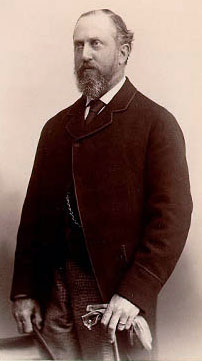
Lord Stanley, inducted in 1945

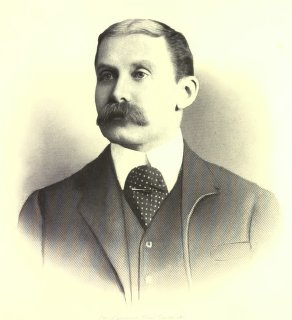
H. Montagu Allan, inducted in 1945

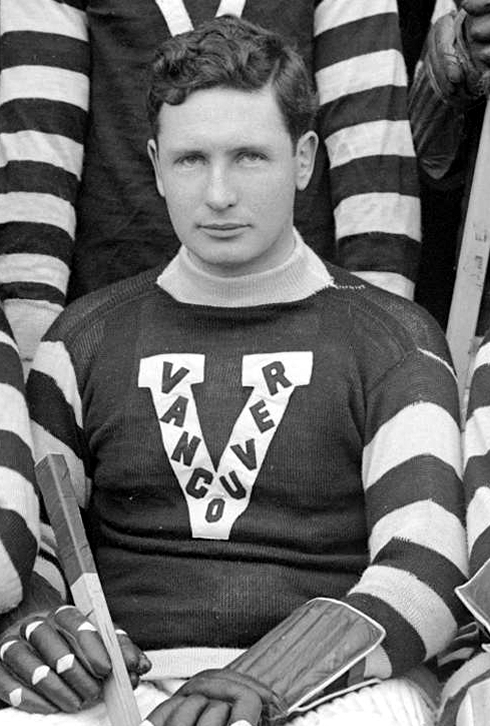
Frank Patrick, inducted in 1950

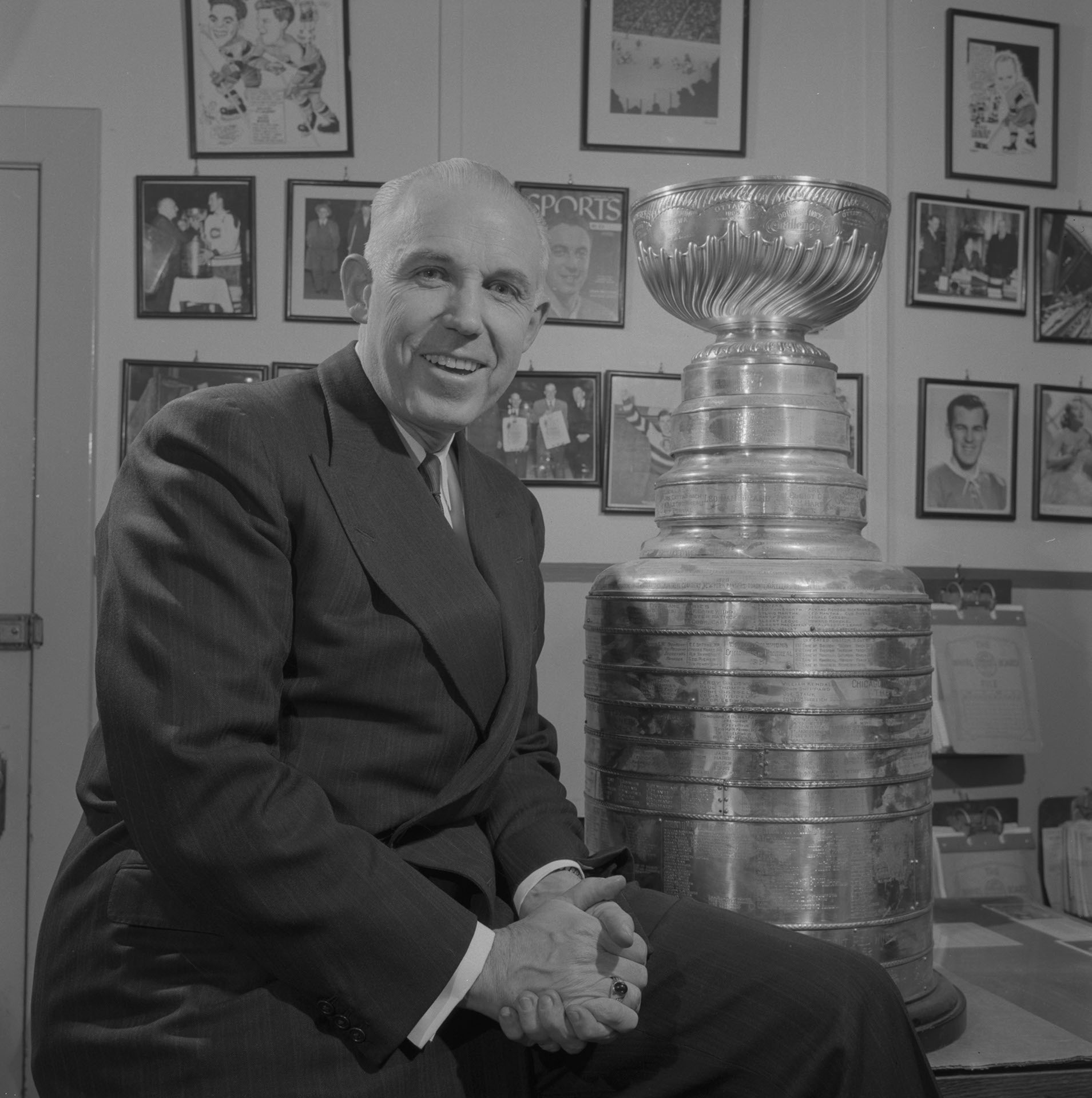
Clarence Campbell, inducted in 1966

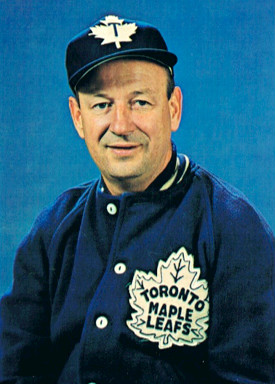
Punch Imlach, inducted in 1984

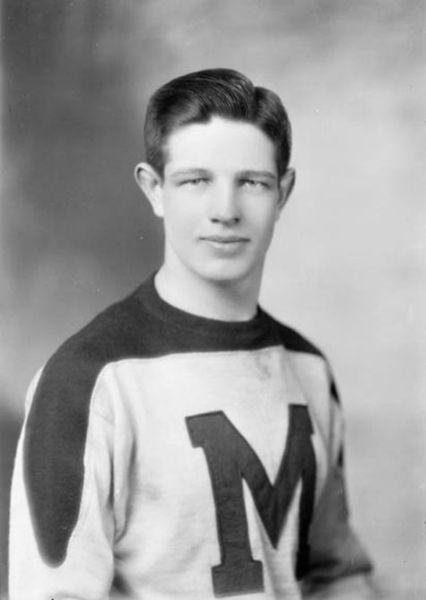
Father David Bauer, inducted in 1989

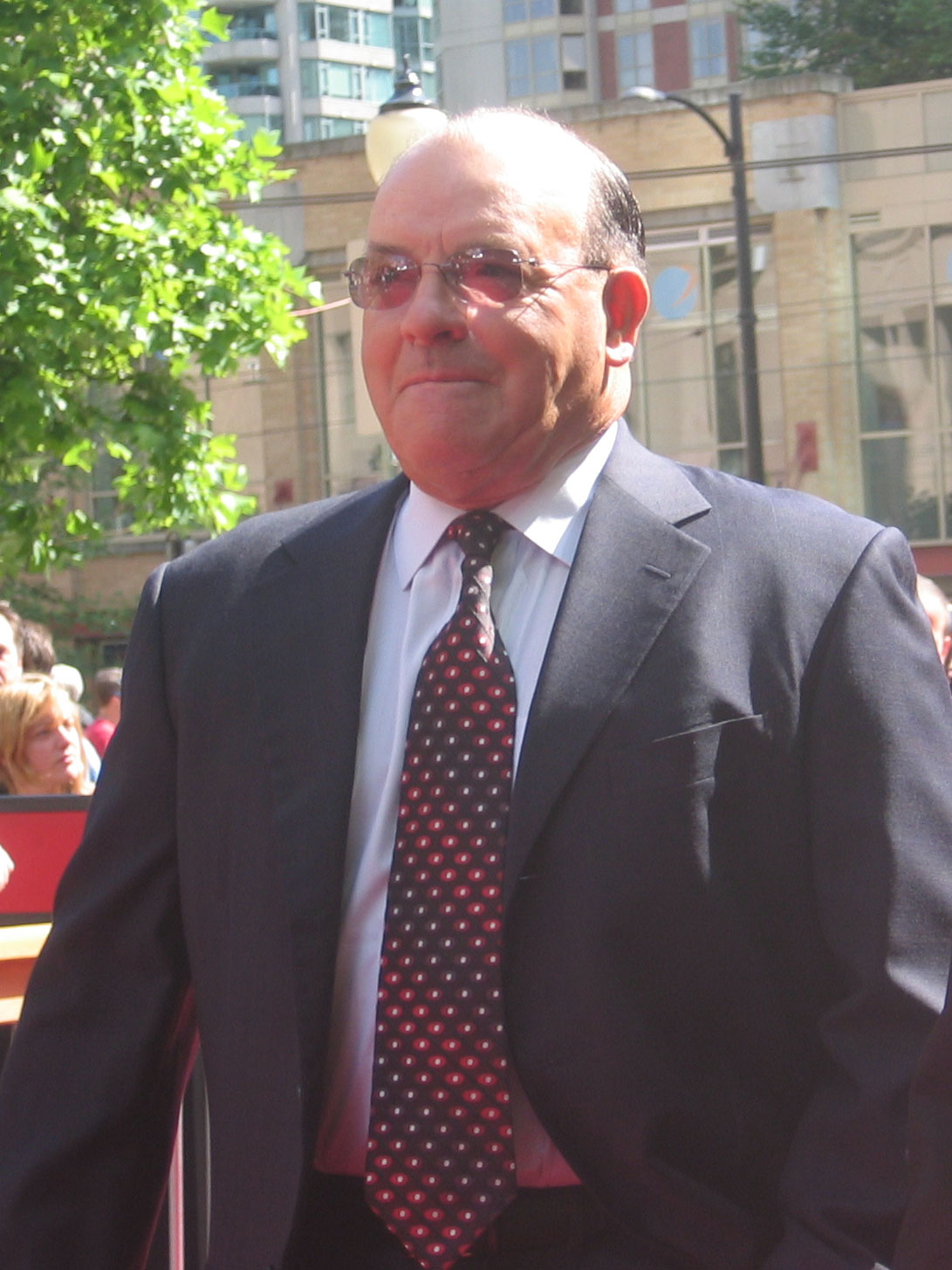
Scotty Bowman, inducted in 1991

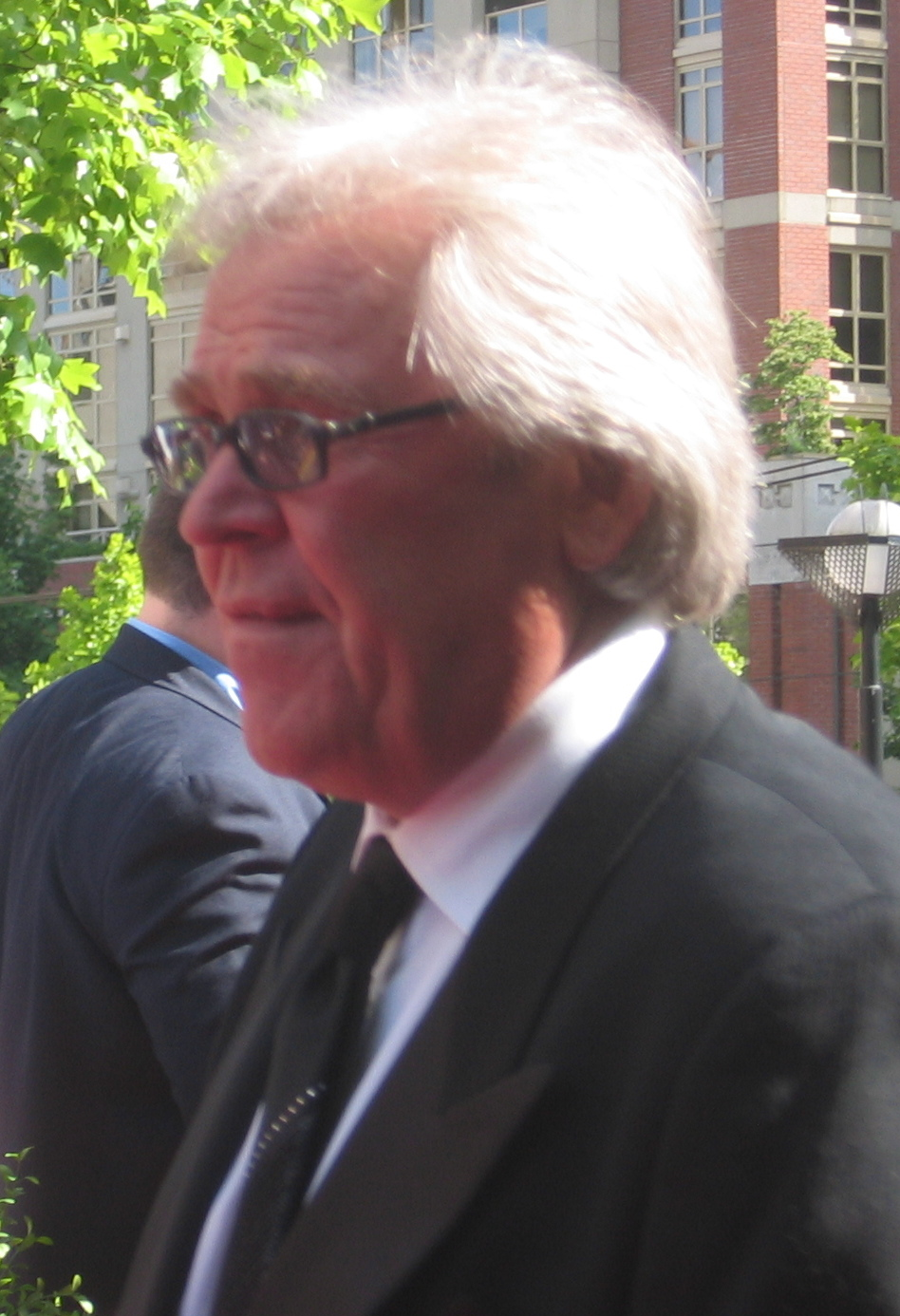
Glen Sather, inducted in 1997

The builder category has been in existence since the beginning of the Hall of Fame and the first builders were inducted in 1945. A builder is a person who has contributed to the development of the game of hockey, and as the name refers, one who has built the game forward. Since then, 102 builders have been inducted. For a person to be inducted to the Hockey Hall of Fame as a builder, they may be "active or inactive" and must be nominated by an elected 18-person selection committee. As of 2007, a maximum of two builders can be inducted in one year.

Year	Name
1945	H. Montagu Allan
1945	Frederick Stanley, 16th Earl of Derby
1947	Frank Calder
1947	W. A. Hewitt
1947	Francis Nelson
1947	William Northey
1947	John Ross Robertson
1947	Claude C. Robinson
1947	James T. Sutherland
1950	Frank Patrick
1958	George Dudley
1958	James E. Norris
1958	Al Pickard
1958	Donat Raymond
1958	Conn Smythe
1958	Lloyd Turner
1960	Charles Adams
1960	John Kilpatrick
1960	Frank J. Selke
1961	George V. Brown
1961	Paul Loicq
1961	Fred Waghorne
1962	Frank Ahearn
1962	Walter A. Brown
1962	Frederick Hume
1962	James D. Norris
1962	Ambrose O'Brien
1962	Frank Smith
1963	Leo Dandurand
1963	Tommy Gorman
1963	Frederic McLaughlin
1964	Angus Daniel Campbell
1964	Frank Dilio
1965	Foster Hewitt
1965	Tommy Lockhart
1966	Clarence Campbell
1968	Jimmy Dunn
1968	Jim Hendy
1969	Al Leader
1969	Bruce Norris
1970	Robert Lebel
1971	Arthur Wirtz
1972	Weston Adams
1973	Hartland Molson
1974	Charles Hay
1974	Tommy Ivan
1974	Anatoly Tarasov
1974	Carl Voss
1975	Frank Buckland
1975	William M. Jennings
1976	Jack Gibson
1976	Philip Dansken Ross
1976	Bill Wirtz
1977	Bunny Ahearne
1977	Harold Ballard
1977	Joseph Cattarinich
1978	Jack Bickell
1978	Sam Pollock
1978	William Thayer Tutt
1979	Gordon Juckes
1980	Jack Butterfield
1982	Emile Francis
1983	Harry Sinden
1984	Punch Imlach
1984	Jake Milford
1985	John Mariucci
1985	Rudy Pilous
1986	Bill Hanley
1987	John Ziegler
1988	Ed Snider
1989	Father David Bauer
1990	Bud Poile
1991	Scotty Bowman
1992	Keith Allen
1992	Bob Johnson
1992	Frank Mathers
1993	Frank Griffiths
1993	Seymour Knox
1993	Fred Page
1994	Brian O'Neill
1995	Günther Sabetzki
1995	Bill Torrey
1996	Al Arbour
1997	Glen Sather
1998	Athol Murray
1999	Scotty Morrison
2000	Walter Bush
2001	Craig Patrick
2002	Roger Neilson
2003	Mike Ilitch
2003	Brian Kilrea
2004	Cliff Fletcher
2005	Murray Costello
2006	Harley Hotchkiss
2006	Herb Brooks
2007	Jim Gregory
2008	Ed Chynoweth
2009	Lou Lamoriello
2010	Jim Devellano
2010	Daryl Seaman
2013	Fred Shero
2014	Pat Burns
2015	Bill Hay
2015	Peter Karmanos Jr.
2016	Pat Quinn
2017	Clare Drake
2017	Jeremy Jacobs
2018	Gary Bettman
2018	Willie O'Ree
2019	Jim Rutherford
2019	Jerry York
2020	Ken Holland
2022	Herb Carnegie
2023	Ken Hitchcock
2023	Pierre Lacroix
2024	Colin Campbell
2024	David Poile
2025	Jack Parker
2025	Daniele Sauvageau
2026	Brian Burke

==== Former members ====
On March 30, 1993, it was announced that Gil Stein, who at the time was the president of the National Hockey League, had been inducted into the Hall of Fame. There were immediate allegations that he had engineered his election through manipulation of the hall's board of directors and by telling them to change the rules for selection. Two lawyers, hired by the league to lead an investigation, recommended that Stein's selection be overturned, although it was soon revealed that Stein had previously decided to turn down the induction.

In 1989, Alan Eagleson was inducted as a builder, but he resigned from the Hall in 1998 after pleading guilty of mail fraud and embezzlement of hundreds of thousands of dollars, these crimes having been perpetrated against NHL players and tournaments. His resignation came shortly before a vote was held to expel him.

=== On-ice officials ===
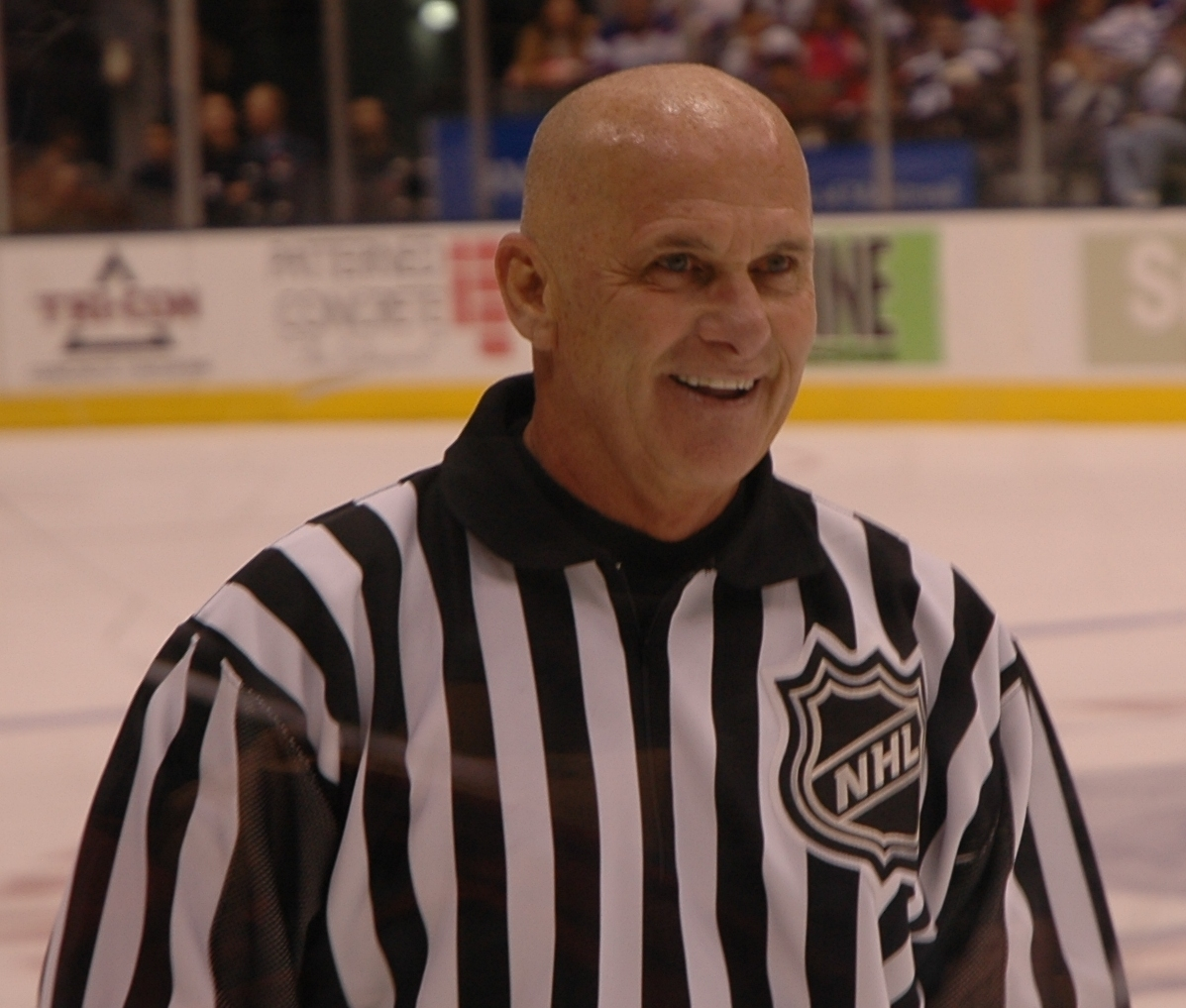
Ray Scapinello, inducted in 2008

The on-ice official category has been in existence since 1961, and 16 have been inducted. For an official to be inducted to the Hockey Hall of Fame, they must be retired for a minimum of three years and must be nominated by an elected 18-person selection committee. As of 2007, a maximum of one on-ice official can be inducted in one year.

Year	Name
1961	Chaucer Elliott
1961	Mickey Ion
1961	Cooper Smeaton
1962	Mike Rodden
1963	Bobby Hewitson
1964	Bill Chadwick
1967	Red Storey
1973	Frank Udvari
1981	John Ashley
1987	Matt Pavelich
1988	George Hayes
1991	Neil Armstrong
1993	John D'Amico
1999	Andy Van Hellemond
2008	Ray Scapinello
2014	Bill McCreary
