= Saskatchewan Order of Merit =

Civilian honour for merit in Canada

- Insignia of the Saskatchewan Order of Merit

Awarded by the lieutenant governor of Saskatchewan
- Type: Order of merit (provincial)
- Established: 1985
- Motto: Multis e gentibus vires (Latin for 'From many peoples, strength')
- Eligibility: Any current or former long-term Canadian citizen resident of Saskatchewan.
- Awarded for: Excellence, achievement, and contributions to the social, cultural and economic well-being of the province and its residents.
- Status: Currently constituted
- Founder: Frederick Johnson representing Elizabeth II
- Chancellor: Bernadette McIntyre
- Grades: Member
- Post-nominals: SOM

Statistics
- Total inductees: 262

Precedence
- Next (higher): National Order of Quebec
- Next (lower): Order of Ontario
- 1985–2005 2005–present Ribbon bars of the order

The Saskatchewan Order of Merit (Note: French: Ordre du Mérite de la Saskatchewan) is a civilian honour for merit in the Canadian province of Saskatchewan. Instituted in 1985 by Lieutenant Governor Frederick Johnson, on the advice of the Cabinet under Premier Grant Devine, the order is administered by the Governor-in-Council and is intended to honour current or former Saskatchewan residents for conspicuous achievements in any field, being thus described in law as the highest honour amongst all others conferred by the Saskatchewan Crown.

== Structure and appointment ==
The Saskatchewan Order of Merit is intended to honour any Canadian citizen currently or formerly resident in Saskatchewan who has demonstrated a high level of individual excellence and achievement in any field, improving the "social, cultural and economic well-being of the province and its residents"; the process of finding such individuals begins with call for nominations put out each spring by the Saskatchewan Honours Advisory Council. There are no limitations on population, but only ten new members may be created each year.

After the annual call for nominations, the Saskatchewan Honours Advisory Council makes its recommendations to the lieutenant governor. Posthumous nominations are accepted within one year of the date of death, and in 2001 the Provincial Emblems and Honours Act was amended to allow for honorary membership in the order, granted to those who are neither current nor former residents of Saskatchewan; Charles, Prince of Wales, was the first honorary member of the Saskatchewan Order of Merit, appointed on 24 April 2001. The lieutenant governor of Saskatchewan, who is ex officio a member and the chancellor of the Saskatchewan Order of Merit and remains a member following his or her departure from viceregal office, then makes all appointments into the fellowship's single grade of membership by letters patent bearing the viceroyal sign-manual and the Great Seal of the province; thereafter, the new members are entitled to use the post-nominal letters SOM and have their portrait added to the Athabasca Gallery at the Saskatchewan Legislative Building.

== Insignia ==
Upon admission into the Saskatchewan Order of Merit, members are presented with the order's insignia at a ceremony held either at Government House in Regina or at a venue in Saskatoon. According to The Provincial Emblems and Honours Act, which stipulates the design of the order's badges and ribbon and how they are worn, the main emblem of the order is a silver medallion in the form of a six pointed star—an abstract rendition of a western red lilly, the province's official flower. The obverse is coated in white enamel and bears the escutcheon of Coat of arms of Saskatchewan within a circular ribbon that displays the provincial motto—multis e gentibus vires (Latin for 'from many peoples strength')—all topped by St. Edward's Crown symbolizing the Canadian monarch's role as the fount of honour. This medallion is hung from a ribbon with a green-gold-green, vertical striped pattern, at the collar for men, and on a bow pinned at the left chest for women. Members also receive for wear on informal clothing a lapel pin in the form of a stylized western red lily bearing St. Edward's Crown.

== Inductees ==
The following are some notable appointees of the Saskatchewan Order of Merit:

- Murad Al-Katib, agricultural entrepreneur, appointed 2017
- Freda Ahenakew CM SOM, author and academic, appointed 2005
- John Hall Archer OC SOM, librarian and historian, appointed 1987
- Don Atchison SOM, Mayor of Saskatoon, appointed 2019
- Lorne Allan Babiuk OC SOM FRSC, immunologist, molecular virologist, and vaccinologist, appointed 2003
- Marcel Alter Baltzan OC SOM, physician and nephrologist, appointed 1999
- Lloyd Ingram Barber CC SOM, Chancellor of the University of Regina, appointed 1995
- Byrna Barclay SOM, author, appointed 2004
- Edward Dmytro Bayda SOM QC, Chief Justice of Saskatchewan, appointed 2008
- Bruce W. Beatty, graphic designer, posthumously appointed 2011
- Allan Emrys Blakeney PC OC SOM QC FRSC, Premier of Saskatchewan, appointed 2000
- Elizabeth Winifred Brewster CM SOM, poet and academic, appointed 2008
- Sharon Butala OC SOM, writer and conservationist, appointed 2009
- Angus Daniel Campbell CM SOM, founder of the Northern Ontario Hockey Association, appointed 1996
- Maria Campbell OC SOM, author, playwright, broadcaster, filmmaker, appointed 2005
- Roger Colenso Carter OC SOM QC, Dean, University of Saskatchewan College of Law, appointed 1998
- Edward Milton Culliton CC SOM QC, Chief Justice of Saskatchewan, appointed 1988
- Donald Grant Devine, Premier of Saskatchewan, appointed 2009
- Thomas Clement Douglas PC CC SOM, Premier of Saskatchewan, appointed 1985
- Joseph Fafard OC SOM, sculpture artist, appointed 2002
- Walter Henry Farquharson SOM DD, Moderator of the United Church of Canada, appointed 2007
- David Leon Kaplan CM SOM, professor, performer, and conductor, appointed 2006
- Dorothy Knowles OC SOM, landscape artist, appointed 1987.
- John Victor Hicks SOM, poet, appointed 1992
- Frederick W. Hill CM SOM, appointed 1999, businessman
- Gordon MacMurchy SOM, politician, appointed 1999
- Peggy McKercher CM SOM, Chancellor of the University of Saskatchewan, appointed 2001
- Kenneth Alexander Mitchell CM SOM, actor, appointed 2001
- Robert Joseph Ogle OC SOM, Roman Catholic priest, broadcaster, and politician, appointed 1995
- Thelma Pepper SOM, artist, appointed 2018
- William Perehudoff OC SOM, artist, appointed 1994
- Elizabeth Raum, oboist and composer, appointed 2010
- Edward Rawlinson SOM FCA, broadcaster, appointed 1989
- Garnet "Sam" Richardson SOM, Curler, appointed 2005
- Roy John Romanow PC OC SOM KC, Premier of Saskatchewan, appointed 2003
- Allen Sapp OC SOM, artist, appointed 1985
- Sandra Marie Schmirler SOM, Olympic athlete, posthumously appointed 2000
- Morris Cyril Shumiatcher OC SOM QC, civil rights lawyer, appointed 1996
- John William Tranter Spinks CC MBE SOM, appointed 1996
- Savella Stechishin CM SOM, home economist and writer, appointed 1998
- Anne Szumigalski SOM, poet, appointed 1989
- Guy Clarence Vanderhaeghe OC SOM, author, appointed 2003
- Charles III, King of Canada, appointed 2001
- Ernest Walker CM SOM, archaeologist and academic, appointed 2001
- Pamela Wallin OC SOM, television journalist and diplomat, appointed 1999
- James Vernon Weisgerber SOM DD, prelate of the Roman Catholic Church, appointed 2005
- Prince Edward, Duke of Edinburgh KG GCVO SOM ADC(P), member of the Canadian Royal Family, appointed 2005
- Stephen Worobetz OC SOM MC FRCSC, Lieutenant Governor of Saskatchewan, appointed 1999
- Clifford Emerson Wright OC SOM, Mayor of Saskatoon, appointed 1999
- Sylvia Fedoruk, Lieutenant Governor of Saskatchewan, appointed 1986

== See also ==
- Symbols of Saskatchewan
- Orders, decorations, and medals of the Canadian provinces
- Canadian honours order of wearing
