= David L. Kaplan (composer) =

- Born: David Leon Kaplan; December 12, 1923; Chicago, Illinois, US
- Died: April 6, 2015 (aged 91); Saskatoon, Saskatchewan, Canada
- Education: Roosevelt University; Oberlin College; Indiana University
- Known for: professor of music, composer, symphony conductor
- Awards: Order of Canada; Saskatchewan Order of Merit

David Leon Kaplan, CM SOM (December 12, 1923 – April 6, 2015) was a Chicago-born, U.S.-educated Canadian composer, university professor of music, performer, and conductor.

== Life and education ==
Dr. Kaplan was born in Chicago, Illinois in 1923 to a musical family. Kaplan's father, Joshua Samuel, played euphonium in a Russian army band, eventually settled in Chicago, where he played in brass bands and became a general practitioner. His mother, Nettie (née Lurie), born in Lithuania, was a piano student. Kaplan took piano lessons in elementary school and switched to the clarinet in high school, where he joined the band and discovered his love of music. He wrote his first symphony at 14.

He served with the U.S. military during the Second World War, from 1942 to 1946. During that time he played in a Special Services branch under the command of Major Wayne King, who was known then as the Waltz King of America. Kaplan credited his wartime service for exposing him to new musical styles, including jazz.

He received a Bachelor of Music from Roosevelt University in 1948, a Master of Music from Oberlin College in 1950 and a Doctor of Music from Indiana University in 1978.

Kaplan retired in the 1990s. He died in his Saskatoon home on April 6, 2015, aged 91, survived by his second wife, Suzanne, two sons and a daughter, five grandchildren and a great-granddaughter.

== Career ==
Kaplan taught at West Texas State University from 1955 to 1959 before moving to Canada in 1960, where he was a professor of music at the University of Saskatchewan. He founded its department of music, which he headed from 1966 to 1982. He also founded the university's concert band. During his time at the university, he was responsible for introducing new programs such as the BA in music and music education and graduate degrees in music education and music arts. David Kaplan served full-time at the University of Saskatchewan from 1960 to 1991. He also held teaching positions at the Chicago Conservatory of Music, the University of New Mexico, the National Music Camp in Interlochen, Michigan, and the World Youth Orchestra of Jeunesses Musicales in Spain.

From 1962 to 1972 he was the principal conductor of the Saskatoon Symphony Orchestra.

He was responsible for establishing the Festival of Faith multi-faith music festival in Saskatoon, Saskatchewan.

=== Composition ===
Kaplan arranged or composed pieces for woodwinds, including a series of 50 solos for school use written in 1985. Some of his music was published by Jack Spratt, New York, and Belwin.

=== Music education ===
Kaplan was responsible for preparing the Western Board of Music (WBM) woodwind syllabus in 1972. He also edited the school-music magazines Clarinet Corner and Band Lab during the 1950s and early 1960s.

== Awards ==
- 2002 - Member of the Order of Canada
- 2006 - Saskatchewan Order of Merit
- December 12, 2013, his 90th birthday, was declared "David L. Kaplan Day" by the Saskatoon City Council.
