= Roger Carter (academic) =

Canadian academic

Roger Colenso Carter SOM (March 23, 1922 – February 10, 2009) was a practising lawyer, law professor and Dean of the University of Saskatchewan College of Law. He is particularly notable for his contribution to enhanced access to legal education by indigenous peoples.

== History ==
Roger Carter was born in Moose Jaw, Saskatchewan, on March 23, 1922. He was called to the Saskatchewan Bar in 1948, having graduated with distinction with degrees in arts and law from the University of Saskatchewan. He practised primarily civil litigation for fifteen years thereafter. He was named a Queen's Counsel in 1958. During his time in private practice, he also became a member of the Board of Governors of the University of Saskatchewan.

In the 1962 Canadian federal election, Carter ran as a New Democrat in the riding of Prince Albert, finishing second to Prime Minister John Diefenbaker.

Carter joined the University of Saskatchewan College of Law in 1963. Further to being awarded a Cook Fellowship for the 1967-1968 academic year, Carter obtained a Master of Laws degree from the University of Michigan Law School in 1968. He was appointed Dean of the College of Law in 1968, a position he held until 1974, when he resigned to focus on the establishment of the Legal Aid program of Saskatchewan.

In 1975, Carter founded the Native Law Centre at the University of Saskatchewan, with the objective of increasing access to legal education by indigenous peoples. Carter remained as the founding director until 1981. The Native Law Center was preceded by the University of Saskatchewan's Program of Legal Studies for Native People, established by Carter in 1973 and where he also served as founding director.

For his initiatives in relation to indigenous access to legal education, Carter was made an Officer of the Order of Canada in 2001. Among other accolades, he was the recipient of the Saskatchewan Order of Merit in 1998, and was named as a Companion of the Order of Gabriel Dumont in 1989, the first non-indigenous to be so named. He received an honorary doctorate of laws from Queen's University in 1981.

Roger Carter died in Saskatoon on February 10, 2009.

1962 Canadian federal election: Prince Albert
Party	Candidate	Votes	%	±%
Progressive Conservative	John Diefenbaker	18,276	70.8	-1.3
New Democratic	Roger C. Carter	4,173	16.2	-0.7
Liberal	George William Newell	2,745	10.6	-0.4
Social Credit	Ken Solheim	627	2.4	
Total valid votes		25,821	100.0	

Note: NDP vote is compared to CCF vote in 1958 election.
