= Marc Baltzan =

Canadian physician and nephrologist

Marc Baltzan OC SOM FRCPC
- Born: Marcel Alter Baltzan; October 31, 1929; Saskatoon, Saskatchewan, Canada
- Died: January 1, 2005 (aged 75); Saskatoon, Saskatchewan, Canada
- Occupations: Physician and nephrologist
- Known for: Pioneer in the field of kidney research

Marcel Alter Baltzan (October 31, 1929 – January 1, 2005) was a Canadian physician and nephrologist who was a pioneer in the field of kidney research. He was a member of the team that performed Canada's second kidney transplant in Saskatchewan in 1964.

== Life ==
Born in Saskatoon, Saskatchewan, the son of David M. Baltzan and Rose Cristall, Baltzan received a Bachelor of Science degree in 1949 and a medical degree in 1953 from McGill University. He further studied at Johns Hopkins Hospital and returned to Saskatoon in 1959 to set up a private practice with his father and two brothers. Marc had three children: Dr Marc Baltzan Jr, Frances Baltzan and Beth Baltzan.

He introduced kidney replacement therapy to Saskatoon with the first kidney dialysis unit at Saskatoon's St. Paul's Hospital, then kidney transplants in 1963. He was also politically active in the genesis of medicare and its evolution in the second half of the twentieth century.

He was president of the Canadian Medical Association, president of the Saskatchewan Medical Association and chair of the department of medicine at the University of Saskatchewan.

== Honours ==
In 1995, he was made an Officer of the Order of Canada in recognition for being "a pioneer in the field of kidney research". In 1999, he was awarded the Saskatchewan Order of Merit and was made a Master of the American College of Physicians. In 2004, he was awarded an honorary Doctor of Science from the University of Saskatchewan.

== Death ==
On January 1, 2005 he died in his sleep in Saskatoon, Saskatchewan due to heart disease.
