= Thelma Pepper =

Canadian artist (1920–2020)

- Born: 28 July 1920; Kingston, Nova Scotia
- Died: 1 December 2020 (aged 100); Saskatoon, Saskatchewan
- Known for: Photographer
- Awards: Saskatchewan Order of Merit

Thelma Vivian Pepper SOM (born 1920 in Kingston, Nova Scotia; died 2020 in Saskatoon, Saskatchewan) was a Canadian artist. She was known for her work as a portrait photographer, which she took up later in life at the age of 60. Her first solo exhibition was in 1986. Themes in her photographs focus on "spirit, community, and little-known stories." Thelma's photographs can be found in archives, galleries and institutions across Saskatchewan.

She has achieved regional, national and international recognition for her work, which documents the impact of locations and economic realities on individual lives. Her artistic practice focussed on building a sense of trust with her subjects, attained by listening to their personal stories and life challenges. This trust building significantly contributed to her photographic process. The resulting portraits focus on the inner, emotional and spiritual truths of her subjects. She was especially focussed on capturing the lives and experiences of women. When she first began photographing people, she only took head-and-shoulders images. She said, "I was so wrapped up in the facial expression that it was sort of scary for me to capture what’s beyond it. But once I got to know people and got to see where they homesteaded, it was much easier for me to take larger images, to include the environment."

In addition to photography, Pepper also interviewed many women in long term care homes and isolated communities about their lives on the Prairies. Her photographs of elders in small towns are framed through a lens of compassion, dignity and intimacy, characterized by her curiosity and warmth, which put her subjects at ease.

== Early life ==
Pepper's father and her grandfather were amateur photographers. In her early life, during the second world war, she would help her father to photograph pilots landing at a nearby air base. They would develop the prints and distribute them to the pilots’ families. Pepper studied science at Acadia University and received a Master of Science in botany from McGill University before moving to Saskatoon in 1949 with her husband Jim, who was also a scientist. She had four children.

== Career ==
Thelma Pepper's first exhibition titled "A Visual Heritage, Images of the Past, 1900—1930" featured prints from her father's and grandfather's negatives. It was shown at the Macdonald Museum in Middleton, Nova Scotia in 1983 as well as the Diefenbaker Centre in Saskatoon, Saskatchewan from 1986–7.

She volunteered at a local nursing home after her children left home and also bought a top-of-the-line Rolleiflex camera. She joined a local artist-run centre called the Photographers Gallery, and began participating in exhibitions.

While volunteering at the local seniors’ home, she began interviewing and photographing the women who lived there. This work, led to the exhibition "Decades of Voices" in 1996. Pepper's next project from 1996 documented the lives of 10 pioneers living along Highway 41 in Saskatchewan, which led to an exhibition titled "Spaces of Belonging: a Journey along Highway 41.”

“Untie the Spirit" was a work Pepper compiled in 2006 to document life at the Sherbrooke Community Centre, a long-term care facility in Saskatoon. She worked with artist Jeff Nachtigall when the Centre incorporated healing arts as part of treating the whole person through art, music, children, pets and plants. A 2009 National Film Board documentary A Year at Sherbrooke chronicles Pepper and fellow artist Jeff Nachtigall, as they work with the residents of Sherbrooke Community Centre.

Her book Human Touch: Portraits of Strength, Courage & Dignity was shortlisted for the Book of the Year at the 2011 Saskatchewan Book Awards. The book included a collection of over 50 portrait images selected from Pepper’s entire body of work of 2,350 printed photographs. The book includes essays by Elizabeth Philips, Grant Arnold and poetry by Lorna Crozier.

Pepper's centenary in 2020 was marked by the publication of a biography titled Thelma: A Life in Pictures by Saskatoon writer Amy Jo Ehman. The book includes photographs of Pepper, from childhood to the present, alongside some of the portraits she took of others.

== Awards ==
On 24 September 2014 Pepper received the Lieutenant Governor's Arts Award for Lifetime Achievement for her life's work as a significant and treasured Saskatchewan artist.

Pepper was awarded the Saskatchewan Order of Merit on 23 May 2018.

== Exhibitions ==
- "A Visual Heritage, Images of the Past, 1900—1930." Macdonald Museum, Middleton, Nova Scotia. (1983)
- "A Visual Heritage, Images of the Past, 1900—1930." Diefenbaker Centre, Saskatoon, Saskatchewan. (1986–87)
- "Decades of Voices: Saskatchewan Pioneer Women,” The Photographers Gallery (National Tour, 1990–1993)
- "Decades of Voices-Permanent Collection," Kenderdine Art Gallery: University of Saskatchewan, Saskatoon. (1995)
- "Spaces of Belonging – A Journey Along Hwy 41," (1996)
- "Untie the Spirit," (2006)
- "Highway 41 Revisited." The Gallery/Art Placement Inc., Saskatoon, Saskatchewan (2014)
- "Ordinary Women," Remai Modern and University of Saskatchewan Art Galleries (February 2021)
