= Byrna Barclay =

Canadian writer and editor (1940–2023)

Byrna Robin Barclay SOM (née Burton; October 8, 1940 – May 7, 2023) was a Canadian writer and editor in Saskatchewan.

== Early life ==
Barclay was born and raised in Saskatoon, Saskatchewan. In 1962, she moved to Regina, Saskatchewan.

== Career ==
Barclay served as president of the Saskatchewan Writers Guild and the Saskatchewan Book Awards, and also was editor of Freelance, the Guild's newsletter, and fiction editor of Grain, its literary journal. She was founding editor of Transition, a magazine for the Saskatchewan branch of the Canadian Mental Health Association. She was also vice-chair of the Saskatchewan Arts Board.

== Honours ==
In 2004, Barclay was named to the Saskatchewan Order of Merit.

== Personal life and death ==
Barclay married Ronald Barclay and together they had two children. She died on May 7, 2023, at the age of 82.

== Bibliography ==
Her works include:

- Summer of the Hungry Pup (1982), which received the Saskatchewan Culture and Youth First Novel Award
- The Last Echo (1983)
- Winter of the White Wolf (1985)
- From the Belly of a Flying Whale (1988)
- Crosswinds (1996), which won the Best Fiction category of the Saskatchewan Book Awards
- Searching for the Nude in the Landscape (1997)
- Girl at the Window (2004), which won the Readers' Choice Award of the Saskatchewan Book Awards
- The Forest Horses (2010)
- House of the White Elephant (2015)
