= Elizabeth Raum =

Canadian oboist and composer (born 1945)

Elizabeth Raum SOM
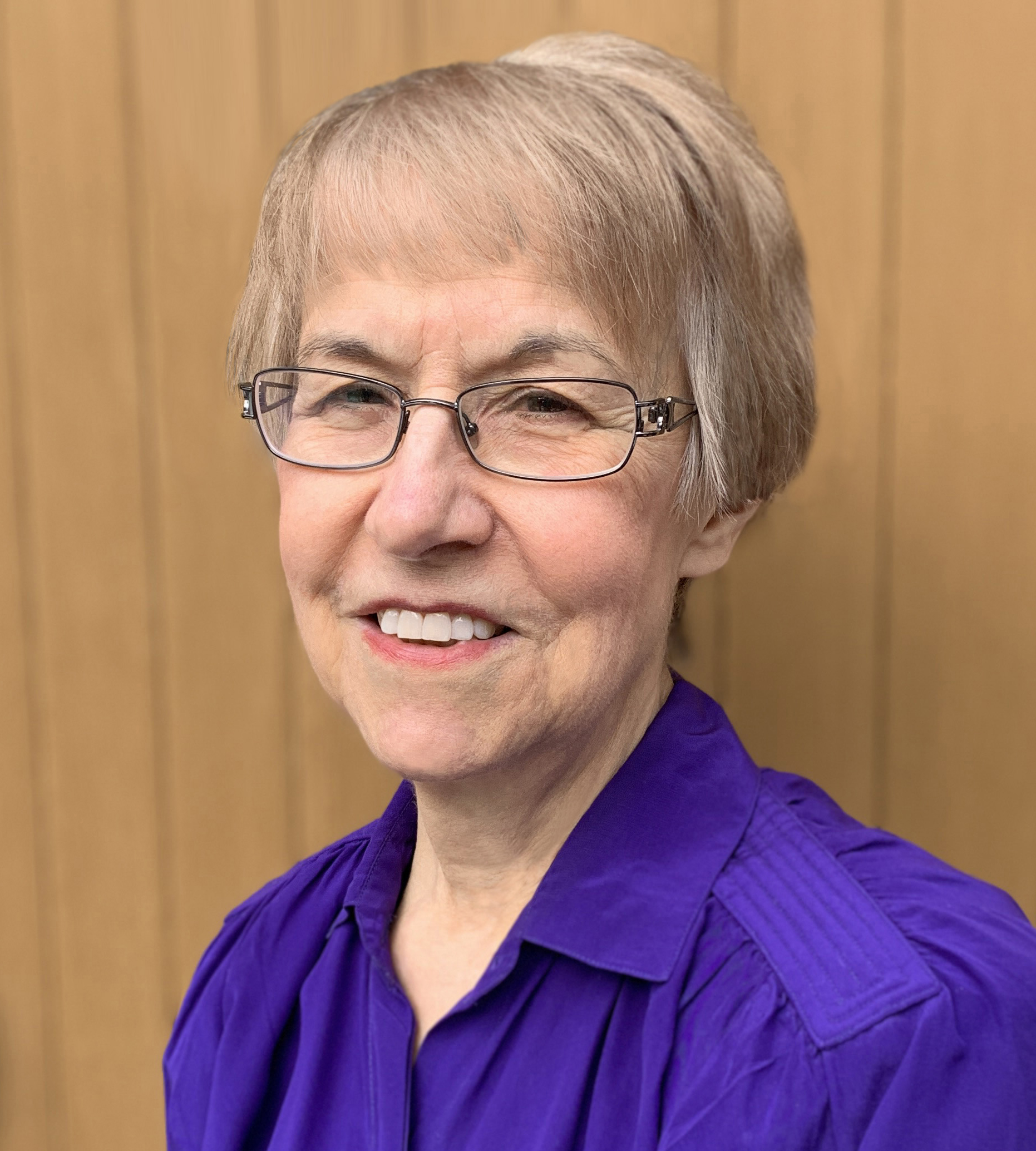
- Elizabeth Raum, 2021

Background information
- Born: 13 January 1945 (age 81); Berlin, New Hampshire
- Genres: Classical
- Occupations: Composer, musician
- Instrument: Oboe
- Website: http://elizabethraum.com

Elizabeth Raum SOM (born 13 January 1945) is a Canadian oboist and composer.

== Biography ==
Elizabeth Raum was born in Berlin, New Hampshire in 1945, but became a Canadian citizen in 1985.

She studied oboe performance with Robert Sprenkle at the Eastman School of Music, graduating in 1966. In 1985, she received a master's degree in composition from the University of Regina after studies with Thomas Schudel.

She played principal oboe for the Atlantic Symphony Orchestra in Halifax, Nova Scotia, from 1968 to 1975, when she moved to Saskatchewan and began playing for the Regina Symphony Orchestra, eventually becoming their principal oboist.

In 2004, she received an honorary doctorate from Mount Saint Vincent University, Halifax, Nova Scotia. In 2010, she received the Saskatchewan Order of Merit for her work as a musician and composer.

== Selected works ==
Elizabeth Raum's works have been performed internationally and broadcast on national media. She has produced operas, chamber pieces, choral works, solo vocal works, and ballets. She has also written for film and video.

=== Film ===
- Saskatchewan River
- Like Mother, Like Daughter
- Sparkle
- Evolution: A Theme with Variations
- Prelude to Parting
- The Green Man Ballet
- Symphony of Youth

=== Opera ===
- Sortilegio
- The Garden of Alice
- Romance of the Gods

=== Recordings ===
- Prairie Alphabet Musical Parade
- A Prairie Alphabet
- The Legend of Heimdall
- Renovated Rhymes
- Incantations and Rhymes
- Sonata for Piano Four Hands
- Requiem for Wounded Knee
- Pantheon for violin, horn, and piano
- how bodies leave ecstatic marks
- Scenes from Andalusia
