= Lloyd Turner =

Canadian ice hockey pioneer (1884–1976)

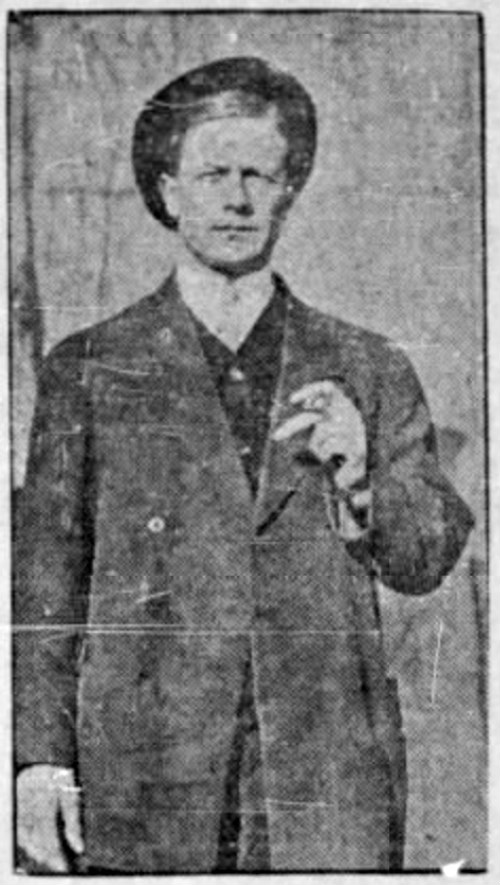
- Born: James Lloyd Turner; August 9, 1884; Elmvale, Ontario, Canada
- Died: April 7, 1976 (aged 91)
- Known for: Ice hockey executive

James Lloyd Turner (August 9, 1884 – April 7, 1976) was a Canadian ice hockey manager and executive. He was born in Elmvale, Ontario.

== Career ==
Turner's first real experience with hockey began in Sault Ste. Marie, Ontario. He played on an amateur team with his three brothers. In his spare time, he worked at the local rink, managing it and making its ice. Despite becoming involved in hockey, Turner was still primarily a baseball player. When he moved to Calgary, Alberta in 1907, Turner played as the catcher for the team in Calgary, where he was the only non-American player in the Western Canada Baseball League. However, this is where his reputation as a hockey promoter grew.

At the time, hockey was still young throughout Western Canada, and one of his primary goals was to help establish the game. He met the task by converting a roller skating rink to a hockey rink, and followed through by establishing a team and league. When the arena burned down in 1915, he built a nearby outdoor facility so the team would not have to stop playing.

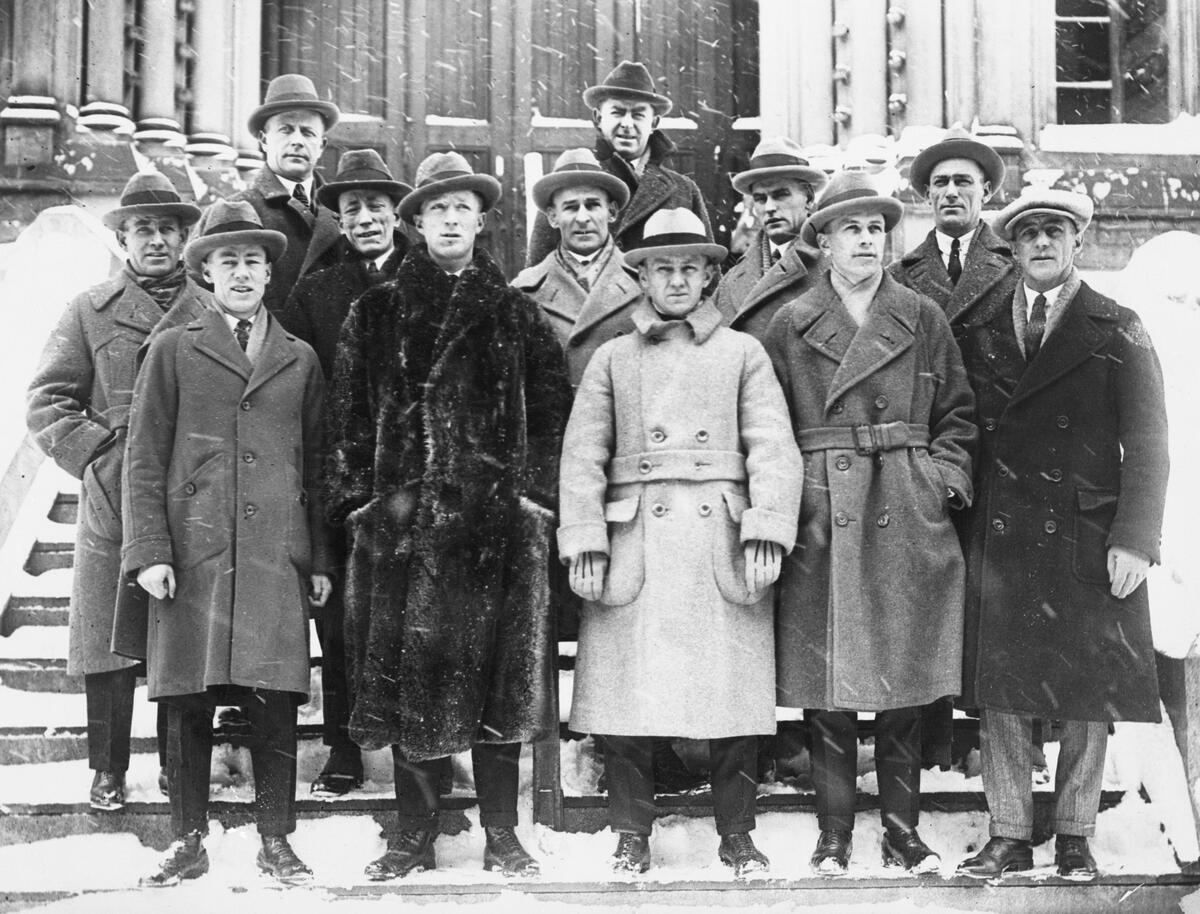
Lloyd Turner, far left in the top row, with the Calgary Tigers in 1924.

In what was arguably his most notable achievement, Turner started up two teams each in Calgary and Edmonton, two of which eventually became the foundation of the Western Canada Hockey League. He personally managed the Calgary Tigers, who played so well in the WCHL that they challenged the Montreal Canadiens for the Stanley Cup in 1924, albeit in a losing effort. Afterwards, he managed the Minneapolis Millers of the American Hockey Association and led them to a championship in 1926. Soon after, he flew back to the west to manage the Seattle Eskimos of the Pacific Coast Hockey League.

In the 1930s, Turner changed his focus to senior amateur hockey. He wanted to raise the profile of the Allan Cup, so he promised to pay W. G. Hardy, then-president of the Canadian Amateur Hockey Association (CAHA), $1,500 for every tournament finals game played in Calgary. By 2006 standards, this is about $20,000 per game. Turner paid to have fans shuttled in via train from as far as 150 miles away. Thanks to media coverage, the popularity of the tournament skyrocketed, and the CAHA raised a significant amount of funds.

Turner created and managed several more leagues, teams, and tournaments throughout his life. He concentrated efforts on creating military and civilian tournaments, and he organized the Southern Alberta Indian Tournament, a competition for the First Nations tribes of Alberta. For this, he received the honorary title of Chief Sitting Bull.

In 1958, Turner was inducted into the Hockey Hall of Fame as a builder, and in 1980, he was inducted into the Alberta Sports Hall of Fame for contributions to hockey. He was one of the first 25 members of the Hockey Hall of Fame.
