= Angus Campbell (ice hockey) =

Canadian ice hockey player (1884–1976)

SOM Angus Campbell
- Hockey Hall of Fame, 1964 (Builder)
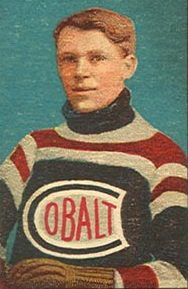
- Born: March 19, 1884 Stayner, Ontario, Canada
- Died: March 5, 1976 (aged 91) Toronto, Ontario, Canada
- Position: Left Wing
- Shot: Left
- Played for: Cobalt Silver Kings
- Playing career: 1908–1920

Angus Daniel Campbell (March 19, 1884 – March 5, 1976) was the founder of the Northern Ontario Hockey Association (NOHA), an executive member of the Ontario Hockey Association (OHA) and a member of the Hockey Hall of Fame.

== Biography ==
As a young man, Campbell played hockey both at the University of Toronto, where he was a student and in the Cobalt Mines' League in northeastern Ontario. On October 8, 1919, he was a founding member of the Northern Ontario Hockey Association (NOHA).

Professionally, Campbell was a successful mining engineer for McIntyre-Porcupine Mines Ltd. and other companies. He served a term as president of the Professional Engineers of Ontario. After his retirement, he moved to Toronto, Ontario. He died in 1976.
