= Culture of Saskatchewan =

Coat of arms of Saskatchewan

Culture of Saskatchewan views the patterns of human activity in the central prairie province of Canada examining the way people live in the geography, climate, and social context of Saskatchewan.

First Nations and fur traders adopted a transhumance and hunting and gathering lifestyle to fulfill their economic and sustenance needs. Early homesteaders and settlers in the 19th and early 20th centuries likewise spent the majority of their time proving up their homesteads, tilling the land and providing subsistence agricultural products for their families. The early 20th century developed successful agricultural practices, and society rejoiced in the Roaring Twenties. The depression and drought years of the dirty thirties took agricultural sustenance away. Electricity was made available throughout the various Saskatchewan regions. The economy saw a growth not only in the agricultural sector, but labour was also freed up to pursue choices other than agriculture. 1940s onward, a major breakthrough was seen in the arts and culture scene in Saskatchewan. Arts and cultural activities before this date were of the main on a family, individual and unpaid level. Local schools would host plays, family or tribal members would engage in handcrafts of various sorts which may become heirlooms, communities would come together for engagement in various sports activities for recreation. The Royal Commission on National Development in the Arts, Letters and Sciences prepared the Massey Report in the early 1950s. This commission noted the strengths and weakness of the cultural community and led to the establishment of the Canada Council which promoted burgeoning talent.

"the commissioners set about to search for 'what can make our country great, and what can make it one" - Massey Commission

The Saskatchewan government also showed support on a cultural level, with the creation of the Arts Board, and promotion of the Golden Jubilee celebrations hosted in 1955.

== Museums and cultural institutions ==
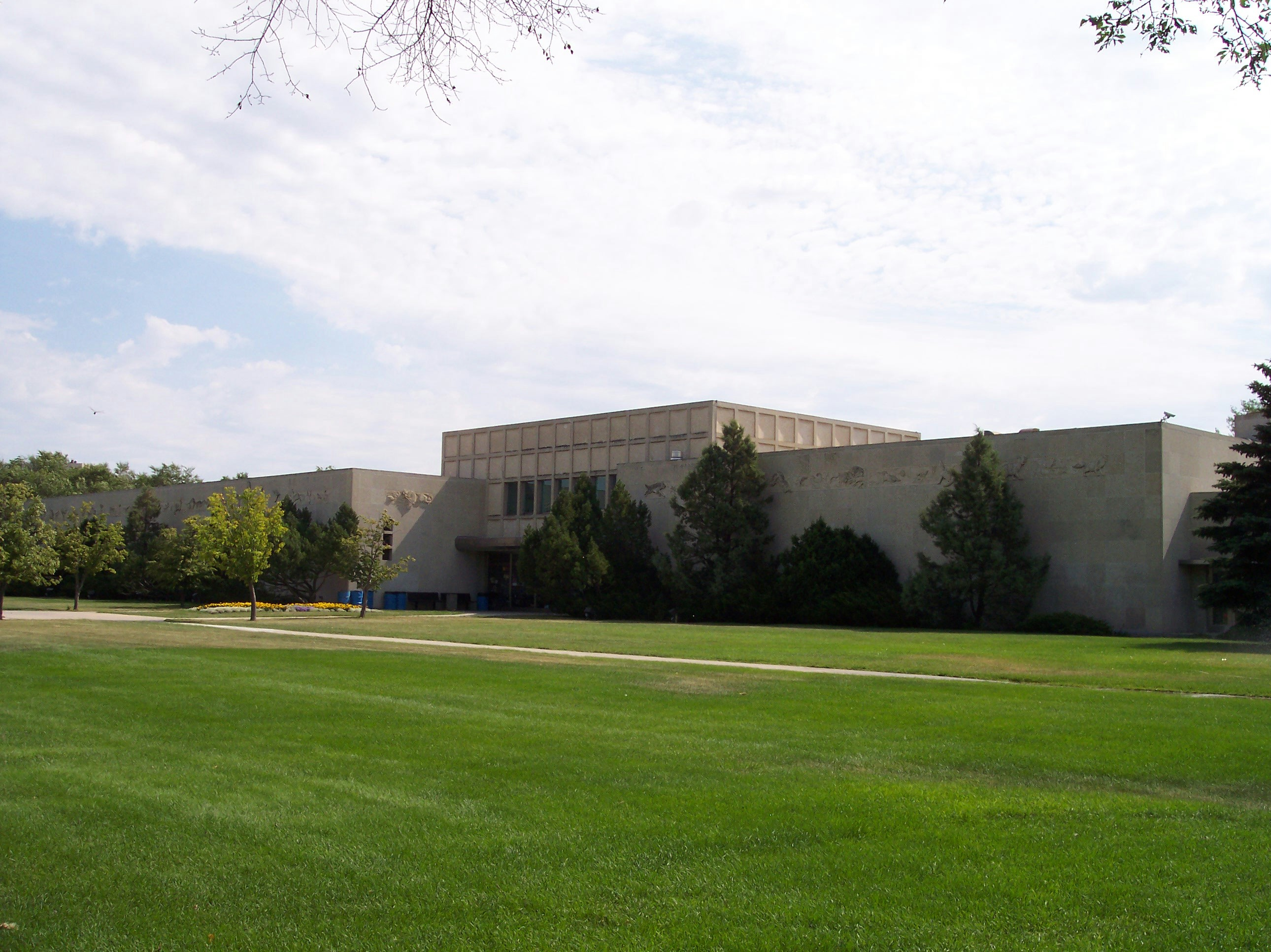
Royal Saskatchewan Museum Regina

There are numerous heritage and cultural attractions in the province of Saskatchewan. Museums, dinosaur digs, aboriginal cultural and heritage sites, art galleries, professional sport venues, spas, handcraft, antique and tea shops, agricultural tours, live theatres and archaeological sites comprise over 600 varied Saskatchewan institutions. Saskatchewan is home to two prominent spas, in Moose Jaw and Watrous, ten provincial historical parks and seven main National Historic Sites.

Along with the Saskatchewan Western Development Museums, there are over 200 local pioneer heritage museums. Travelling exhibits help to supplement the permanent groupings of each institution. The Saskatchewan Museum of Natural History officially opened in Regina in the spring of 1955.

== Development of Saskatchewan culture ==
The Saskatchewan lifestyle and culture was inter-related with and depended on the ethnic bloc settlement, geo-physical area and rural or urban community. Saskatchewan culture has historically been heavily influenced by English, German, Ukrainian, Russian, French, Irish, Scottish and Aboriginal cultures and traditions, and over time has been greatly influenced by American culture due to its proximity and the interchange of human capital.

=== Aboriginal influences ===
Clovis culture and prehistoric primitive culture is depicted in archaeological findings. The nomadic hunter-gatherer lifestyle of the First Nations developed leather working as a necessity for clothing. Trading fur for beads led to development of a new handcraft of beadwork and weaving. The First Nations of Saskatchewan are still renowned for their pow-wow dance, drumming and music.

=== Bilingualism, multiculturalism, foreign influences, American influences ===
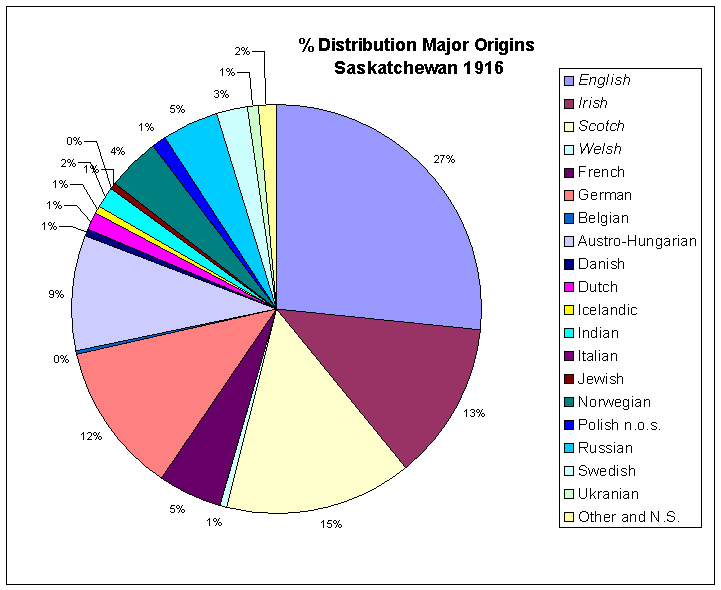
Per cent proportion of the population of each specified origin by nativity of the total population of Saskatchewan, 1916.

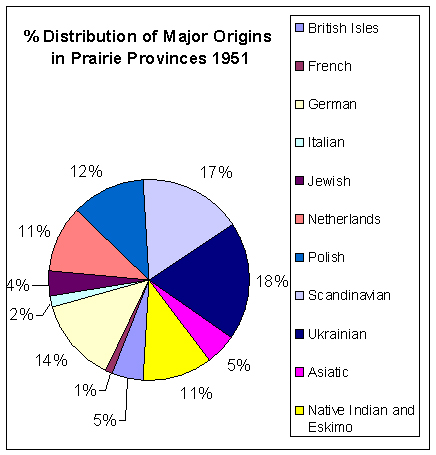
Percentage distribution of the major origins by regions, 1951 prairie provinces.

Clifford Sifton established colonial offices in Europe and the United States to encourage immigration from Britain and the United States, and by Ukrainians, Doukhobors, and other groups from the Austrian Empire to populate the Canadian West. Between 1891 and 1914 was the largest influx of immigration to the North West Territories and the province of Saskatchewan. The French Métis in Duck Lake and St. Louis of 1870, Qu'Appelle Farming colony and Bell Farm of 1880, Cannington Manor of 1882, East London Artisans Colony of 1884, The New Elsass German block colony of 1885, New Stockholm Swedish colony of 1885, Rosthern Mennonite Colony of 1893, Montmartre/Grenfell Galician settlement of 1896, and the Good Spirit Lake Doukhobor Annex (Devils Lake colony) of 1899 are just a few of the earliest ethnic bloc settlements established in the 19th century in the early North West Territories.

Ethnic block settlements of this early time concentrated on developing their agricultural methods, and then establishing churches and schooling. Religion and education was based on what they knew from their home country. World War I showed that there was a need for a common identity and language in Canada and the west. Schools established a provincial curriculum and standard language. The cultural identity shifted from the homeland to creating a new society and culture with a single unifying language to aid economics and social growth. World War II again emphasized a need for an identity which was truly and uniquely Canadian, which was also a desired norm in Saskatchewan.

=== Geography, climate, and immigration ===
Northern Saskatchewan is home to the Dene and archaeological findings such as the aboriginal rock paintings of the Churchill River, petroglyphs as well as history of early trading posts such as Stanley Mission. The Palliser Expedition described an arid geographic region unfit for human habitation known as the Palliser's Triangle. The first capital of the North-West Territories moved from Fort Pitt to Battleford, Saskatchewan Provisional District (1876–1883). Near the northern tree line, and the main economic industry of fur trapping were the fastest-growing trading posts and early settlements such as Prince Albert. The first survey for the transcontinental railway was between Winnipeg and Edmonton through the settled areas of Battleford and Prince Albert.

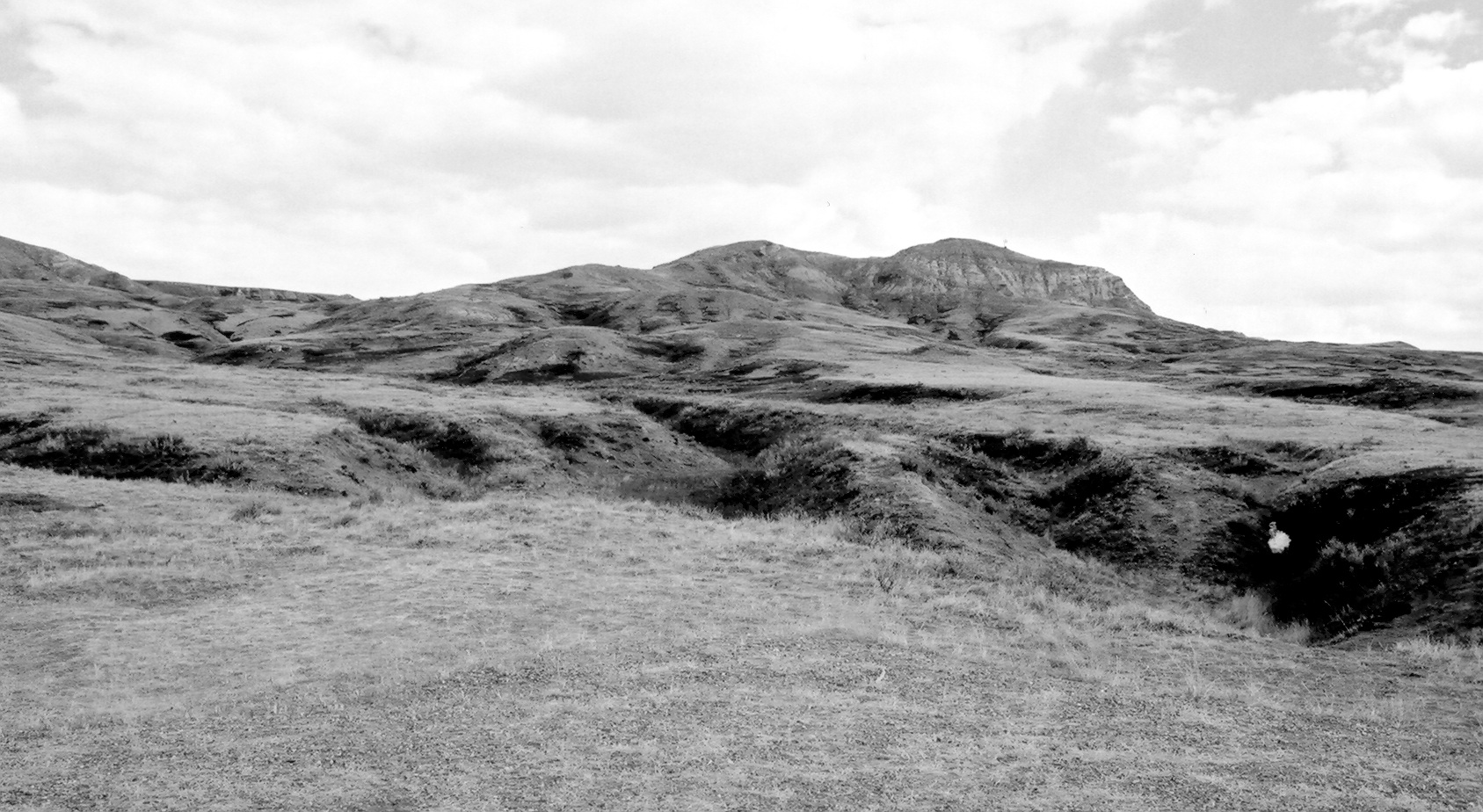
Badlands south Saskatchewan

In southern Saskatchewan the land was suitable for early ranching and cattle grazing enterprises. Ranchers replaced grazing buffalo herds with large spreads and community pastures. Sparse population dotted the southern landscape in the 19th century. Among the First Nations, the 49th parallel north was nicknamed the Medicine Line because of its seemingly magical ability to prevent U.S. soldiers from crossing it. The Big Muddy Badlands have a reputation for outlaw history, and hide-out caves. The Canadian Pacific Railway (CPR) Soo Line Railroad arrived in Moose Jaw in 1882 from Chicago, giving Moose Jaw the moniker of Little Chicago. Gangsters such as Al Capone used the tunnels of Moose Jaw for bootlegging in the prohibition years 1917–1924. Chinese immigrants used the tunnels as hideaways and homes during an era of anti-Chinese sentiments. The rise of the Cypress Hills massacre, bootlegging activities, outlaws and gangsters outrunning the United States law gave rise to new fort outposts such as Fort Walsh, and North-West Mounted Police (NWMP) barracks, the history of which is recounted at the Royal Canadian Mounted Police (RCMP) Centennial Museum.

On July 8, 1874, the NWMP began their March West, which brought law and order to the southern area of the NWT. The Dominion government and CPR examined the report given by John Macoun, botanist to the 1872 Sandford Fleming railway route expedition. Settlement could be established under the safety of the NWMP and this new promise of agricultural colonization, so constructing a southern transcontinental railway helped maintain the Canadian identity near the 49th parallel, which was under encroachment by the American expansionists.

Central Saskatchewan recounts the history of the various battles of the North-West Rebellion at Batoche and Fort Carlton. Regina attained national prominence in 1885 during the North-West Rebellion despite the fact that the Canadian Pacific Railway had still only reached the formerly designated territorial headquarters of Troy (Qu'Appelle) 48 km (30 mi) to the east. As the railways arrived, immigrants arrived in greater quantities than via Red River Cart via trail and ferry as well. Ethnic bloc settlements, and communities situated on the rail line grew quickly. Immigrants settled near others who they could communicate with, so those of like languages settled together for neighborly homestead improvements, harvesting co-operation and, economic necessity.

=== Rural living patterns ===
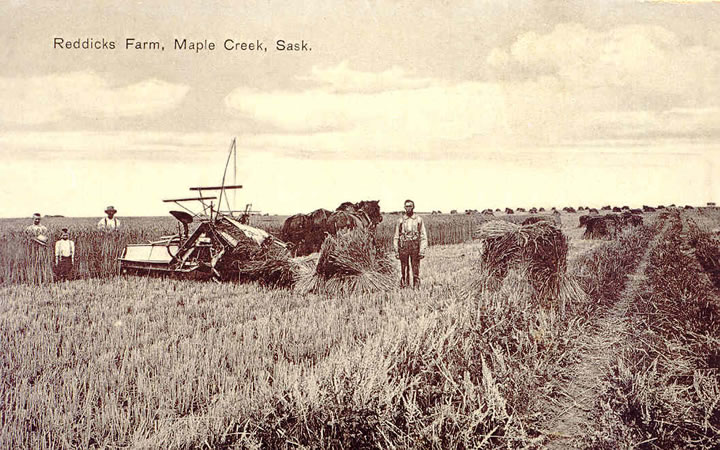
Harvest Maple Creek

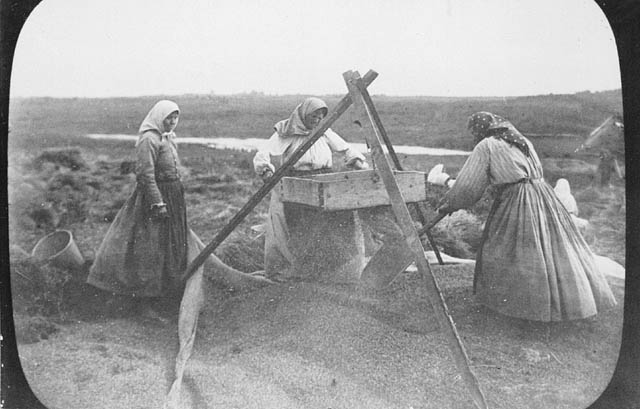
Doukhobor women winnowing grain, Saskatchewan, 1899

Primary industries were agriculture in the rural south and central region, fishing and forestry in the rural northern region. The Dominion Land Act of 1872 offered pioneers an opportunity to prove up a quarter section of land (one hundred and sixty acres (a quarter square mile, 65 hectares).) in Western Canada for a $10.00 filing fee. The improvements needed to acquire the land were labour-intensive, and settlers farmed in family groups or ethnic bloc settlements of the same language to assist one another. Early homesteaders grew mainly subsistence crops which would feed their own family and livestock.

Pioneer activities supported harvest work groups, recreational sports, pioneer farm exhibitions, rodeos and community dances to provide support and social interaction for isolated neighbors who lived a 1/4 mile (0.40 km) apart from each other. The Industrial Revolution modernized the farming industry as mechanized vehicles replaced the long hours of oxen ploughed land or the horse-drawn cart. Farms became much larger, and mechanized, evolving towards industrial agriculture.

=== Urban living patterns ===
Moose Jaw became the first city of Saskatchewan in 1903. Pile O'Bones, renamed Regina in 1882, was declared the Territorial Capital in 1883, became a city in 1903, and the capital of Saskatchewan in 1906. Prince Albert attained city status next in 1904. The Barr colonists arrived in Saskatoon in 1883, the Qu'Appelle, Long Lake and Saskatchewan Railway (QLLR) in 1890, and Saskatoon attained city status in 1906, and is presently the province's largest city.

The urban centers brought a mix of ethnic and religious settlers, and those who weren't agricultural homesteaders but brought with themselves a trade or professional calling. Regina developed around the newly formed legislature and North-West Mounted Police Barracks. Saskatoon developed around the arrival of the three major rail lines becoming the central hub city for supplies both to Alberta (west) and Manitoba (east) but also to industry north and south. Primary industries were agriculture in the rural south and central region, fishing and forestry in the rural northern region, and mining of various capacities throughout the province depending upon resources available at each site. The depression and drought years of the dirty thirties brought folks beset by agricultural hardships to the cities for a dire hope of employment. Secondary 'make work' industries were on the rise such as manufacturing and construction. Many hotels and bridges were built by this large supply of labour in this time. With the advent of the industrial revolution, after World War II, agricultural output went up with a decrease of labour methods. The supply of workers increased for tertiary employment sector such as transportation, trade, finance and services which were mainly based in urban centres.

== Architecture ==
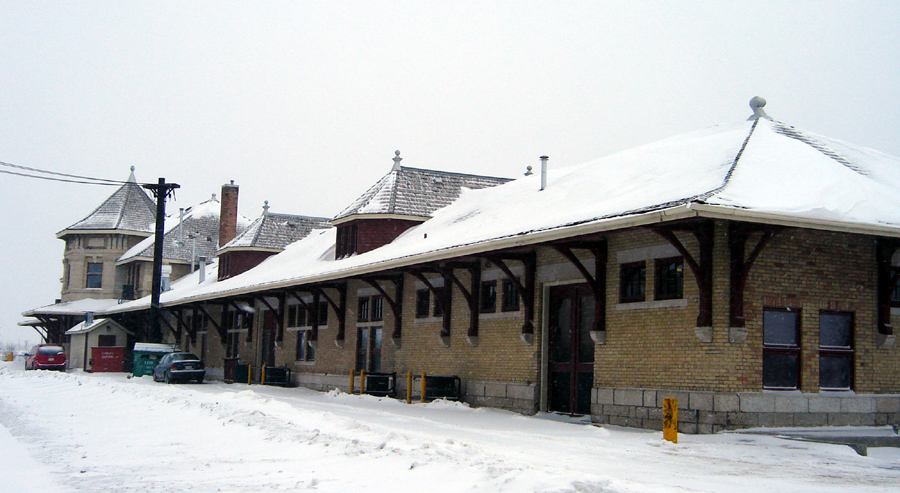
Château style rail stations, Saskatoon

The notable architectural achievements have been preserved as historic and heritage sites. The architecture varies from Anglican Gothic Revival mission churches, Romanesque Revival post offices, Château style rail stations and hotels, Byzantine-style basilica Ukrainian Catholic Cathedrals.

== Film, and television ==
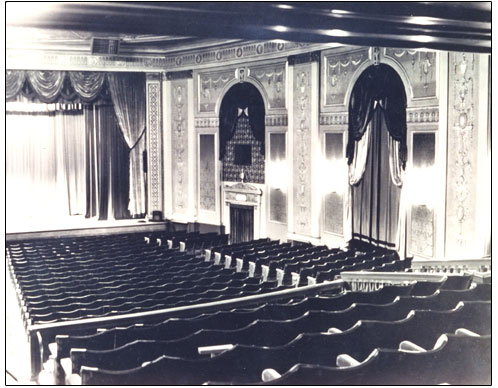
Capitol Theatre, Regina

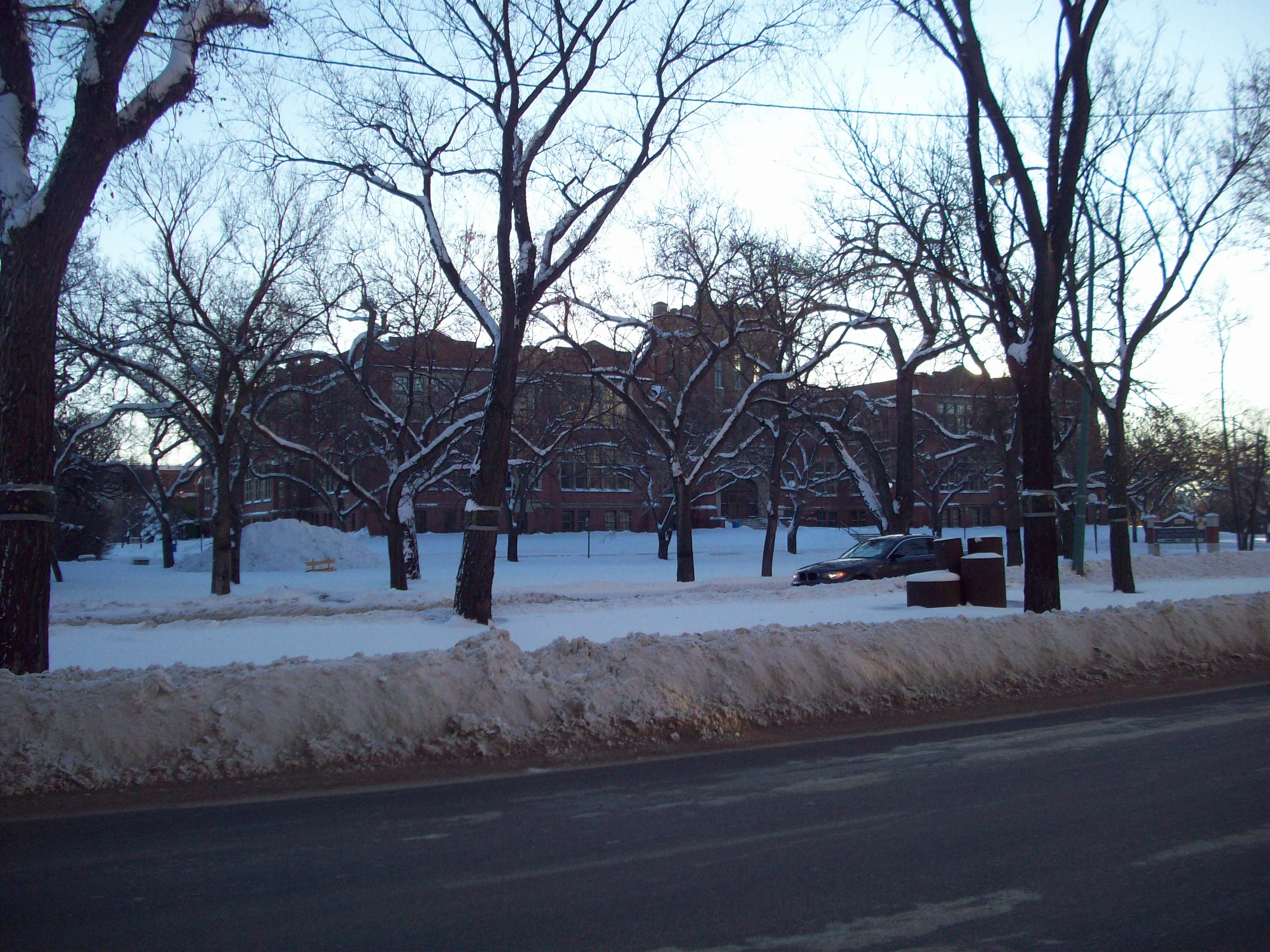
Canada Saskatchewan Sound Stage and Production Studios

By the mid-1950s, there were just over 150 radio broadcast stations operating nationwide across Canada, Canada first received television broadcasts in 1952 at Montreal and Toronto. There are currently nine separate television stations in Saskatchewan.

Film encompasses individual motion pictures, the field of film as an art form, and the motion picture industry. $7.80 admission fees, and 16 motion pictures (mainly made in the United States) were viewed by the average Canadian in 1954.

Saskatchewan residents thereafter developed their own films and the Saskatchewan Film Development Corporation (a production unit of the National Film Board Canada), Saskatchewan Production Studios, as well as the Yorkton Short Film and Video Festival. The Canada Saskatchewan Production Studios located in Regina that has been used for the production of both movies and television programs and are still used today in society.

Film and television productions done at the Canada Saskatchewan Production Studios include:

- Falling Angels (2003)
- Corner Gas (2004–2009)
- Beyond Corner Gas: Tales from Dog River (2005)
- Tideland (2005)
- Sabbatical (2007)
- The Messengers (2007)
- How I Married My High School Crush (2007)
- It's Been a Gas (2009)
- Dolan's Cadillac (2009)
- Walled In (2009)
- InSecurity (2010)

== Theatre ==
The earliest drama selections were of the Christmas school pageants which early on room school house teachers would assemble and present with the assistance of student and parent. The "Socialisti", "Red Devils/Ghosts", "West Country", or the "Coteau Hills Finnish Socialist Society" settled around 1923 in the Steeldale district of Saskatchewan. They would gather in halls and produce local plays.

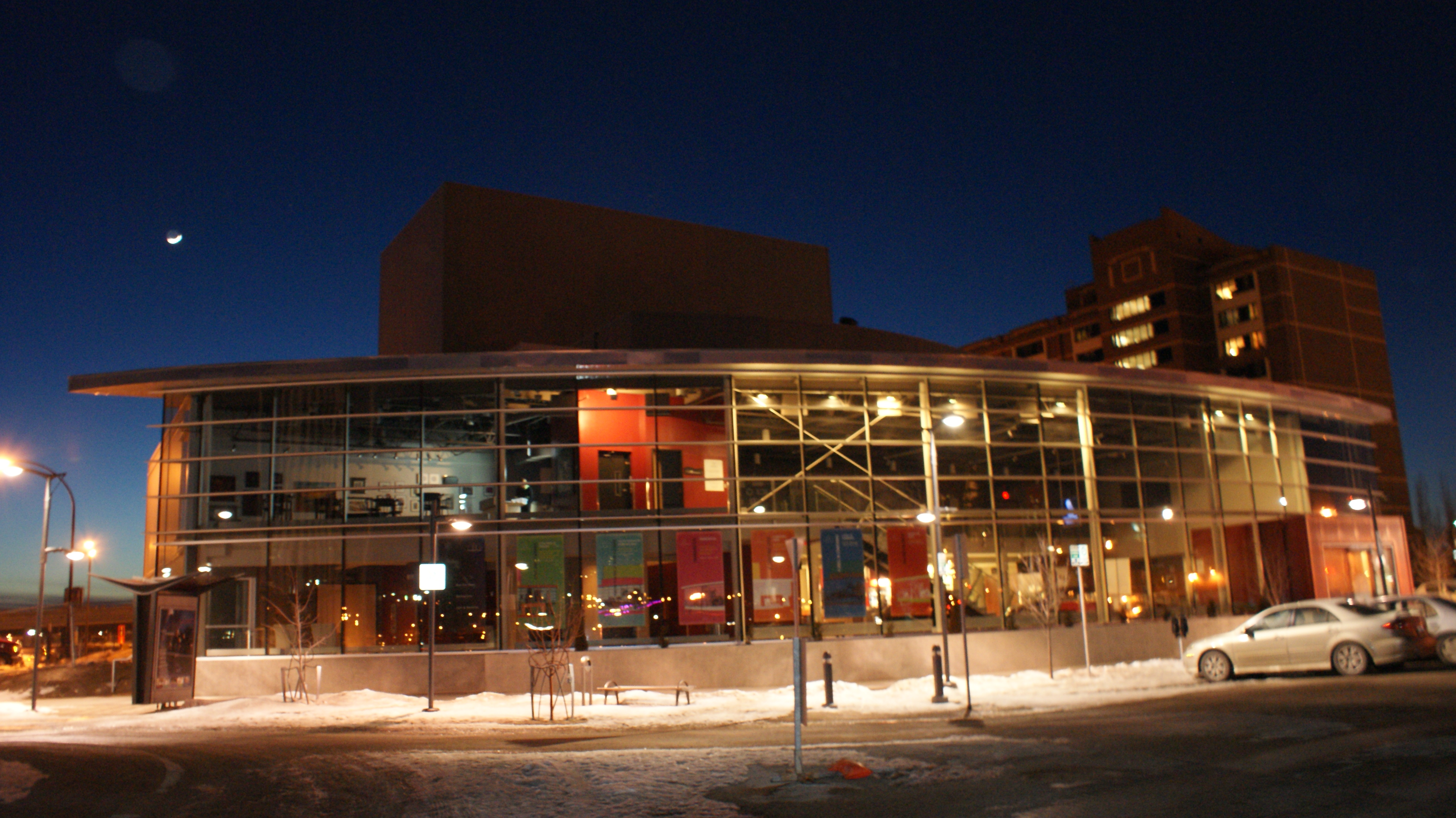
Persephone Theatre during Earth Hour

Several early Saskatchewan communities including Wolseley and Hanley would construct Opera houses to encourage drama production in the early 20th century. The Dominion Drama Festival which showcased a national competition amongst Canadian amateur theatre groups was held in Regina in the mid-1950s.

Thereafter, the Regina Little Theatre and Theatre Saskatchewan formed. Theatre and Saskatoon are synonymous with names such as Henry Woolf actor and artistic director and Bob Hinnitt drama organizer of Castle Theatre Aden Bowman Collegiate. The Persephone Theatre, 25th Street Theatre, Shakespeare on the Saskatchewan, and the Globe Theatre produce professional theatrical shows for the Saskatchewan community today.

== Visual arts ==
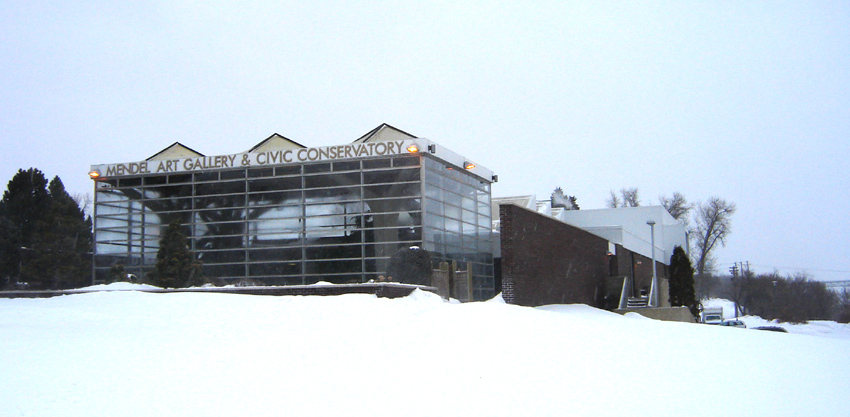
Mendel Art Gallery and Civic Conservatory

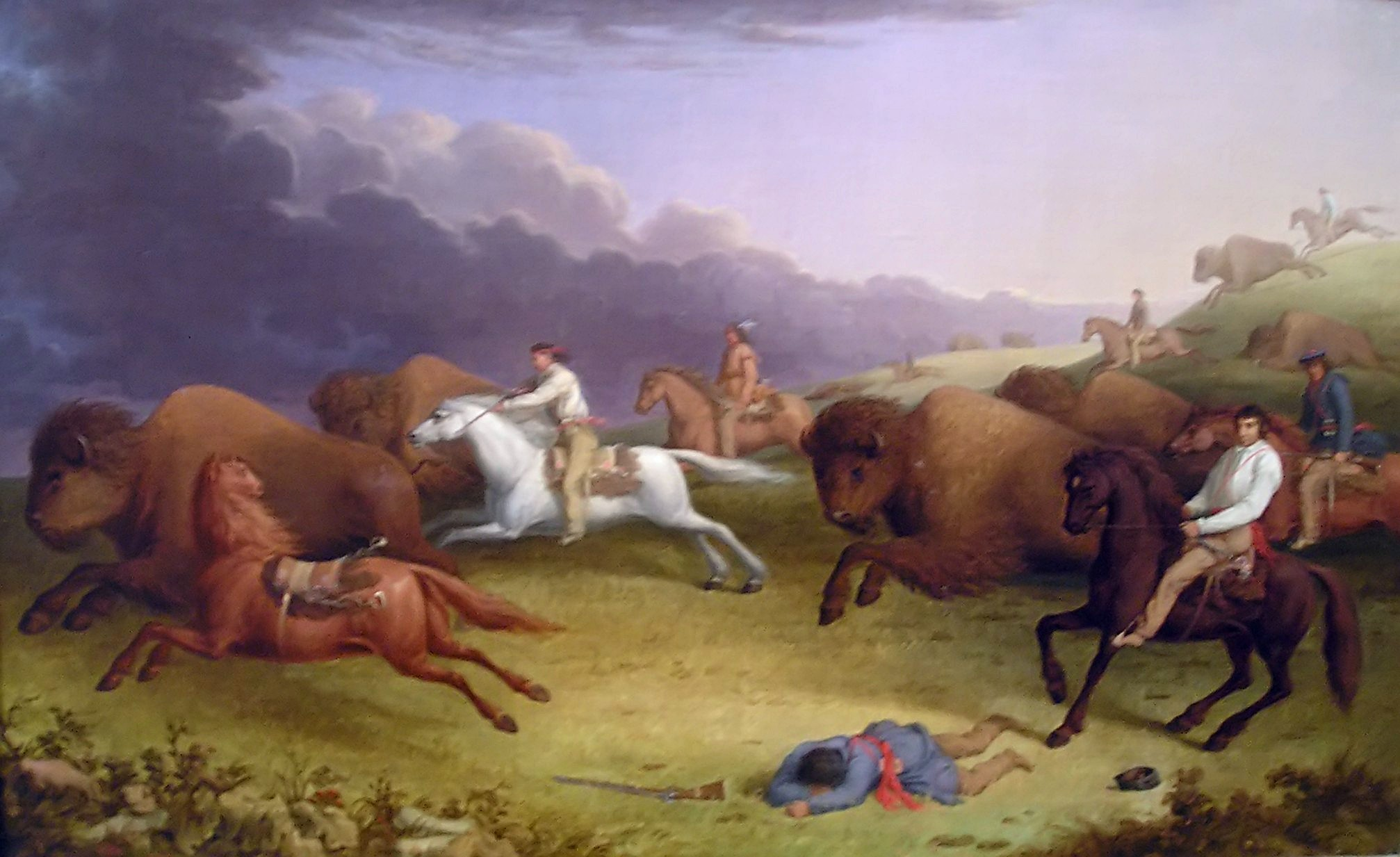
Paul Kane Half-Breeds Running Buffalo

Early explorers and adventurers were enticed to the North West Territories by paintings of Paul Kane who depicted a romantic west of adventure. As early as the 1955 summer season, the Regina College Summer School at Murray Point on Emma Lake reached national prominence. Augustus Kenderdine, Inglis Sheldon-Williams, Illingworth Kerr, James Henderson, Ernest Lindner, Jan Wyers, Dorothy Knowles, Reta Cowley and William Perehudoff are all well known and acclaimed Saskatchewan artists. Kenneth Lochhead, Arthur McKay, Ronald Bloore, Douglas Morton and Ted Godwin became known as the "Regina Five". Joe Fafard, Jack Sures, and Vic Cicansky make ceramics and sculpture their visual art form media. Painters Bob Boyer and David Thauberger, as well as sculptor Bill Epp and the brothers Huang Zhongyang and Huang Zhongru are noteworthy as well.

MacKenzie Art Gallery Regina is the only major currently functioning art gallery in the province known to bring in major shows from other galleries. Saskatoon's now-defunct Mendel Art Gallery Saskatoon ceased operations in 2015 with no known opening date for a new gallery. Prince Albert, North Battleford, Moose Jaw and Yorkton all have public galleries.

== Literature ==
The Saskatchewan Writers Guild, Saskatchewan Playwrights Centre, Thunder Creek Publishing Co-operative formed to support and promote Saskatchewan literary talent.

James Sinclair Ross, W. O. Mitchell, Lorna Crozier, Anne Szumigalski, Candace Savage and Robert Kroetsch, are Saskatchewan's literary artists.

Rev. Charles Gordon (nom de plume, Ralph Connor), Robert Stead, Frederick Philip Grove, Wallace Stegner, R.D. (Bob) Symons, Edward McCourt, Lorna Crozier, Bonnie Burnard, David Carpenter, Don Kerr, Byrna Barclay, Glen Sorestad, Gertrude Story, Maria Campbell, Sharon Butala, Guy Vanderhaege, Brenda Baker, Art Slade, Alice Kuipers, Dave Margoshes, and Chris Fisher have also contributed to the Saskatchewan literary scene. Some Saskatchewan poets include Eli Mandel, Andrew Suknaski, and John Hicks. Famous Saskatchewan novelists would be Ken Mitchell, Gary Hyland, Robert Currie, Geoffrey Ursell and Barbara Sapergia to mention a few.

Tim Lilburn is a Regina poet who has won the Governor General's Literary Award for his novel Kill-site. He was joined by Allen Sapp, painter from the Red Pheasant Reserve who also includes Royal Canadian Academy of Arts and an Officer of the Order of Canada awards. Robert Calder (Saskatoon), Willie: The Life of W. Somerset Maugham, Maggie Siggins (Regina), Revenge of the Land, Anne Szumigalski (Saskatoon Voice), and Guy Vanderhaeghe (Saskatoon), Man Descending and again were all honoured for literary recognition by Premier Roy Romanow during the 1997 Governor General's literary awards ceremonies. There have been other Saskatchewan artists who have been honoured with the Governor General's Literary Awards such as Lorna Crozier (Swift Current), Inventing the Hawk, John Newlove (Regina), The Cave and Lies, Fred Wah (born in Swift Current), Waiting for Saskatchewan, Diana Wieler (Saskatoon), Bad Boy, and Rudy Wiebe, The Temptation of Big Bear and A Discovery of Strangers.

== Media ==
The Saskatchewan Herald, a Battleford newspaper, was the province's first paper and was started in 1878 by Patrick Gammie Laurie.Nicholas Flood Davin founded the Regina Leader in Assiniboia Provisional District, North-West Territories, as early as 1883. Other North-West Territories pre-provincial newspapers (pre-1905) were the Moose Jaw Times, North West Territories Gazette, Prince Albert Times, Qu'Appelle Progress, Qu'Appelle Vidette, Saskatoon Sentinel and The Saskatoon Phenix.

== Dance ==
The First Nation Muskowekwan of Saskatchewan are still renowned for their pow-wow dance, drumming and music. Early pioneer immigrants would enjoy local barn dances with local musical talent who played old-time music and folks enjoyed square dances, polkas, waltzes and ethnic dances.

Saskatchewan Dance Theatre in Saskatoon and Regina Modern Dance Works in Regina are a few of current Saskatchewan dance forms and schools.

== Music ==
All of the First Nations in Saskatchewan align with formal musical styles such as the Regina Symphony Orchestra, Saskatoon Symphony Orchestra, South Saskatchewan Youth Orchestra, Saskatoon Youth Orchestra and the Saskatchewan Music Festival Association. There are also local talented musicians who have become professional on the international stage. A small selection of theseincludes Joni Mitchell, Chris Real, Connie Kaldor, Stu Davis, Don Freed, Colin James, Jack Semple, Brad Johner and the band of Jason Plumb and the Willing. Brenda Baker is a Saskatchewan songwriter, performer as well as author.

== Festivals and events ==
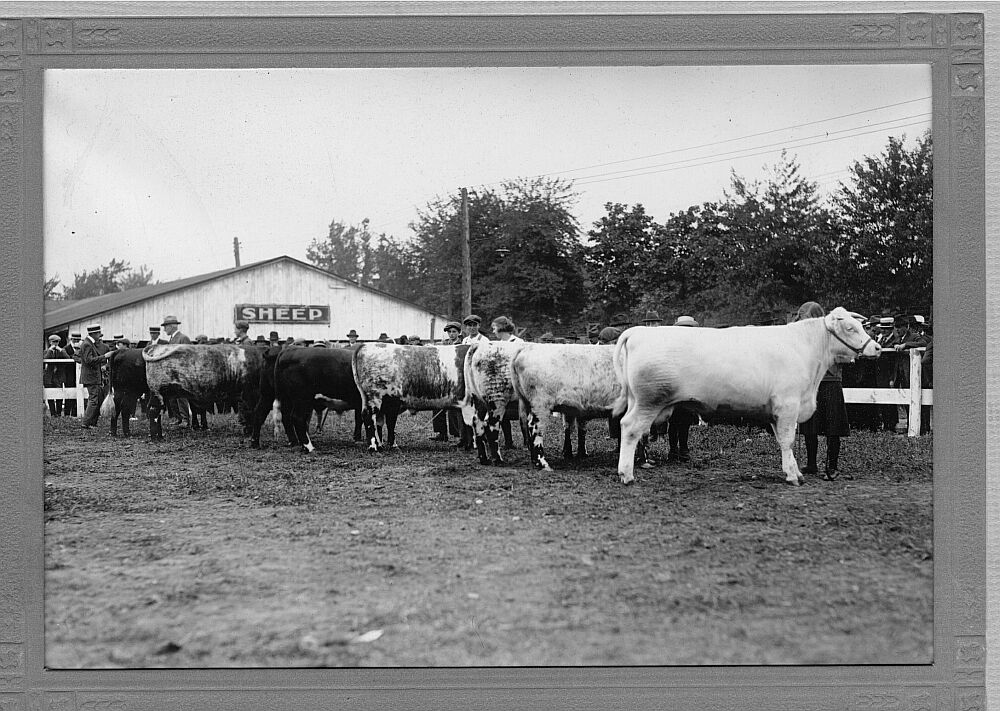
Agricultural show cattle judging

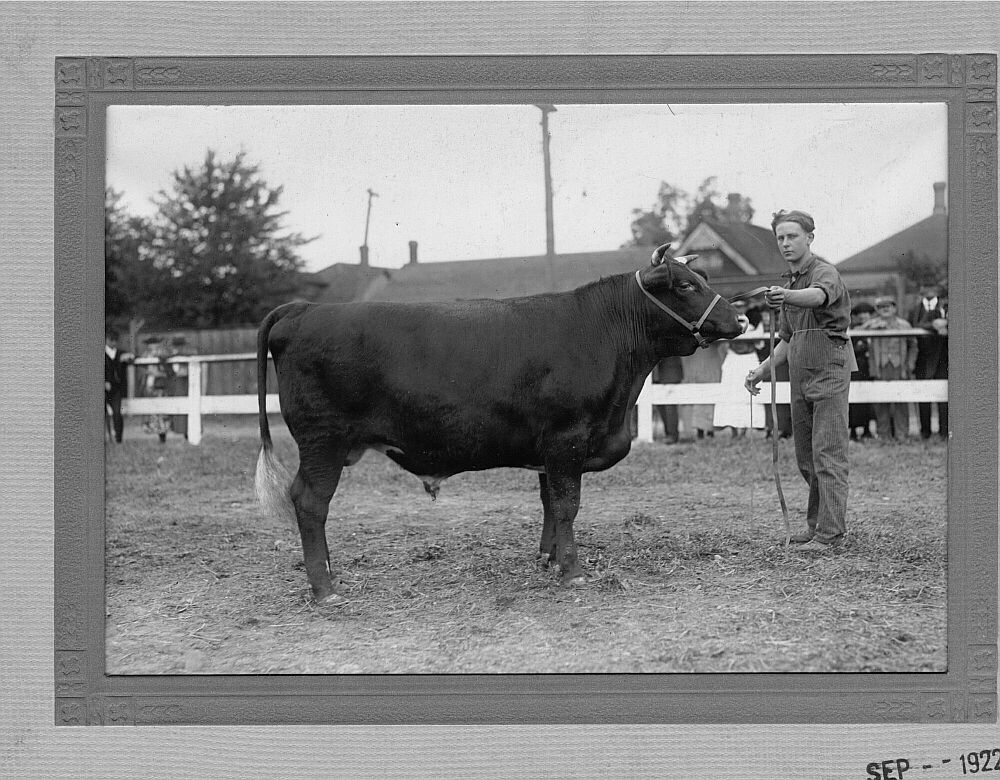
Agricultural show prize bull

Kōnafest snow sculpture, culture in Regina.

Chautauqua movement was an early pioneer traveling "tent show" of arts and entertainment. Agricultural shows are public events showcasing the equipment, animals, sports and recreation associated with the occupations of agriculture and animal husbandry. The largest of these comprise a livestock show (a judged event or display in which breeding stock is exhibited), a trade fair and other competitions and entertainment which have been popular throughout the history of Saskatchewan.

Craven Country Jamboree, The Saskatchewan Festival of Words in Moose Jaw, Saskatoon Fringe Festival, Saskatoon Jazz Festival, Saskatoon Children's Festival, Ness Creek Music Festival, the Regina Folk Festival, the North Battleford Crafts Fair, Regina's Cathedral Village Arts Festival, Northern Saskatchewan Games and Cultural Festival (NSGCF) and the Fort Qu'Appelle Midsummer Arts Festival are just a few of the several hundreds of community festivals held at various times throughout the province.

The Regina Arts Commission is just one of the many organisations formed to support festivals and their creation.

== Food ==
Pemmican and bannock are a few of the historical foods of the Cree First Nation aboriginal peoples. Bannock is easy to prepare and combine with local berries, the dough can be cooked over the open fire suspended on willow stick, and tastes similar to biscuits. Early settlers survived by learning from the First Nations which flora and fauna of the land were edible and how to prepare. Thereafter, the land was tilled, and agricultural practices and trading economies allowed each ethnic group to plant and cultivate the foods necessary for the recipes of their home land. Each ethnic group has brought their unique flavour and recipes to Saskatchewan, and these are celebrated today in Folk Festivals across the province.

== Education ==
=== Colleges and universities ===
The University of Saskatchewan granted bachelor's degrees in fine arts as early as the late 1940s. The University of Regina also exists.

== People ==
- Campbell, Maria - playwright
- Crofford, Joanne - Minister of Culture, Youth and Recreation
- Neatby, Miss Hilda Marion Ada, M.A., Ph.D. Professor of History and Acting Head of the Department, University of Saskatchewan, was appointed to the Royal Commission on National Development in the Arts, Letters, and Sciences, 1949.
- Siggins, Maggie - Canadian journalist
- Spohr, Arnold - Saskatchewan ballet dancer awarded Order of Canada
- Stechishin, Savella - Ukrainian culture
- Wagner, Norman - Saskatchewan born - founded the School of Religion and Culture
- Wettlaufer, Boyd - "the Father of Saskatchewan Archaeology"

== Political economy ==
The largest contribution by politics to the culture of Saskatchewan was the introduction of medicare by Tommy Douglas. Premier Douglas's most notable achievement was the introduction of universal medicare legislation in 1961 to the province of Saskatchewan. In 1964, Justice Hall recommended the nationwide adoption of Saskatchewan's model of public health insurance.

== Prizes and awards ==
Saskatchewan Arts Board formed in 1948 to develop arts and recognition of artists in the province.

== Sports ==
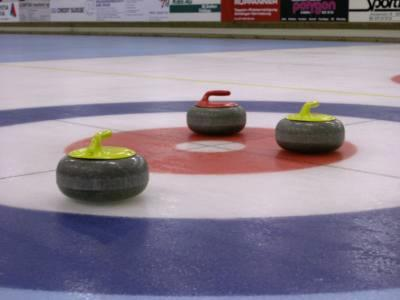
Curling stones

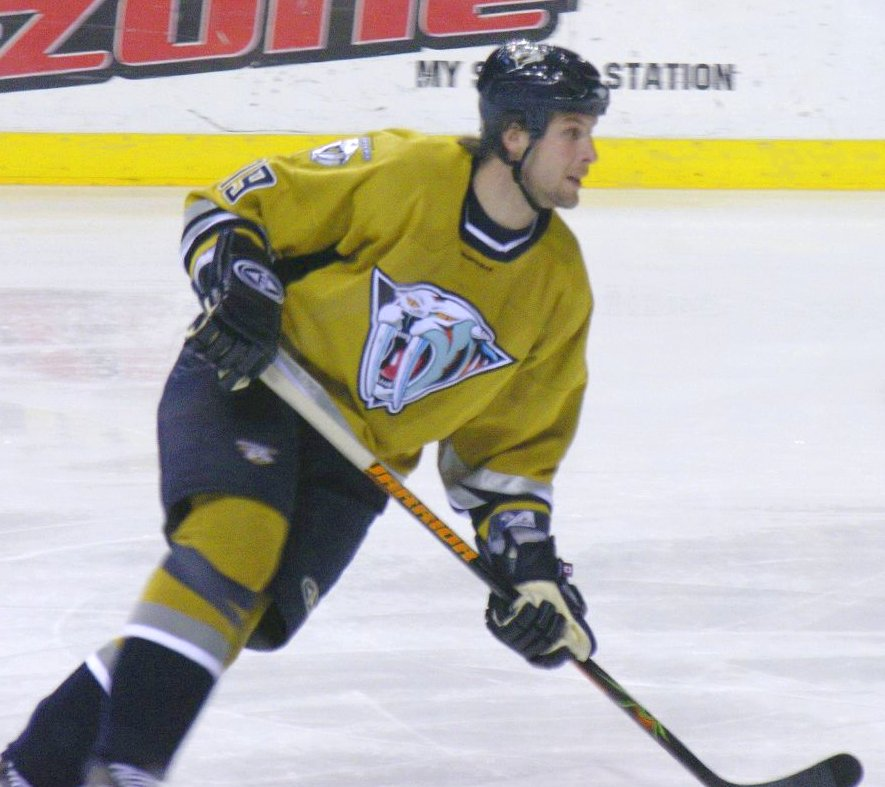
Brendan Witt of Humboldt, Saskatchewan, is a National Hockey League ice hockey player.

Curling is the official sport of Saskatchewan, and was played there before the formation of the province in 1905. Curling ice rinks are the centre of most Saskatchewan communities. The official national summer sport is lacrosse, which was invented by Aboriginal peoples. Ice hockey is the official national winter sport.

Saskatchewan Roughriders is the professional Canadian Football League sports team. The Roughriders are the most popular sports team in the province.

The highest level of hockey in the province are the teams of the Western Hockey League: Moose Jaw Warriors, Prince Albert Raiders, Regina Pats, Saskatoon Blades, and Swift Current Broncos. Many world-class hockey athletes have roots in Saskatchewan, such as Gordie Howe, Bryan Trottier, Clark Gillies, Max Bentley and Wendel Clark amongst several other National Hockey League players.

There exist a few amateur baseball teams in the Western Major Baseball League. Soccer is currently making inroads as a fast-growing sport. Saskatchewan hosts auto racing on the Saskatchewan International Raceway drag racing course, Bridgecity Speedway in Saskatoon, and Kings Park Speedway of Regina, which both feature Thunderstock, and Streetstock racing. Bowling takes several forms in Saskatchewan, including ten-pin and lawn bowling, and five-pin bowling. Golf is a widely enjoyed recreational sport across Saskatchewan and the golf courses feature cross country ski trails in the winter months.

Weyburn hosted the 2004 Saskatchewan Summer Games while Lloydminster hosted the 2008 Saskatchewan Summer Games. Prince Albert hosted the 1993 North American Indigenous Games and Saskatoon hosted the 1971 Canada Winter Games and 1989 Canada Summer Games. There are also university, junior, high school and recreational athletic teams and sports across Saskatchewan.

== See also ==
- Culture in Regina, Saskatchewan
- French Canadians
- List of provincial and territorial nicknames in Canada
- Tourism in Saskatchewan
