= Music of Canada's Prairie Provinces =

The music of the Canadian Prairies includes the music of the Prairie Provinces of Manitoba, Saskatchewan and Alberta.

The city of Winnipeg, Manitoba, is considered a musical center of this region, having produced artists like Neil Young, The Guess Who, Bachman–Turner Overdrive, Crash Test Dummies, and many others. Country music is also popular in all three provinces. The Western Canadian Music Awards have been created to showcase artists from these provinces (along with British Columbia, Yukon Territory, and Northwest Territories).

== Popular music ==
Singer-songwriters from the region include Bob Nolan, Daniel Lavoie, Jann Arden, Ruth B., Tom Cochrane, Burton Cummings, Mac DeMarco, Feist, Carolyn Dawn Johnson, Chantal Kreviazuk, Connie Kaldor, k.d. lang, Tate McRae, Joni Mitchell, Tegan and Sara, Ian Tyson, William Prince, Fred Penner, Colter Wall, and Neil Young.

Rock groups include The Guess Who, Bachman Turner Overdrive, The Stampeders, Loverboy, Nickelback, Crash Test Dummies, The Sheepdogs, The Watchmen, The Weakerthans, and Wide Mouth Mason.

== Classical music ==
Active orchestras include the Calgary Philharmonic Orchestra, Edmonton Symphony Orchestra, Manitoba Chamber Orchestra, Red Deer Symphony, Regina Symphony Orchestra, Saskatoon Symphony Orchestra, Saskatoon Youth Orchestra, and Winnipeg Symphony Orchestra. The CBC Winnipeg Orchestra was active from 1947 until 1984. The region is also home to opera and ballet companies including the notable Royal Winnipeg Ballet, Canada's oldest.

== Jazz ==
Canada's first jazz concert was in 1914 at the Pantages Playhouse Theatre in Winnipeg. Notable jazz musicians from the Prairie provinces include Manitoba's Fraser MacPherson, Lenny Breau and Ed Bickert and Alberta's Eleanor Collins.

== Folk and regional music ==
The Rough Guide to World Music notes that in the Prairie Provinces, "no Ukrainian wedding band is complete without a tsymbaly, and a small local recording industry there continues to produce cassettes of hybrid troista-country bands" (emphasis in original). Ukrainian influences on the music can be seen in modern English-language polka numbers like "Giants of the Prairies" by the Kubasonics.

Folk performers include Oscar Brand, Don Freed, Hart-Rouge, Andrea Menard, and The Wailin' Jennys.
