= Culture in Regina, Saskatchewan =

Regina, Saskatchewan has a rich cultural life in music, theatre and dance, amply supported by the substantial fine arts constituency at the University of Regina, which has a large fine arts department including faculties of music and theatre. At various times this has attracted notable artistic talent: Donald M. Kendrick and Joe Fafard have been particular stars.

== Live theatre ==
Regina Little Theatre, mounting amateur drama performances, "is the oldest continuously producing English-language theatre in western Canada,...[having been] established in the spring of 1926." Its "first public presentation was Officer 666, staged at the Grand Theatre in February 1927. Darke Hall having opened on College Avenue, the Little Theatre operated there and in high schools "until the Regina Performing Arts Centre opened at Angus Street and 4th Avenue in 1989." Productions continued in Darke Hall and local high schools until the Regina Performing Arts Centre opened at Angus Street and 4th Avenue in 1989. The Globe Theatre, was founded in 1966 as "Saskatchewan's first professional theatre since 1927." and since 1981 has operated in the Prince Edward Building (old City Hall, previously the Regina Post Office), a heritage building on 11th Avenue and Scarth Street.

== Music ==
The Regina Symphony Orchestra (Canada's oldest continuously performing orchestra) performs in the Saskatchewan Centre of the Arts (now the Conexus Arts Centre). Concerts and recitals are performed both by local and visiting musicians in the Centre of the Arts and assorted other auditoriums including at the University of Regina and in church buildings.

== Multiculturalism ==
The Regina Multicultural Council (RMC) was established in 1973 as a successor to the Regina Folk Arts Council and the Regina Folk Arts and Cultural Council. Operating as a non-profit organization, the RMC acts as an umbrella organization for over 60 member groups that represent approximately 45,000 people.

The aims of the council are:

1. To further the development and promotion of the cultures and folk arts of all ethno cultural groups;
2. To promote co-operation and mutual understanding among these groups;
3. To promote multiculturalism; and
4. To promote and retain heritage languages and cultural traditions as essential components of multiculturalism.

To meet these aims the RMC organizes and participates in a number of activities, of which the best known is Mosaic.

== Festivals and Events ==
=== Cathedral Village Arts Festival ===
The Cathedral Village Arts Festival is a celebration of the arts. For six days in May, the Cathedral Area is packed with music, theatre, dance, visual arts, literary arts, and crafts. The arts festival ends with a street fair where artisans working in a variety of mediums will show and sell their wares, and performances on stages and buskers entertain. The festival attracts upwards of 35,000 audience members, one of the largest in Saskatchewan.

=== Mosaic ===
Dubbed a "Festival of Cultures", the festival that was first organized in 1967 to celebrate Canada’s centennial which began as a one-day festival. Since 1978, it has been a three-day event held in early June at pavilions throughout Regina. Every pavilion features traditional foods, art and craft displays, and traditional music and dancing.

Each pavilion has ambassadors and youth ambassadors that travel as VIP guests to other pavilions, representing their own ethnicity.

A pre-purchased passport is stamped at the door of each pavilion. It enables the passport holder to visit any pavilion an unlimited number of times and to use the free Mosaic bus transportation to all pavilions.

Mosaic has a number of pavilions representing different ethnic backgrounds. Some of these include: Aboriginal, Austrian, Caribbean, Chilean, Chinese, Ethiopian, Filipino, French, German, Greek, Hungarian, Indian, Irish, Italian, Laos, Polish, Punjabi, Scottish, and Ukrainian.

=== KōnaFest ===
Kōnafest snow sculpture

Pronounced koona-fest — kōna is one of the Cree words for snow — this is an annual winter festival running from mid-February until the first week of March. It is held at various venues throughout the city celebrating all activities that can be enjoyed over the winter. There is an Ice and Fire weekend in Victoria Park that shows off ice and snow sculptures and encourages families to take part in all the activities like field hockey and snow sculpting. The Midwinter Blues Festival portion of Kōnafest features Blues entertainers from all over North America playing at various venues in the city, culminating with the headlining event in the Casino Regina Show Lounge on the final weekend.

=== Craven Country Jamboree ===
The Craven Country Jamboree is an annual summer event in mid-July featuring well-known country music performers in an open-air environment 30 km (19 mi) northwest of Regina. Craven Country Jamboree management stated an attendance average in 2006 of 17,500 visitors daily with a total for the four-day event at 70,000 people. On-site camping adds to the country atmosphere with most sites being sold out from one year to the next.

=== Regina Folk Festival ===
The Regina Folk Festival takes place in mid-August (August 8 to 10th, 2008) in downtown Victoria Park and features diverse artists from all over the world. Workshops, beer gardens and merchants are set up as part of the weekend's activities. The festival also sponsors an ongoing concert series in Regina throughout the year.

=== Regina Dragon Boat Festival ===
Held annually on Labour Day weekend in and around Wascana Lake. The Regina Dragon Boat Festival draws around 20,000 spectators who participate in the racing activities as well as the martial arts demonstrations, the children's fair, Chinese folk dancing, as well as partaking in the beer gardens and the food merchants booths. This multi-cultural community event has over 70 teams participating in the races during its fifteenth year in 2007.

== Visual arts ==
Regina has a rich history in the visual arts. Many artists, such as Bob Boyer, Roger Ing, Joe Fafard and members of the Regina Five, call or have called Regina home. Regina is also home to a number notable public galleries, including the MacKenzie Art Gallery, Dunlop Art Gallery, Neutral Ground and the Art Gallery of Regina (formerly the Rosemont Gallery). Successful commercial galleries have included the Susan Whitney Gallery, the Nouveau Gallery, the Assiniboia Gallery, Mysteria and the McIntyre Gallery.

Also see Subnormality (webcomic).

== See also ==
- Regina Public Library
- Interactive Media and Performance labs at the University of Regina
