= Globe Theatre, Regina =

Theatre in Regina, Saskatchewan

The Globe Theatre Society
- Live is Better!
- Company type: Nonprofit
- Industry: Theatre
- Founded: 1966
- Headquarters: 1801 Scarth Street; Regina, Saskatchewan; S4P 2G9
- Key people: Ken & Sue Kramer (founders)
- Website: www.globetheatrelive.com

Globe Theatre in Regina, Saskatchewan, Canada was founded in 1966 by Ken and Sue Kramer. It was the first professional educational theatre company in Saskatchewan.

== Background ==
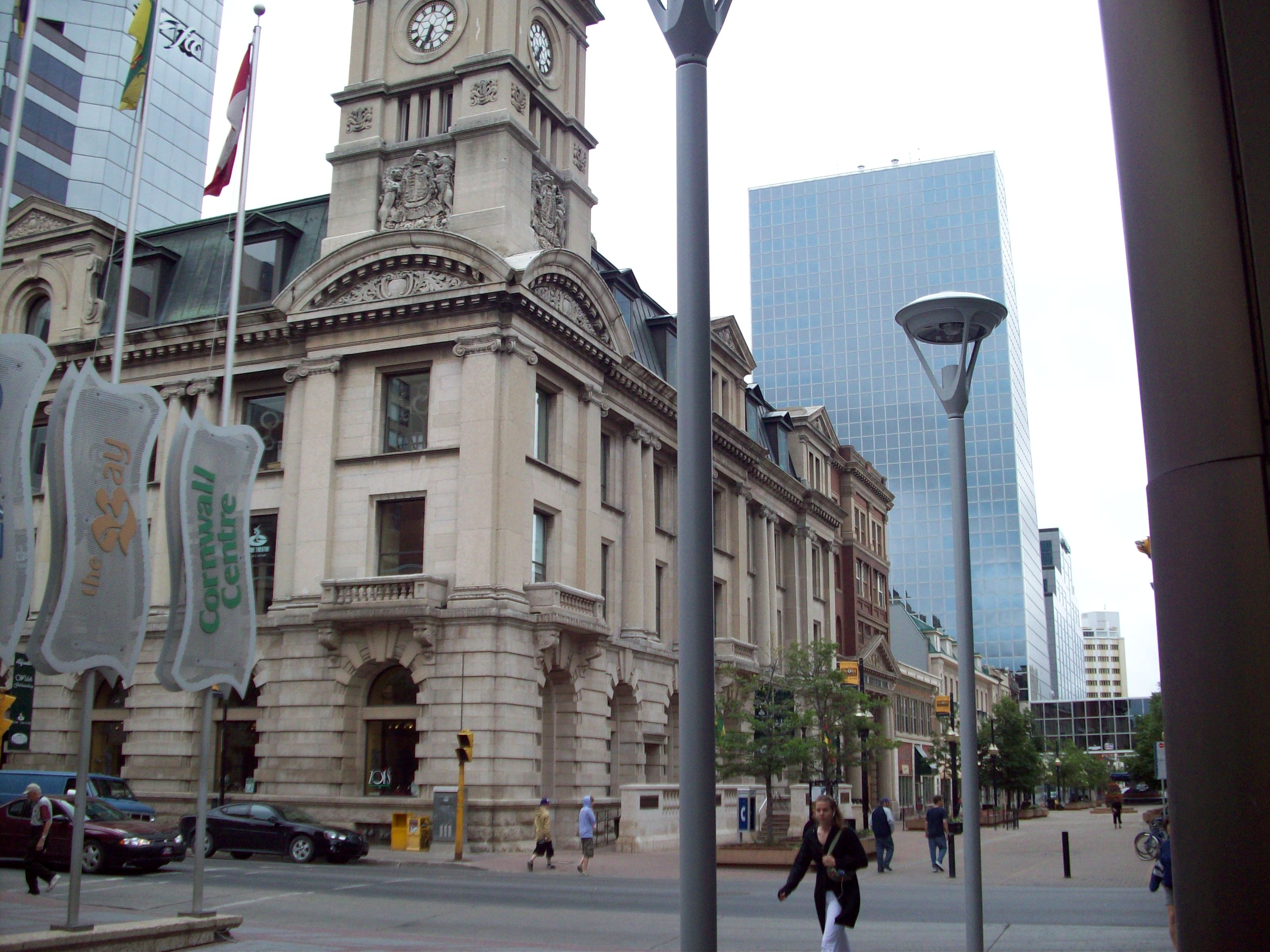
Old Post Office, temporarily a city hall, and Scarth Street Mall.

Founded in 1966 by Ken and Sue Kramer, Globe Theatre was Saskatchewan's first professional theatre company. It was named for Shakespeare's Globe Theatre in London. Globe Theatre is the province's largest performing arts organization and the regional theatre for Regina. The theatre is housed in the Prince Edward Building in downtown Regina, a designated heritage site that was built in 1906 as the Regina Post Office and RCMP headquarters and later became City Hall. The theatre took over the second and third floors of the building in 1981. In 2014, Globe Theatre purchased the Prince Edward Building.

Globe Theatre programs two stages: a 406-seat theatre-in-the-round stage and a 100-seat black box space where the theatre produces emerging artists and work. The theatre produces six productions per year. The Globe Theatre School was launched in 2006.

Globe Theatre underwent extensive renovations between 2020 and 2024, with a performance of a Peter Pan adaptation welcoming audiences back to the main venue on November 27, 2024. While the theatre was under renovation, a number of performances were held at other venues throughout Regina. Remaining work is expected to be complete in time for the theatre's 60 year anniversary in 2026.

== Artistic directors ==
- Ken Kramer (1966–1989)
- Susan Ferley (1989–1998)
- Ruth Smillie (1998–2019)
- Jennifer Brewin (2020–present)

== See also ==
- List of Canadian organizations with royal patronage
- Saskatchewan Royal Connections
- Culture in Regina, Saskatchewan
