= IMP Labs =

Coordinates: 50.4154542°N 104.5900189°W

The Interactive Media and Performance (IMP) Labs are a public space for research and performance at the University of Regina in Regina, Saskatchewan, Canada. directed by Dr. Charity Marsh.

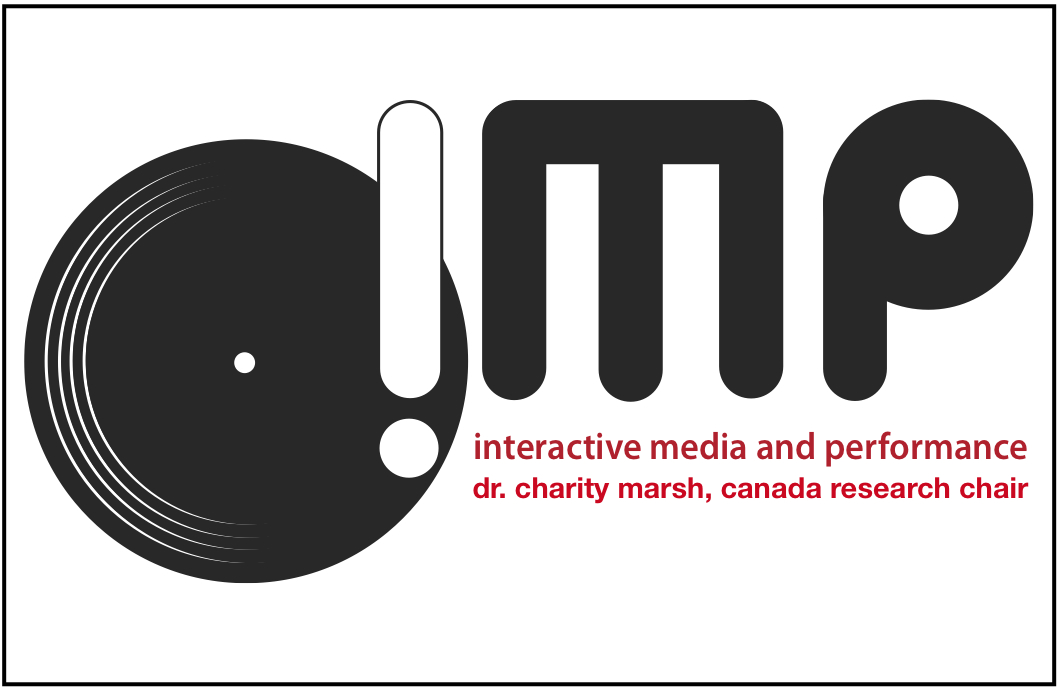
Interactive Media and Performance (IMP) Labs

The IMP Labs are a hub for discussing and creating hip hop and electronic dance music. Its purpose is to bring together local and international scholars, musicians and performers. The lab houses a multimedia, interactive DJ studio and performance/workshop space, beat-making lab, and archival materials. Community engagement is a major drive behind the space, with the goal of make the technology, equipment and expertise accessible not only to researchers and University students but to the public at large.

The labs are a primary site for interdisciplinary research and collaborative projects across the University of Regina and among wider communities of interest, particularly in Western and Northern Canada. The labs house the following:

- A multi-media DJ interactive studio and performance/workshop space
- An Ethnomusicology Fieldwork Lab
- A Beat-making-Electronic Music Studio
- Archival materials
- Research offices for post-doctoral fellows and graduate students

The labs are the focal point for the ongoing projects of the CRC. Another component of the CRC research programme is in the areas of new media, Social Network Sites (SNS) such as Facebook and MySpace, video games, and on-line interactive communities, including fan sites.

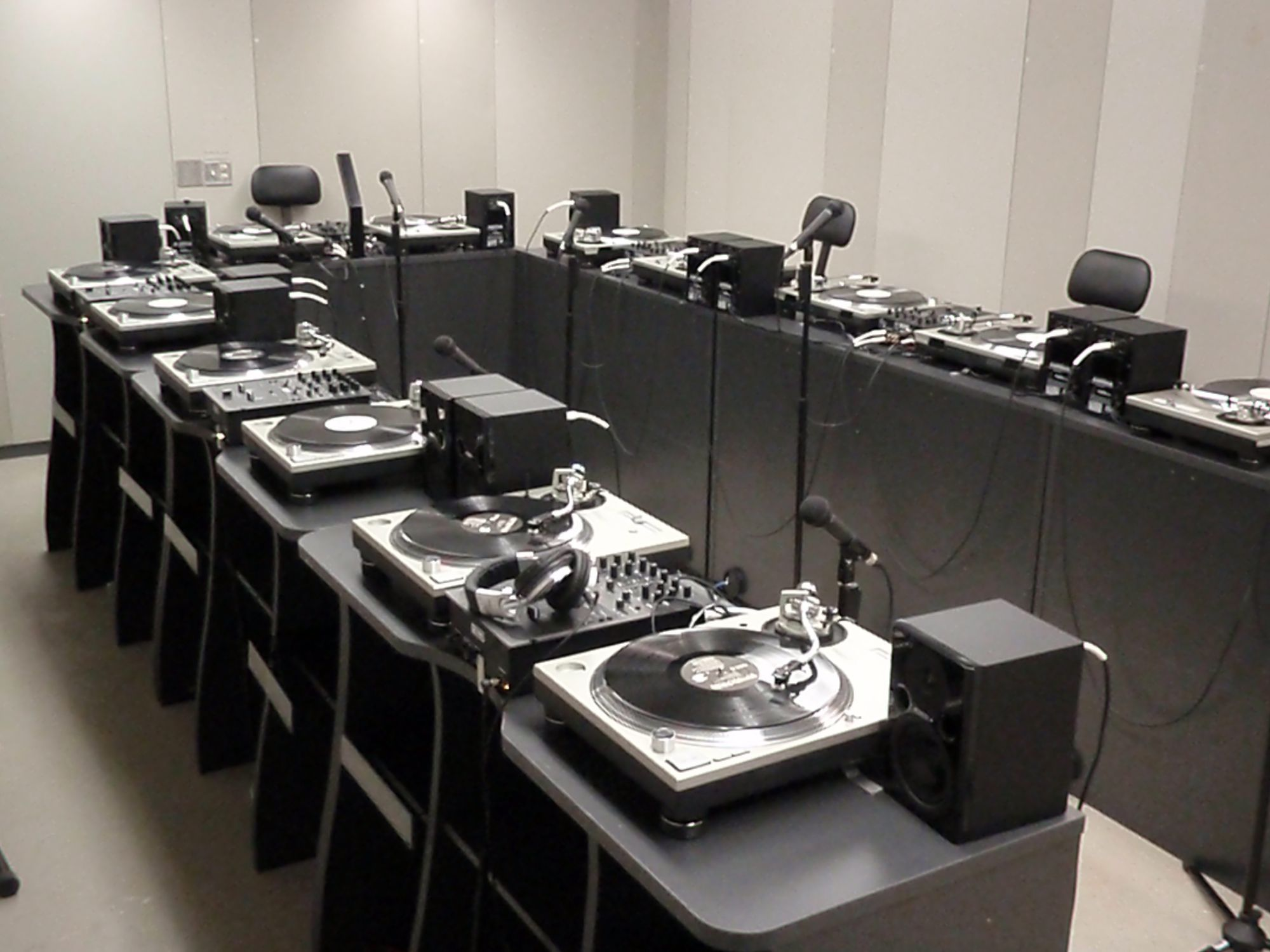
DJ Multi-Media Workshop and Performance Studio "DJ pod"
