= Saskatoon Symphony Orchestra =

Canadian orchestra formed 1927

- Short name: SSO
- Founded: 1927
- Concert hall: TCU Place
- Principal conductor: Eric Paetkau
- Website: saskatoonsymphony.org

The Saskatoon Symphony Orchestra (SSO) is a professional orchestra based in Saskatoon, Saskatchewan, administered by the non-profit Saskatoon Symphony Society. The orchestra was founded in 1927 as an amateur orchestra, but today has 10 core members and up to 50 sessional musicians.

University of Saskatchewan Department of Music, University Chorus, Greystone Singers, Saskatoon Chamber Singers, Saskatoon Children's Choir, Regina Symphony Orchestra, Saskatoon Youth Orchestra, and the Amati Quartet have all produced concerts with the SSO. The Canadian Opera Company ensemble, National Ballet, and the Royal Winnipeg Ballet have all performed with accompaniment provided by the SSO. The SSO celebrated its 75th anniversary in the Fall of 2004.

== History ==
In 1903, William Preston, who was also involved with the Saskatoon Oratorio Society, began an amateur orchestra in Saskatoon. Fredrick William Musselwhite conducted the Saskatoon orchestra as early as 1905 with John Jackson as concertmaster. In 1913, John Jackson began a Saskatoon orchestra, followed by a temporary orchestra established in 1924 by Allan Clifton. In 1931 the current orchestra was established, under the direction of Arthur Collingwood, the Professor of Music at the University of Saskatchewan.

The SSO offers students grants and hosted a national cello competition in 1990. Dwaine Nelson was responsible for the development of a full-time core of musicians, initially with a size of six, but later expanded to the present-day ten members. In the summer of 2014, the SSO announced that Maestro Victor Sawa would move into the position of Conductor Emeritus at the end of the 84th season. In March 2015, the SSO announced Eric Paetkau as the 16th Music Director of the orchestra.

== Funding ==
The SSO received major funding from the Carnegie Institute in 1931. The Canada Council, the Saskatchewan Arts Board, and the City of Saskatoon have all provided sponsorship of the SSO through the years. In the spring, the symphony holds a Saskatoon Symphony Book & Music Sale to raise funds for the orchestra.

== Music directors, concertmasters, and current artistic leadership ==
The conductors of the SSO, a position that includes artistic direction, have been:

- Arthur Collingwood, (1931–1947)
- Professor J.R. Macrae (1947–1950)
- Victor Kviesis (1950–1956)
- Professor Murray Adaskin (1957–1960)
- Alexander Reisman (1960–1963)
- Professor David Kaplan (1963–1969, 1970–1971)
- Franz Zeidler (1969–1970)
- Dwaine Nelson (1971–1976)
- Ruben Gurevich (1976–82)
- David Gray (1982–1984)
- Professor Daniel Swift (1984–1991)
- Dennis Simons (1993–1997)
- Earl Stafford (1997–2002)
- Douglas Sanford (2002–2008)
- Earl Stafford (2008–2010) – interim artistic director
- Victor Sawa (2010–2015)
- Eric Paetkau (2015–2022)

== Performing venue ==
Currently performances are held at TCU Place. Historically, Bessborough Hotel's ballroom, the Capitol Theatre, and Convocation Hall at the University of Saskatchewan have provided venues for the SSO performances.

== Concert series ==
The SSO's annual programming includes concerts presented through multiple series and specials.

The Masters Series features the orchestra in performance of standard orchestral repertoire, concertos, symphonies, from all eras of music including living composers and Canadian repertoire. Guest artists have included James Ehnes, Angela Cheng, Jane Coop, Maureen Forrester, Jon Vickers, Angela Hewitt, and Pinchas Zukerman.

The Pops Series presents concerts featuring pop music from jazz to rock; performances have featured the music of The Beatles, Pink Floyd, Queen, Duke Ellington, Frank Sinatra, and Led Zeppelin.

Symphony Chamber Players began in 1985. Great Music for Kids introduced children to orchestral music in 1984. 1993 saw the inauguration of Music for a Sunday Afternoon, the series is now known as Sunday Chamber Series.

== Canadian Federation of Musicians ==
Saskatoon Symphony Orchestra is a member of Canadian Federation of Musicians. Canadian Federation of Musicians purports to help musicians who may need assistance with any number of issues related to the recording and performing of their craft. Services range from immigration, media recordings, symphonic and theatrical matters, touring, freelance musicians and membership services, contract negotiations and administration and royalty streams.

== Recordings ==
In 2005, the SSO, under the direction of Earl Stafford, recorded a program of music written by Neil Currie. The resulting album, entitled Passionscape, was nominated for Outstanding Classical Composition at the 2006 Western Canada Music Awards. The album includes pieces with solo artists Alain Trudel and Allen Harrington. The SSO also records regularly for CBC Radio.

== See also ==
- Music of Canada's Prairie Provinces
- Saskatoon Youth Orchestra
