= Canadian Prairies =

Region of Western Canada

- National region
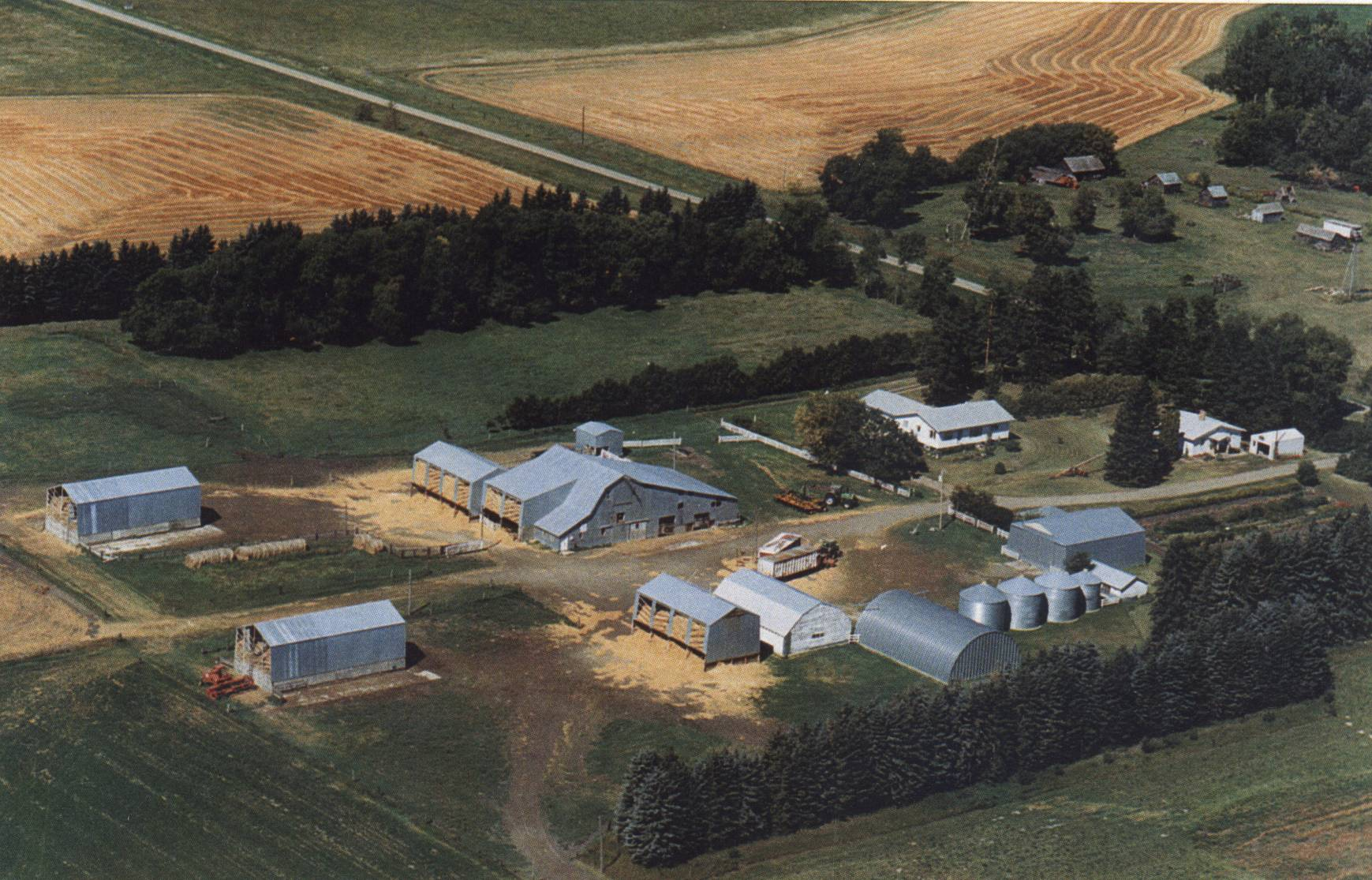
- Farm on the prairies near Hartney, Manitoba

- Map of the Prairie provinces
- Location: Alberta; Saskatchewan; Manitoba

Area
  - Total: 1,960,681 km^{2} (757,023 sq mi)
- Highest elevation: 3,747 m (12,293 ft)
- Population: 6,737,293

The Canadian Prairies (often referred to as simply the Prairies federally) is a region in Western Canada. It includes the Canadian portion of the Great Plains and the Prairie provinces, Alberta, Saskatchewan, and Manitoba. These provinces are partially covered by grasslands, plains, and lowlands, mostly in the southern regions. The northernmost reaches of the Canadian Prairies are less dense in population, marked by forests and more variable topography. If the region is defined to include areas only covered by prairie land, the corresponding region is known as the Interior Plains. Physical or ecological aspects of the Canadian Prairies extend to northeastern British Columbia, but that area is not included in the political use of the term.

The prairies in Canada are a biome of temperate grassland and shrubland within the prairie ecoregion of Canada. This ecoregion consists of northern mixed grasslands in Alberta, Saskatchewan, and southern Manitoba, as well as northern short grasslands in southeastern Alberta and southwestern Saskatchewan. The Prairies Ecozone of Canada includes the northern tall grasslands in southern Manitoba and Aspen parkland, which covers central Alberta, central Saskatchewan, and southern Manitoba. The Prairie starts from north of Edmonton and it covers the three provinces in a southward-slanting line east to the Manitoba–Minnesota border. Alberta has the most land classified as prairie, while Manitoba has the least, as the boreal forest begins more southerly in Manitoba than in Alberta.

== Main climates ==
The core climate of the Canadian prairie region is defined as a semi-arid climate and is often based upon the Köppen climate classification system. This type of classification encompasses five main climate types, with several categoric subtypes based on the precipitation pattern of the region. The majority of the prairie provinces experience snowy, fully humid continental climates with cool summers (known as Group D), and subarctic climate, also known as class Dfc on the Köppen climate scale. The southernmost regions of the prairies tend to experience fully humid continental climates with warm summers, Dfb. In parts of southwestern Saskatchewan and southern Alberta in Palliser's Triangle, the climate is drier with greater evapotranspiration, resulting in BSk, cold semi-arid climates.

Precipitation events in the Canadian Prairies are important to study as these locations make up 80% of the country's agricultural production. On average, 454 mm (18 in) of precipitation falls on the prairies each year. Out of the three prairie provinces, Saskatchewan obtains the least amount of precipitation annually (395 mm [16 in]), with Manitoba receiving the most at 486 mm (19 in). Most rainfall typically happens in the summer months such as June and July. With the high humidity of the prairies, tornadoes are likely to occur—marking central Saskatchewan, Alberta and southern Manitoba as high probability areas. Approximately 72% of tornadoes in Canada are seen across the prairies due to the capability of summer thunderstorm precipitation to mechanically mix with the air adjacent to the relatively flat surface of the region.

Average climates for selected cities in the Canadian Prairies (Canadian Climate Normals 1991-2020)
City	Province	July	January	Annual precipitation	Plant hardiness zone (1981-2010)	Average growing season (in days)
Lethbridge	AB	26 / 11 °C (79 / 52 °F)	0 / −12 °C (32 / 10 °F)	373 mm (15 in)	4b	118
Calgary	AB	24 / 10 °C (75 / 50 °F)	−2 / −14 °C (28 / 7 °F)	445 mm (18 in)	4a	119
Medicine Hat	AB	28 / 13 °C (82 / 55 °F)	−3 / −14 °C (27 / 7 °F)	331 mm (13 in)	4b	135
Edmonton	AB	24 / 13 °C (75 / 55 °F)	−6 / −15 °C (21 / 5 °F)	423 mm (17 in)	4a	141
Grande Prairie	AB	23 / 10 °C (73 / 50 °F)	−8 / −19 °C (18 / −2 °F)	435 mm (17 in)	3b	111
Regina	SK	26 / 12 °C (79 / 54 °F)	−9 / −20 °C (16 / −4 °F)	390 mm (15 in)	3b	114
Saskatoon	SK	25 / 12 °C (77 / 54 °F)	−10 / −21 °C (14 / −6 °F)	357 mm (14 in)	3b	117
Prince Albert	SK	24 / 12 °C (75 / 54 °F)	−12 / −23 °C (10 / −9 °F)	432 mm (17 in)	3a	113
Brandon	MB	25 / 12 °C (77 / 54 °F)	−11 / −22 °C (12 / −8 °F)	489 mm (19 in)	3b	122
Winnipeg	MB	26 / 13 °C (79 / 55 °F)	−11 / −21 °C (12 / −6 °F)	519 mm (20 in)	4a	122

== Physical geography ==
Although the Prairie Provinces region is named for the prairies located within Alberta, Saskatchewan and Manitoba, the physical geography of the three provinces is quite diverse, consisting of portions of the Canadian Shield, the Western Cordillera and the Canadian Interior Plains. The plains comprise both prairies and boreal plains forests while, with the exception of freshwater along the Hudson Bay, the shield is predominantly forested.

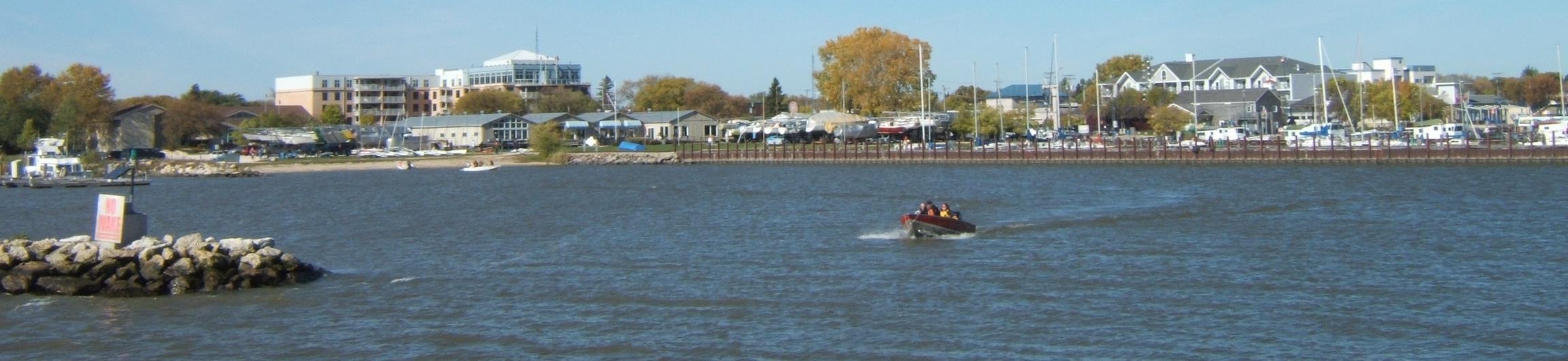
Gimli, Manitoba, is on Lake Winnipeg, a very large fresh water lake in the eastern prairies.

=== Prairies ===
Three main grassland types occur in the Canadian Prairies: tallgrass prairie, mixed grass prairie, and fescue prairie (or using the WWF terminology, northern tall grasslands, northern mixed grasslands, and northern short grasslands). Each has a unique geographic distribution and characteristic mix of plant species. All but a fraction of 1% of the tallgrass prairie has been converted to cropland. What remains occurs on the 6,000 km^{2} (2,300 sq mi) plain centred in the Red River Valley in Manitoba. Mixed prairie is more common and is part of the dry interior plains that extend from Canada south to the U.S. state of Texas.

The northern short grasslands (WWF terminology) shown here on a map of North America in green, is a type of true prairie (grassland) that occurs in the southern parts of the Prairie Provinces.

More than half of the remaining native grassland in the Canadian Prairies is mixed. Though widespread in southern Saskatchewan and southeastern Alberta, because of extensive cattle grazing, it is estimated that only 24% of the original mixed prairie grassland remains. Fescue prairie occurs in the moister regions, occupying the northern extent of the prairies in central and southwestern Alberta and west-central Saskatchewan.

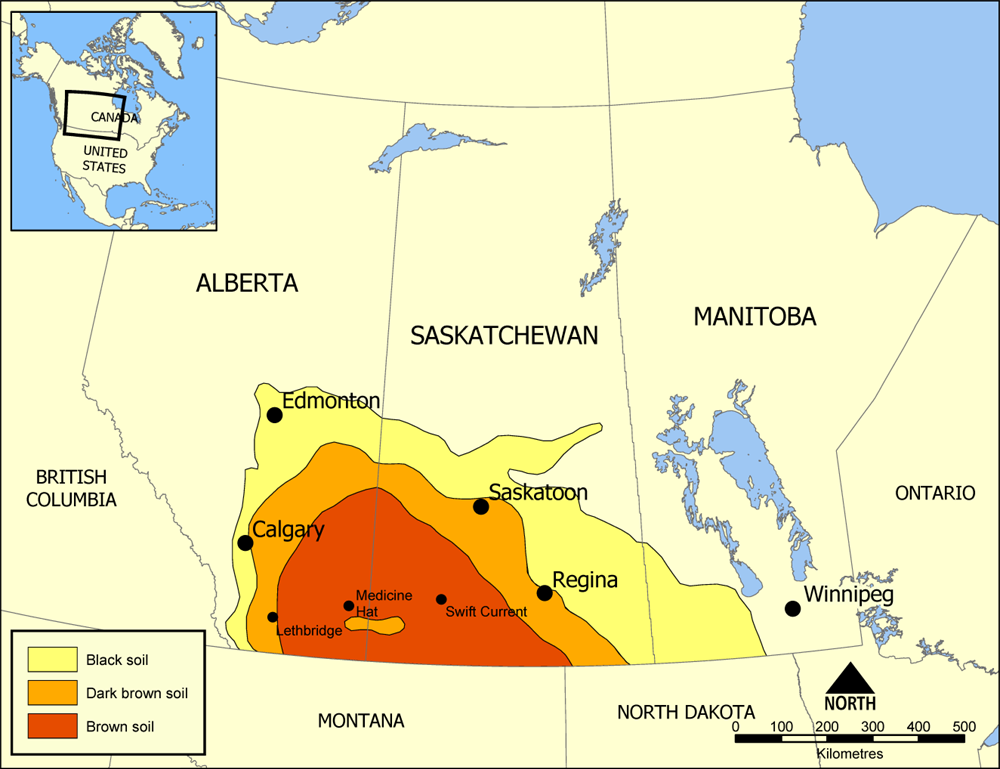
Palliser's Triangle, delineating prairie soil types in the Prairie provinces

The southwestern Canadian Prairies, supporting brown and black soil types, are semi-arid and highly prone to frequent and severe droughts.

The zones around the cities of Regina and immediately east of Calgary are also very dry. Most heavy precipitation quickly dissipates by the time it passes Cheadle on its way heading east. In an average year, southern Saskatchewan receives between 30–51 cm (12–20 in) of precipitation, with the majority falling between April and June. Frost from October to April (and sometimes even early May) limits the growing season for certain crops.

The eastern section of the Canadian Prairies in Manitoba is well watered with several large lakes such as Lake Winnipeg and several large rivers. The area also gets reasonable amounts of precipitation. The middle sections of Alberta and Saskatchewan are also wetter than the south and have better farmland, despite having a shorter frost-free season. The areas around Edmonton and Saskatoon are especially notable as good farmland. Both lie in the northern area of the Palliser's Triangle, and are within aspen parkland a transitional prairie ecozone.

Further north, the area becomes too cold for most agriculture besides wild rice operations and sheep raising, and it is dominated by boreal forest. The Peace Region in northwestern Alberta is an exception, however. It lies north of the 55th parallel and is warm and dry enough to support extensive farming. Aspen parkland covers the area; The long daylight hours in this region during the summer are an asset despite having an even shorter growing season than central Alberta. In fact, agriculture plays a major economic role in the Peace Region. 16 km^{2} (6.2 sq mi)

== Demographics ==
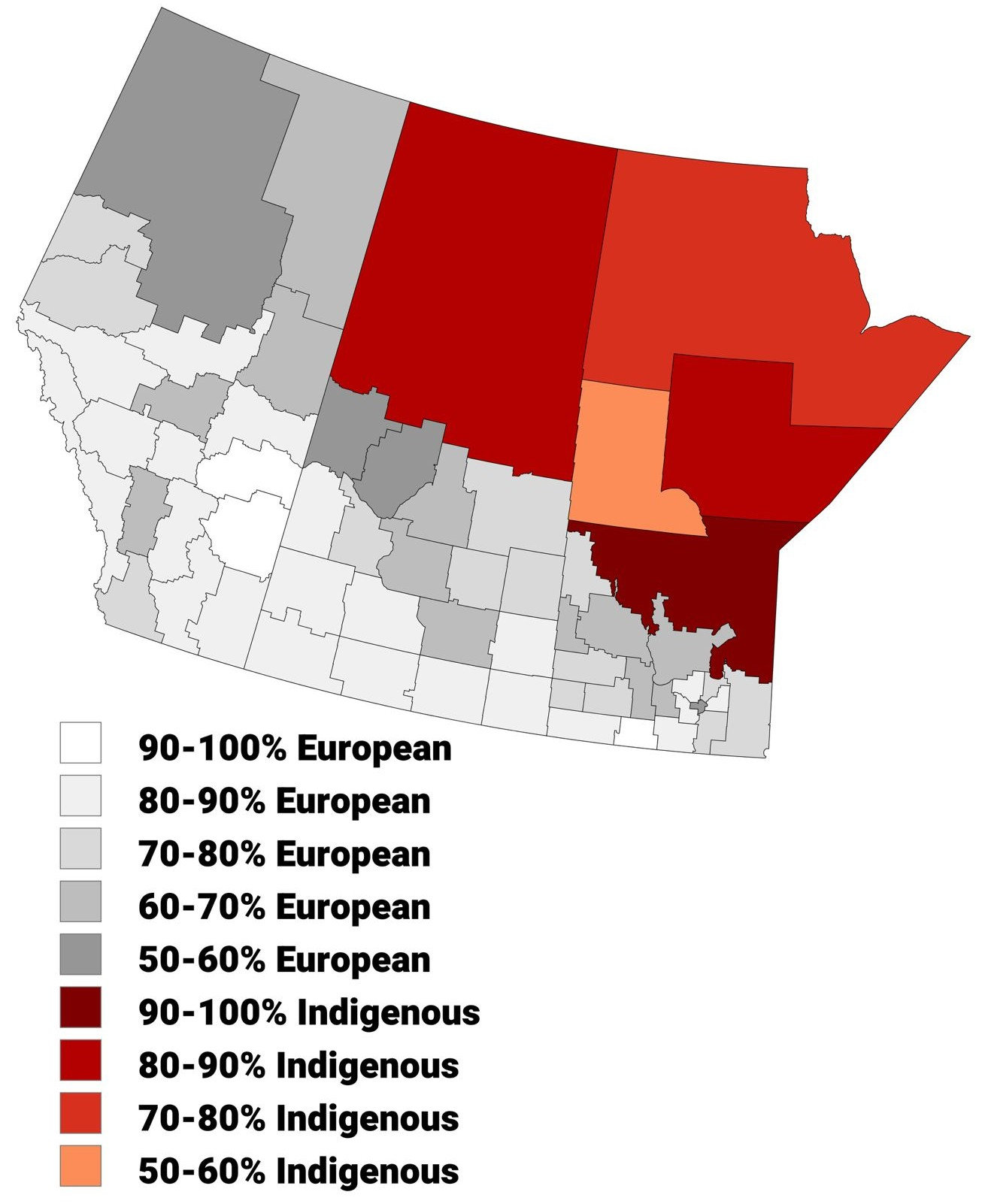
Largest panethnic groups in the Prairies by percentage of total population by census division, 2021 census

Census metropolitan areas in the Canadian Prairies
Rank	Census metropolitan area	Province	Population				Area (land)	
Rank	Census metropolitan area	Province	(2021)	(2016)	Change	Density	km2	sq mi
1	Calgary	Alberta	1,481,806	1,392,609	+6.41%	290.6	5,098.68	1,968.61
2	Edmonton	Alberta	1,418,118	1,321,441	+7.32%	150.6	9,416.19	3,635.61
3	Winnipeg	Manitoba	834,678	783,099	+6.59%	157.9	5,285.46	2,040.73
4	Saskatoon	Saskatchewan	317,480	295,095	+7.59%	54.1	5,864.48	2,264.29
5	Regina	Saskatchewan	249,217	236,695	+5.29%	57.6	4,323.66	1,669.37
6	Lethbridge	Alberta	123,847	117,394	+5.50%	41.9	2,958.96	1,142.46
7	Red Deer	Alberta	100,844	100,418	+0.42%	966.5	104.34	40.29

In the 2021 Canadian census, the Canadian prairie provinces had a population of 6,737,293 consisting of 4,262,635 in Alberta, 1,342,153 in Manitoba, and 1,132,505 in Saskatchewan, up 4.6% from 6,443,892 in 2016. The three provinces have a combined area of 1,960,681 km^{2} (757,023 sq mi) (1,787,543 km^{2} (690,174 sq mi) land and 173,138 km (107,583 mi) freshwater) consisting of 661,848 km^{2} (255,541 sq mi) in Alberta, 647,797 km^{2} (250,116 sq mi) in Manitoba, and 651,036 km^{2} (251,366 sq mi) in Saskatchewan.

=== Growth ===
Some of the prairie region of Canada has seen rapid growth from a boom in oil production since the mid-20th century.

According to StatsCanada, the prairie provinces had a population of 6,443,892 in 2016. In 2021, the population had grown by 4.6% to 6,737,293

== Economy ==
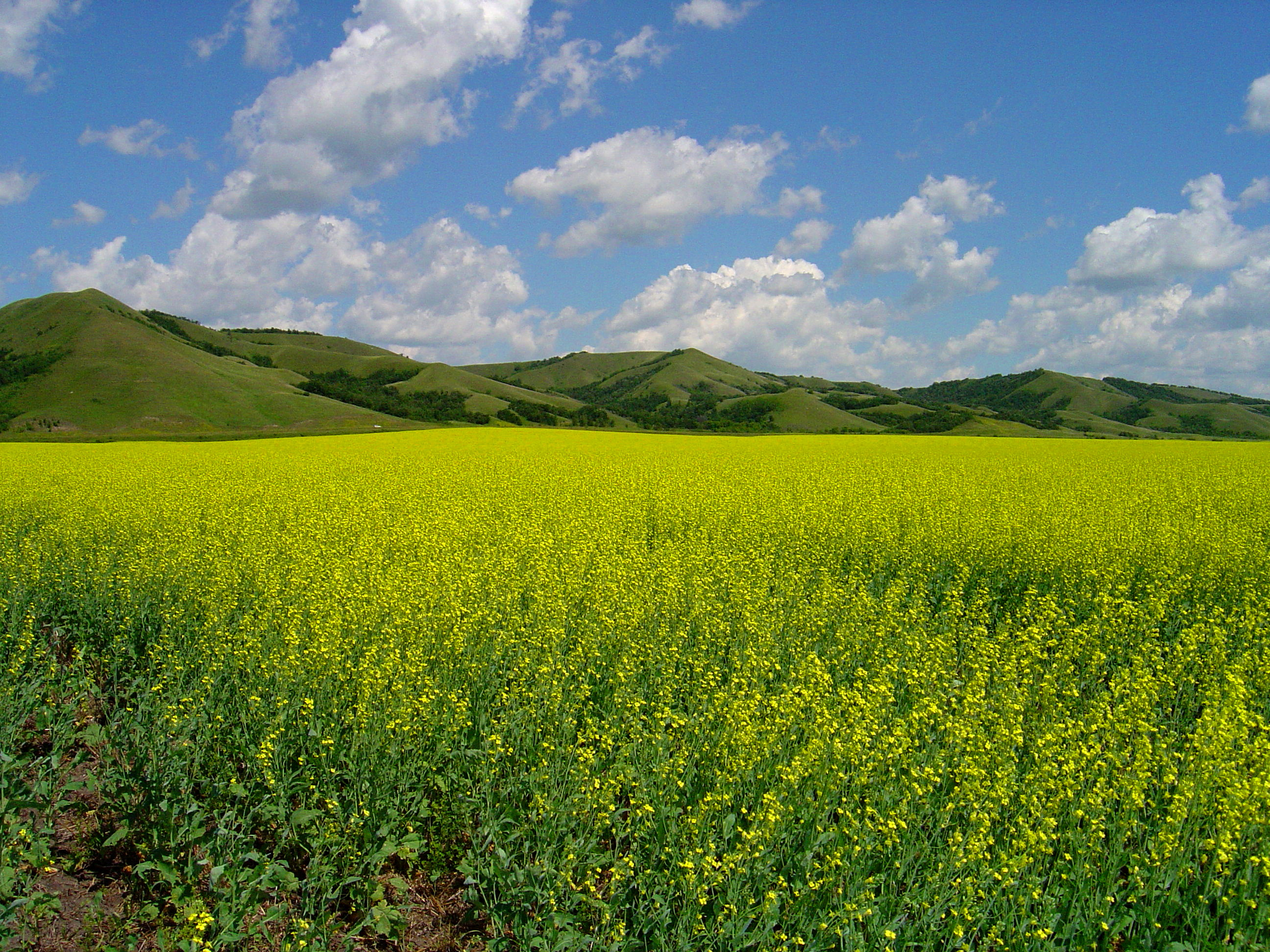
A canola field in the Qu'Appelle Valley in southern Saskatchewan.

In the mid 20th century, the economy of the prairies exploded, due to the oil boom, and introduced a growth of jobs. The primary industries are agriculture and services. Agriculture consisting of livestock (cattle and sheep), cultivating crops (oats, canola, wheat, barley), and production of oil.

=== Oil ===
Due to the production of oil, the service industry expanded in order to provide for the employees of the oil companies extracting the oil. In the 1950s-1970s, the explosion of oil production increased the worth of Alberta, allowing it to become the "nation's richest province" and Canada one of the top petroleum exporters in the world. Edmonton and Calgary drew in a larger population with the increase in jobs in the energy industry, causing the jobs supporting this industry to grow as well. It was through the steady economic growth that followed this explosion that the prairies region began to switch from an agriculture-based job sector to one with services included..

In 2014, the global market for oil fell and led to a recession, impacting the economy dramatically. Alberta still has an oil-dominant economy even as the traditional oil wells dry up; there are oil sands further north (i.e. the Athabasca oil sands near Fort McMurray) that continue to provide jobs to extract, drill and refine the oil. Saskatchewan, in particular, in the early 20th century grew economically due to the Canadian agricultural boom and produce large crops of wheat. It is said to have a "one-crop economy" due to such dependency on this crop alone, but after 1945 the economy took another turn with technological advancements that allowed for the discovery of uranium, oil, and potash.

=== Wheat ===
Marquis wheat played a decisive role in reshaping farming in the Prairie provinces, with their rich soils and long winters. Marquis wheat matured a week earlier than its predecessor, Red Fife. The ripe Marquis could be harvested before the damaging early autumn frosts hit, thus sharply reducing the risk of crop failure. It equalled the superior milling and baking qualities of its parent, Red Fife. Marquis hard red spring wheat made excellent bread flour due to its high protein and strong gluten content. This established Canada's reputation for high-quality export wheat. Per acre Marquis also gave high yields By 1920, Marquis accounted for 90 percent of the hard red spring wheat planted on the Canadian Prairies, doubling wheat production in some areas between 1906 and 1920. This opportunity attracted farmers from eastern Canada and the United states, as well as Ukraine, Germany and Scandinavia who arrived before World War I shut down travel in 1914. Hybrid Marquis Wheat thus played a central role in establishing the Prairie provinces as a major global grain-exporting area.

== Culture and politics ==
The Prairies are distinguished from the rest of Canada by cultural and political traits. The oldest influence on Prairie culture are the First Nations, who have inhabited this region for millennia. This region has the highest proportion of Indigenous people in Canada, outside of the three territories. The first Europeans to see the Prairies were fur traders and explorers from eastern Canada (mainly present-day Quebec) and Great Britain via Hudson Bay. They gave rise to the Métis, who were working class "children of the fur trade."

During their settlement by Europeans, the prairies were settled in distinct ethnic block settlements giving areas distinctively British, Ukrainian, German, French, or Scandinavian Canadian cultures. Farm family operations predominate, where families supplement their cash income with home-grown farm produce. Grain crops are the main cash crop, but mixed farming had natural advantages in the wooded areas of the parkland and boreal forest to the north. Local conditions attracted particular ethnicities. Those of Ukrainians and Polish heritage were drawn to the parkland of east north-central Alberta.

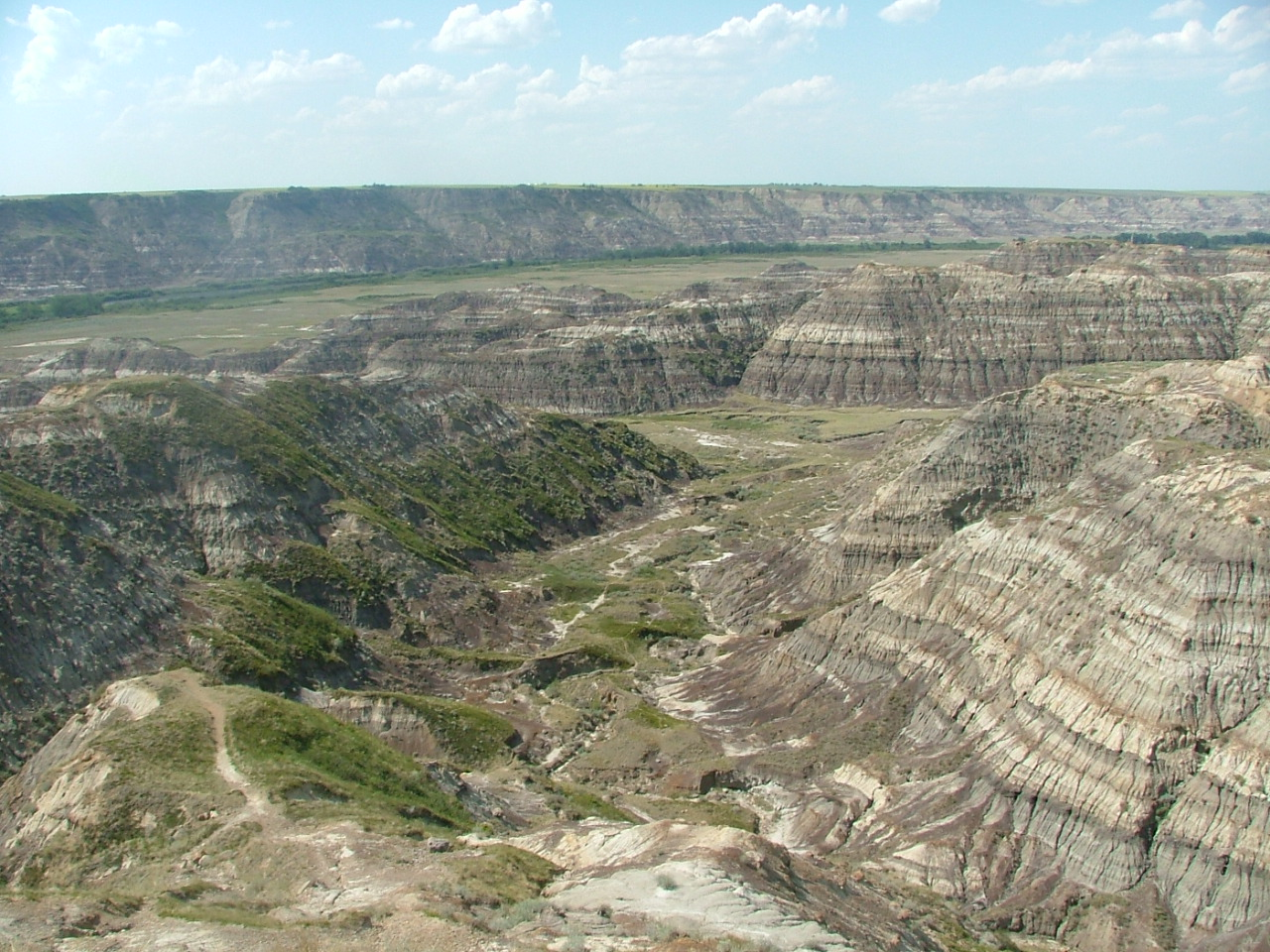
The Alberta badlands

Southern Alberta is renowned for its cowboy culture, which developed when real open range ranching was practiced in the 1880s. Canada's first rodeo, the Raymond Stampede, was established in 1902. These influences are also evident in the music of Canada's Prairie Provinces. This can be attributed partially to the massive influx of American settlers who began to migrate to Alberta (and to a lesser extent, Saskatchewan) in the late 1880s because of the lack of available land in the United States.

The Prairie Provinces have given rise to the "prairie protest" movements. Radical solutions are sometimes considered sound in the more open western culture. Organized farmer groups and politicized labour groups were a feature of the inter-war years. The One Big Union was founded on the Prairies; the Winnipeg general strike (1919) was the biggest general strike in Canadian history. The United Farmers of Alberta was the longest-lasting post-WWI farmer government in Canada. Monetary reform (Social Credit) elected its first government in the world, the Alberta Social Credit Party, in the 1935 Alberta general election. The Reform Party of Canada (1987 to 2000), founded by Preston Manning, had its strongest support among Prairie voters.

These political movements (both of the left and right) tend to feed off of well established feelings of Western alienation, and each one represents a distinct challenge to the perceived Central Canadian elite.

The Prairies continue to have a wide range of political representation. While the Conservative Party of Canada has widespread support throughout the region at both federal and provincial levels, the New Democratic Party holds seats at the provincial level in all three provinces, and takes turns with Conservatives or another right-wing party at provincial government. The NDP holds seats at the federal level in Alberta and Manitoba. The Liberal Party of Canada often holds seats in Alberta and Manitoba; it presently holds six federal seats in Winnipeg, one in Saskatchewan, and two in Alberta. The Manitoba Liberal Party holds one seat in Manitoba.

== See also ==
- Dominion Land Survey
- High Plains (United States)
- List of regions of Canada
- Llano Estacado
- Natural Resources Acts
- Shortgrass prairie
- Ecozones of Canada
