= Saskatoon Youth Orchestra =

Canadian orchestra formed 1958

The Saskatoon Youth Orchestra (SYO) is a Canadian music program based in Saskatoon, Saskatchewan. The program includes the Youth Orchestra, the Saskatoon Strings, and the Double Bass program. The groups meet every Sunday evening September through April. Admittance is by competitive audition. The SYO plays a variety of music by modern and classical composers. About third of the members are young adults; the remainder are children and adolescents.

== History ==
The SYO was started in 1958, by Murray Adaskin, as a junior extension of the Saskatoon Symphony. In 1983, Wayne Toews and George Charpentier created the SYO as an independent organization. The SYO has been awarded the Christopher Gledhill award six times in succession in recognition of performance excellence. As well, the Youth Orchestra has toured many parts of eastern and western Canada, and has partaken in various music festivals and clinics.

In 1996, the orchestra performed as part of the first Banff International Music Festival.

In 2004, the Youth Orchestra traveled to Montreal as part of an exchange with the West Island Youth Orchestra. The SYO has been a featured subject in CBC and CTV documentaries. In July 2009, Richard Carnegie was named the new music director after the retirement of Wayne Toews.

In the 2014/2015 season, the SYO performed a variety of pieces from classical and contemporary repertoire, including Beethoven's Egmont Overture and Tchaikovsky's Romeo and Juliet Fantasy Overture.

As of 2016, the orchestra continues to perform concerts in Saskatoon, often with local celebrities and members of the Saskatoon Symphony Orchestra as guests.

== Activities ==
As well as performing concerts, the SYO holds an annual competition for young Saskatchewan composers, with the winner having their composition premiered by the SYO the following season. The SYO also holds an annual concerto competition amongst its players, with the winner being granted a performance of a concerto of his or her choosing at the orchestra's year-end concert.

Members of the orchestra also take part in workshops and mentor music students, and participate in community events. The orchestra raises funds each year by holding a gala dinner and performance.
