= List of tallest structures in Saskatchewan =

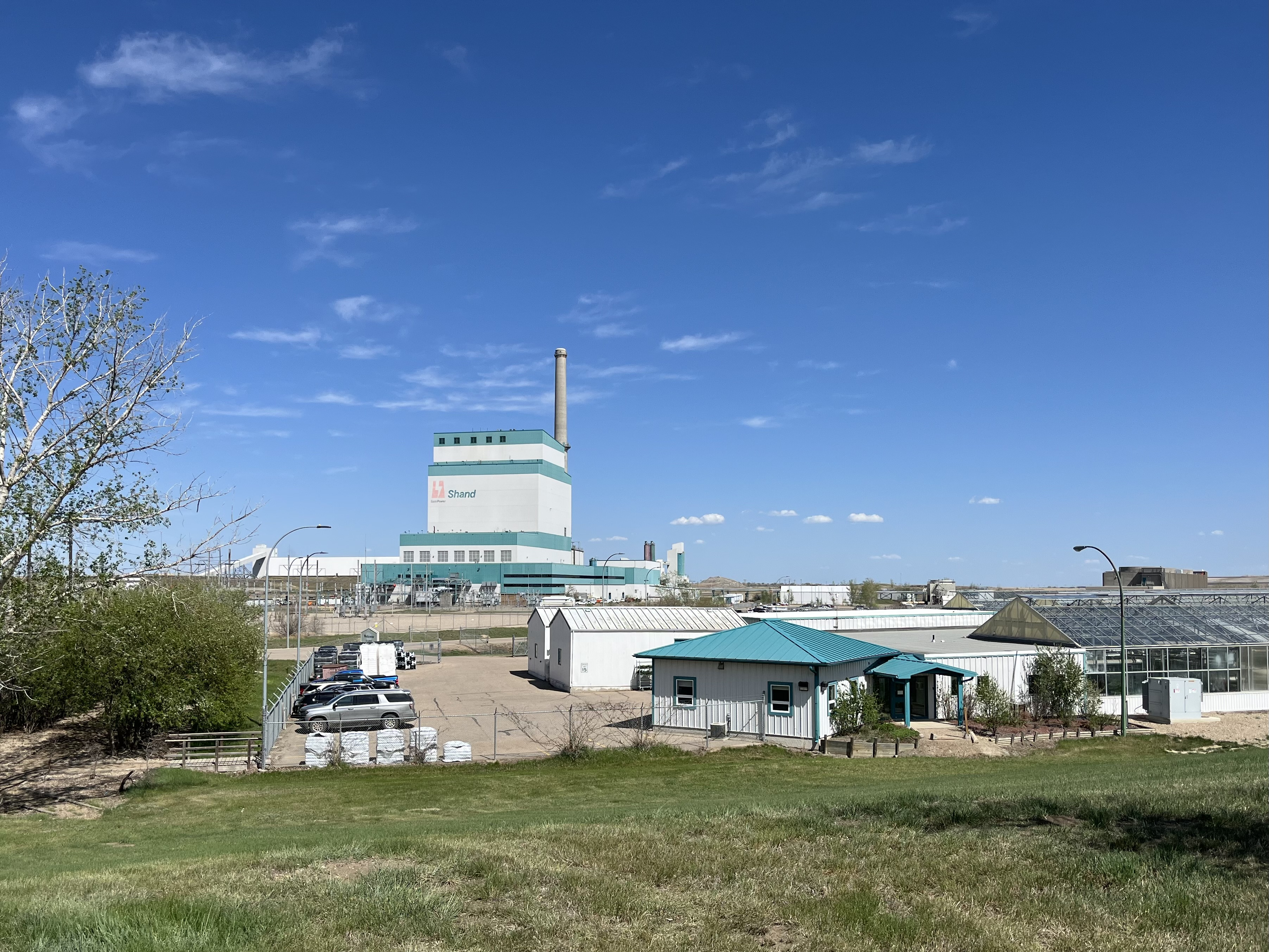
Shand Power Station, Estevan, whose smokestack is the tallest freestanding structure of any type in Saskatchewan.

Tallest structures in Saskatchewan by type

This is a list of the tallest structures in Saskatchewan, a province in Western Canada. The smokestack of Shand Power Station in Estevan, which stands at 148 m (486 ft), is the tallest freestanding structure in the province. Saskatchewan’s tallest buildings are found only in its two largest cities, Regina and Saskatoon, with the 88.5 m (290 ft) Nutrien Tower in Saskatoon being the tallest. As there are few skyscrapers in the province, especially outside of these two cities, most of the province’s tallest structures are headframes, smokestacks, and wind turbines.

== Tallest structures by type ==
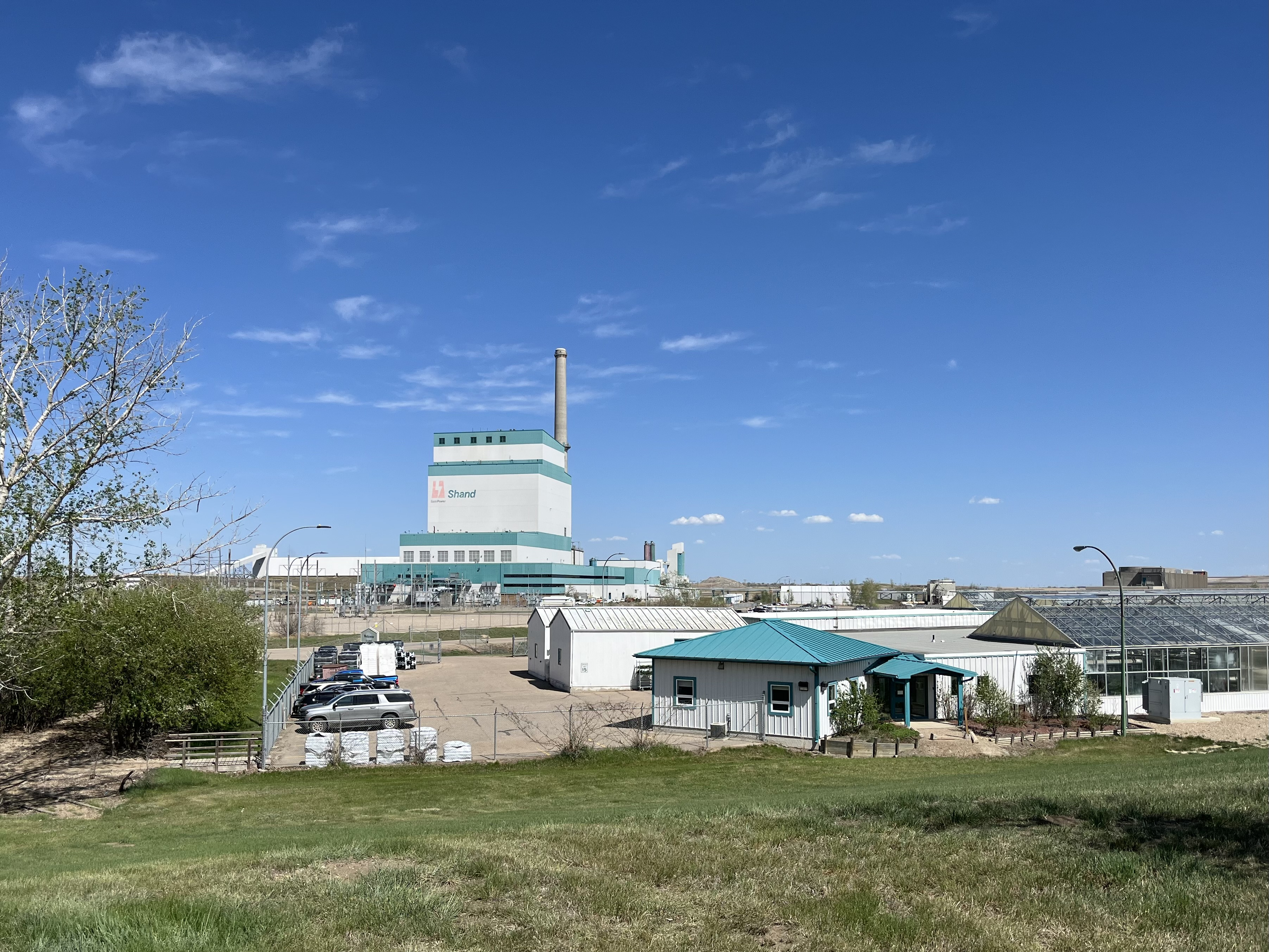
Shand Power Station, Estevan, whose smokestack is the tallest freestanding structure of any type in Saskatchewan

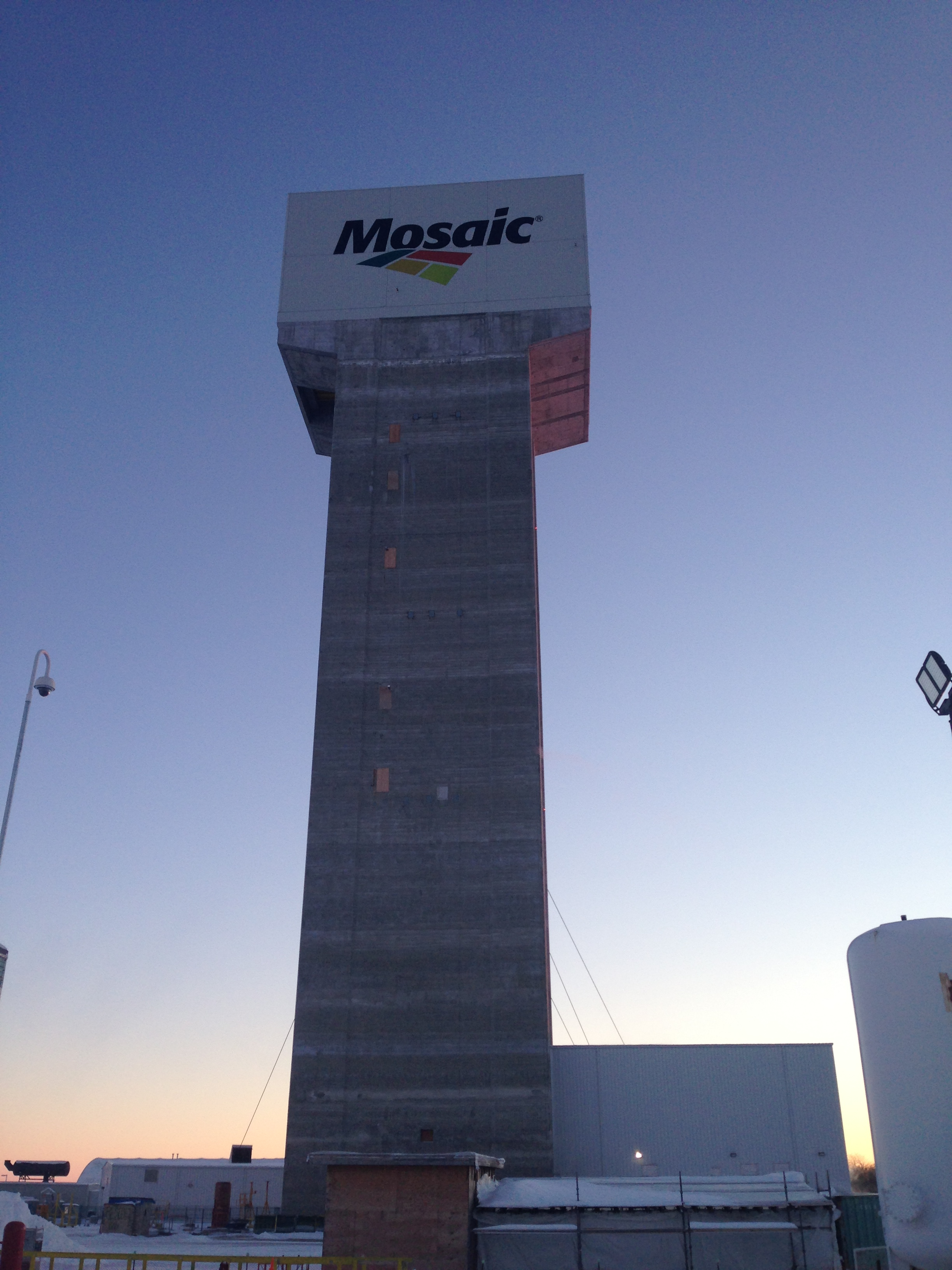
K3 Mine North Shaft headframe, Esterhazy, the tallest headframe in Saskatchewan

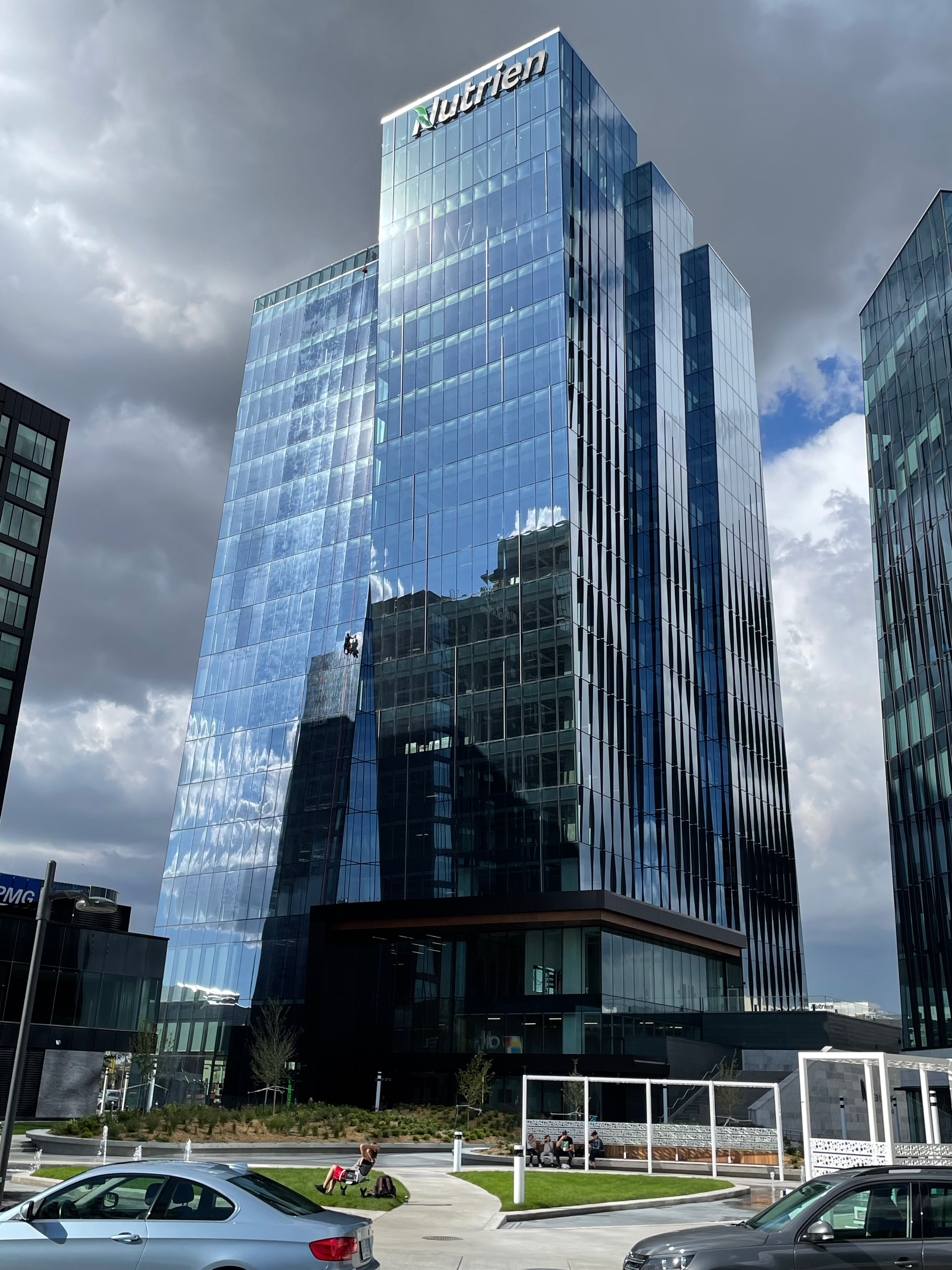
Nutrien Tower, Saskatoon, the tallest building in Saskatchewan

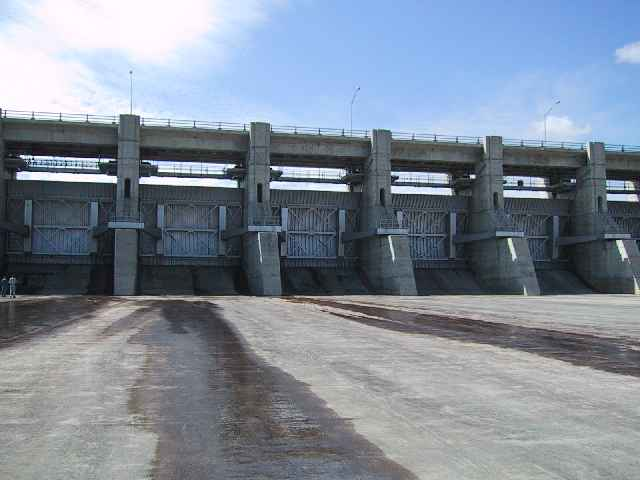
Spillway gates at Gardiner Dam, Cutbank, the tallest dam in Saskatchewan

Type	Name	Location	Height	Built	Source
Smokestack	Shand Power Station stack	Estevan	148 m (486 ft)	1992	
Cell tower	SaskTel tower at 55.2012°N 102.9085°W	Pelican Narrows	141 m (463 ft)		
Headframe	K3 Mine North Shaft headframe	Esterhazy	114 m (374 ft)	2018	
Wind turbine	Golden South Wind Facility wind turbines	Assiniboia	110 m (360 ft)	2022	
Building	Nutrien Tower	Saskatoon	88.5 m (290 ft)	2021	
Dam	Gardiner Dam	Cutbank	64 m (210 ft)	1967	
Bridge	SkyTrail Bridge	Outlook	47.5 m (156 ft)	1912	

== Tallest freestanding structures ==
=== Overall list ===
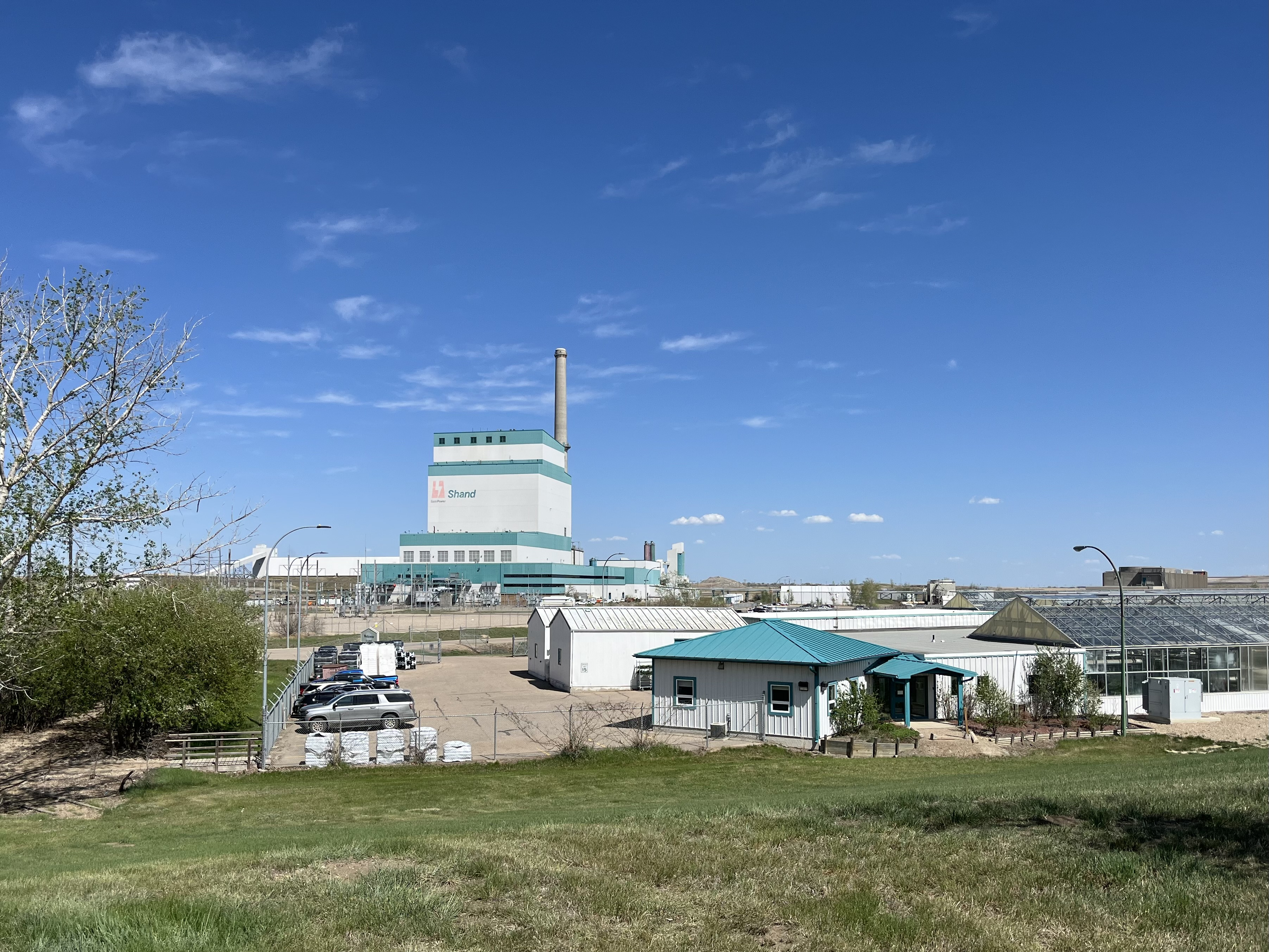
Shand Power Station, Estevan, whose smokestack is the tallest freestanding structure in Saskatchewan

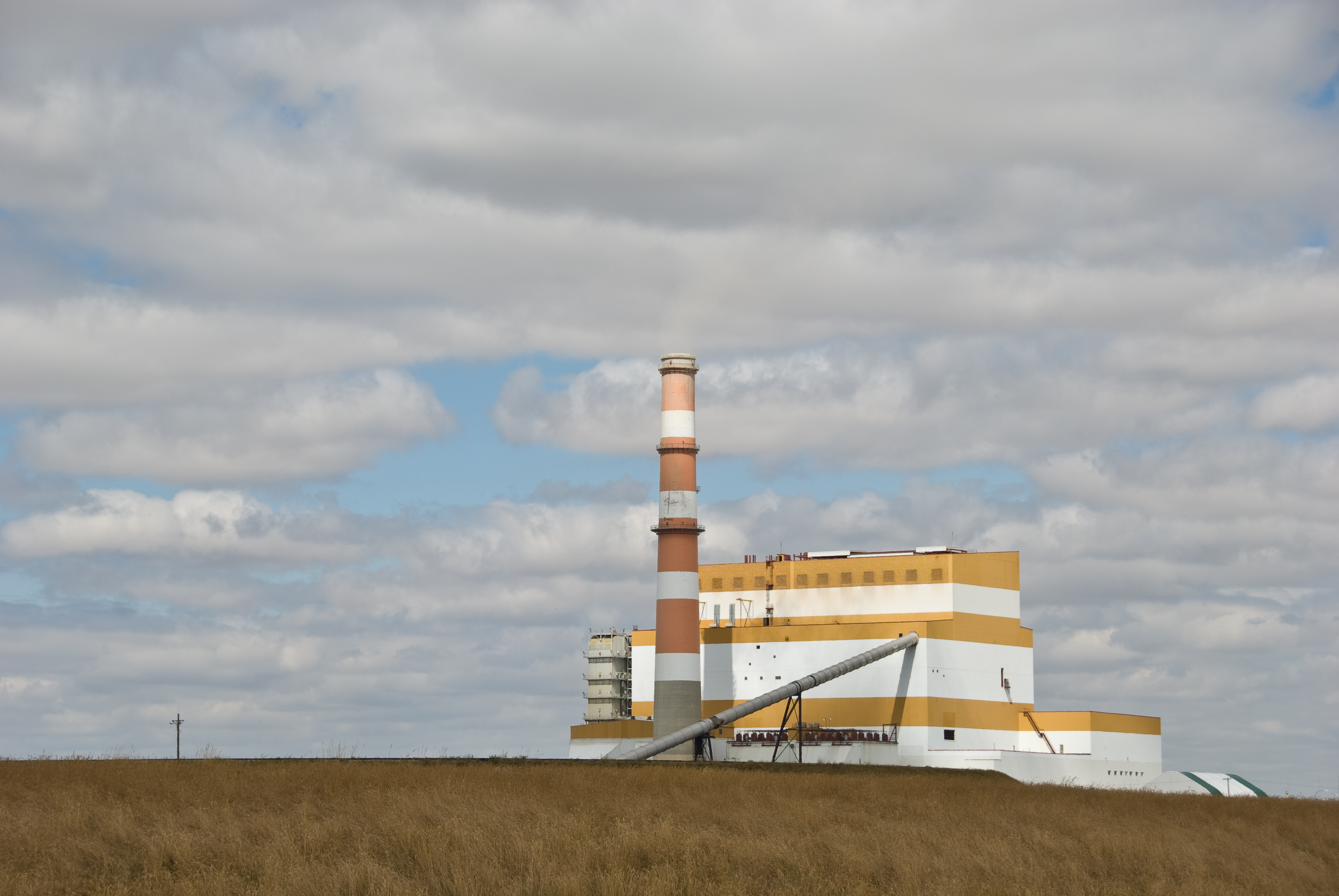
The Poplar River Power Station, Coronach, whose smoketack is the second tallest freestanding structure in Saskatchewan

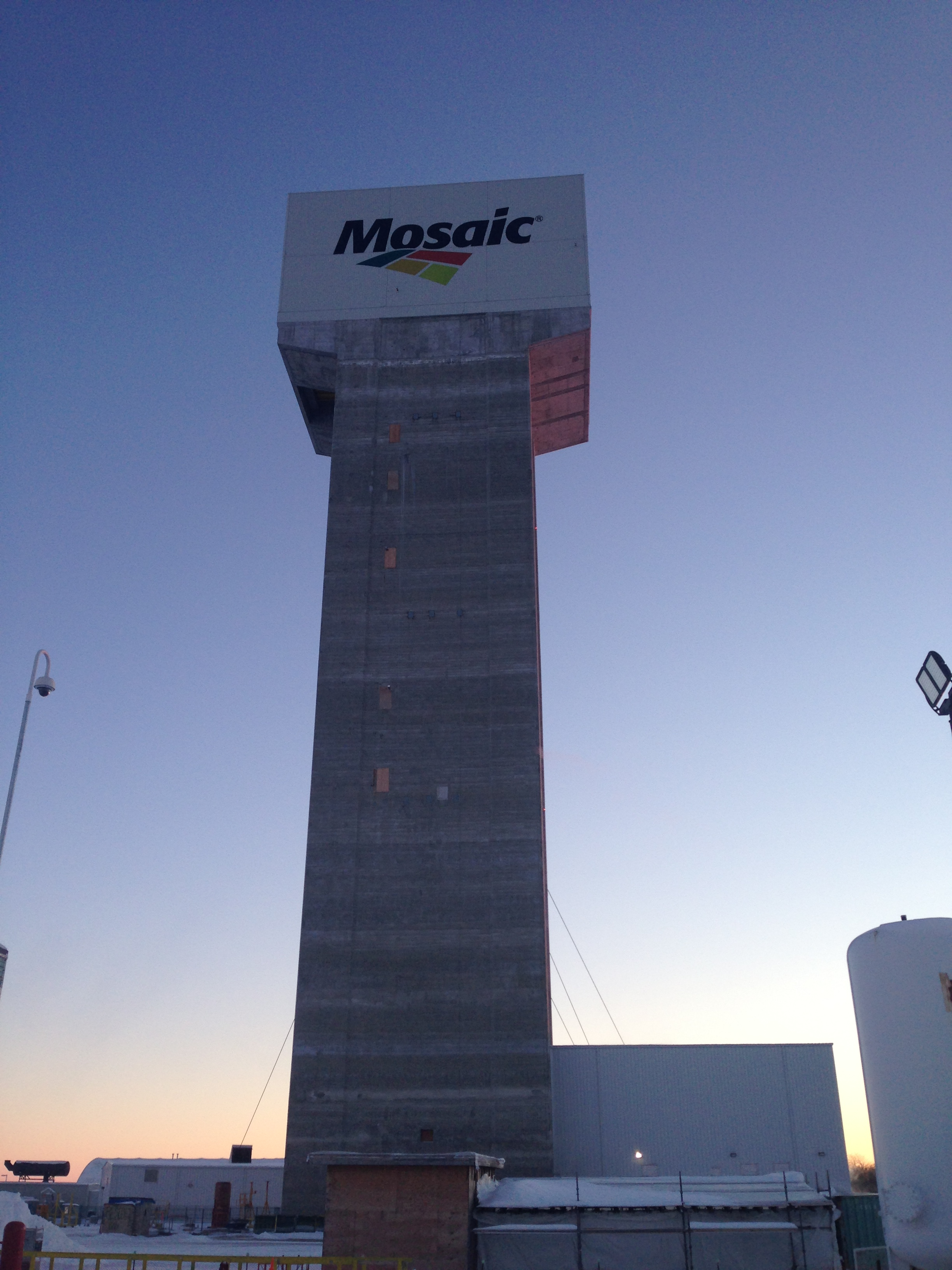
K3 Mine North Shaft headframe, Esterhazy, the third tallest freestanding structure in Saskatchewan

Rank	Name	Type	Location	Height	Built	Source
1	Shand Power Station stack	Smokestack	Estevan	148 m (486 ft)	1992	
2	Poplar River Power Station stack	Smokestack	Coronach	122 m (400 ft)	1981	
3	K3 Mine North Shaft headframe	Headframe	Esterhazy	114 m (374 ft)	2018	
4	Golden South Wind Facility wind turbines	Wind turbine	Assiniboia	110 m (360 ft)	2022	
5	Bekevar Wind Facility wind turbines	Wind turbine	Kipling	108 m (354 ft)	2024	
6	Rocanville Mine headframe	Headframe	Rocanville	107 m (351 ft)	2017	
7	K3 Mine South Shaft headframe	Headframe	Esterhazy	102 m (335 ft)	2021	
8	Jansen Project headframe	Headframe	Jansen	97 m (318 ft)	2012	
9	Allan Mine headframe	Headframe	Allan	95.7 m (314 ft)	2009	
10	K2 Mine headframe	Headframe	Gerald	94.8 m (311 ft)	1967	
11	Blue Hill Wind Facility wind turbines	Wind turbine	Herbert	92 m (302 ft) (Note: Plans list the height as between 80 m and 105 m. This article uses the geometric mean of 92 m to best represent the turbines.)	2021	
12	Boundary Dam Power Station stack 1	Smokestack	Estevan	91.4 m (300 ft)		
12	Boundary Dam Power Station stack 2	Smokestack	Estevan	91.4 m (300 ft)		
12	Boundary Dam Power Station stack 3	Smokestack	Estevan	91.4 m (300 ft)		
12	Boundary Dam Power Station stack 4	Smokestack	Estevan	91.4 m (300 ft)		
12	Boundary Dam Power Station stack 5	Smokestack	Estevan	91.4 m (300 ft)		
17	Nutrien Tower	Building	Saskatoon	88.5 m (290 ft)	2021	
18	Mosaic Potash Tower	Building	Regina	84.5 m (277 ft)	2013	
19	Delta Regina Hotel	Building	Regina	83.8 m (275 ft)	1988	
20	McCallum Hill Centre II	Building	Regina	80 m (260 ft)	1992	
20	Red Lily Wind Facility wind turbines	Wind turbine	Moosomin	80 m (260 ft)	2011	
22	Morse Wind Facility wind turbines	Wind turbine	Morse	79.5 m (261 ft)	2015	
23	La Renaissance Apartments	Building	Saskatoon	79.3 m (260 ft)	1983	
24	C.M. Fines Building	Building	Regina	79 m (259 ft)	1979	
25	Hallmark Place	Building	Saskatoon	78.8 m (259 ft)	1984	

=== Tallest buildings ===
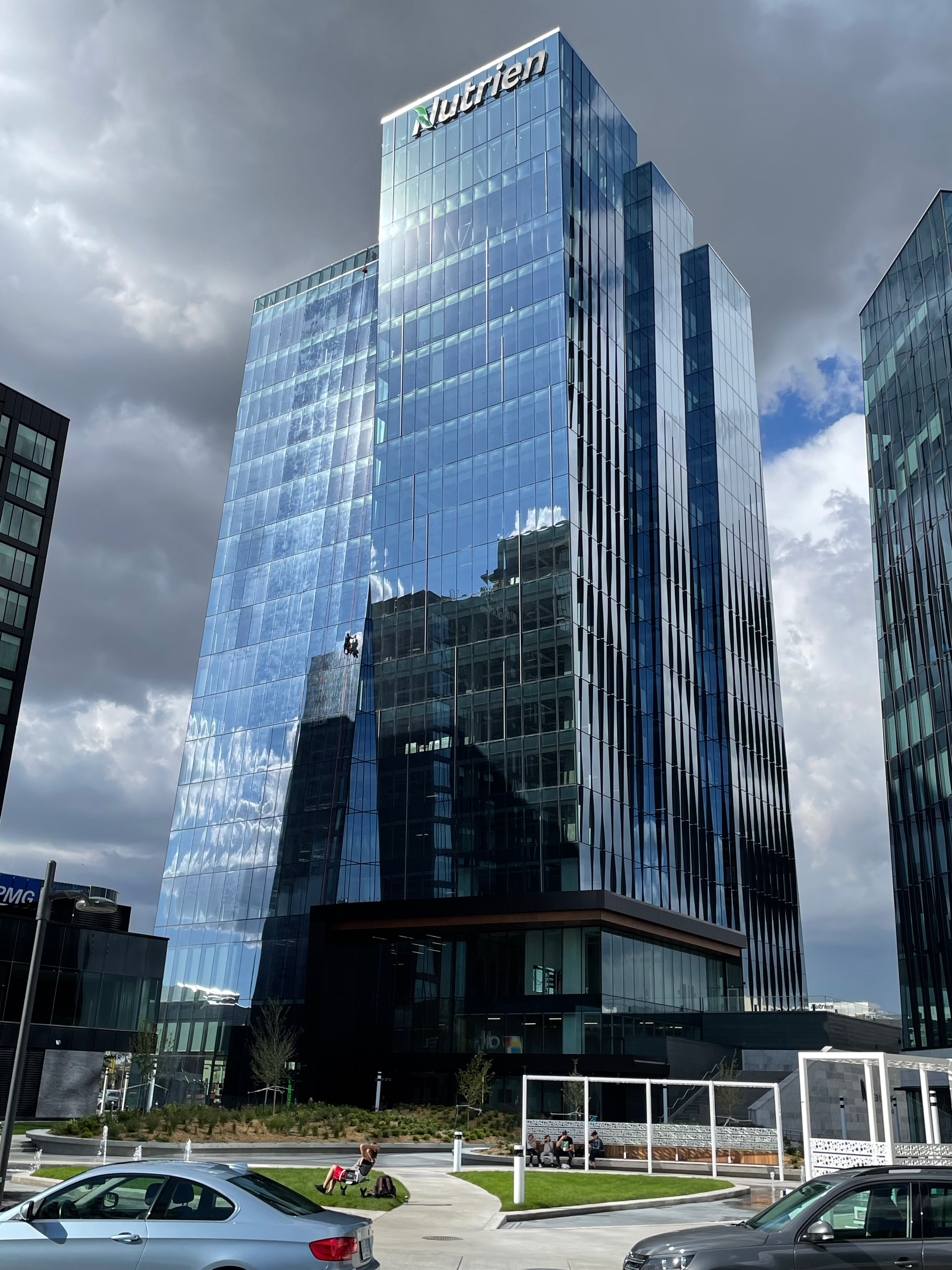
Nutrien Tower, the tallest building in Saskatoon and the tallest building in all of Saskatchewan

Buildings in downtown Regina, of which the Mosaic Potash Tower (right) is the tallest in the city

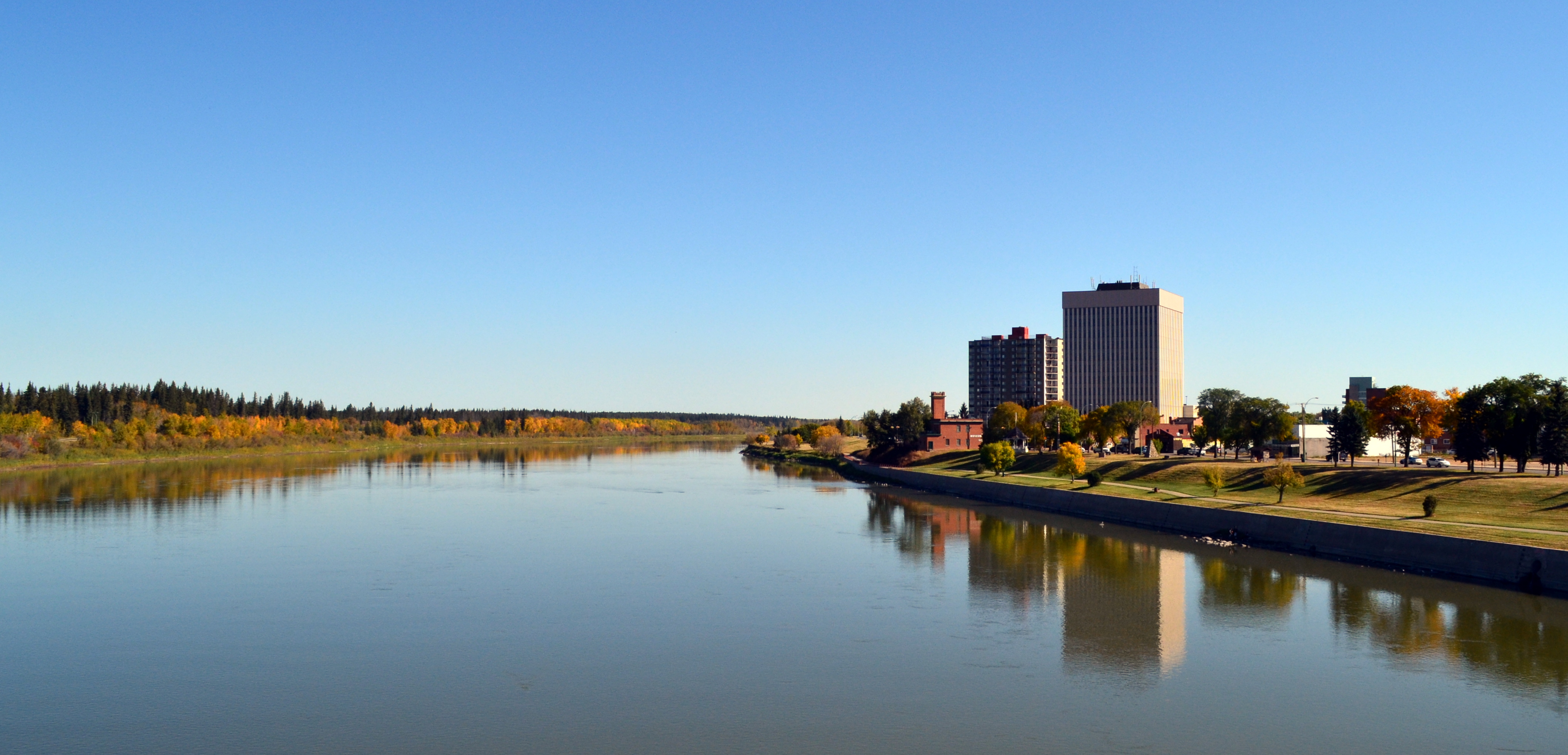
Buildings in Prince Albert, of which 33 River Street (left) and the L.F. McIntosh Building (right) are the tallest

Rank	Name	Location	Height	Built	Floors	Source
1	Nutrien Tower	Saskatoon	88.5 m (290 ft)	2021	18	
2	Mosaic Potash Tower	Regina	84.5 m (277 ft)	2013	20	
3	Delta Regina Hotel	Regina	83.8 m (275 ft)	1988	25	
4	McCallum Hill Centre II	Regina	80 m (260 ft)	1992	20	
5	La Renaissance Apartments	Saskatoon	79.3 m (260 ft)	1983	24	
6	C.M. Fines Building	Regina	79 m (259 ft)	1979	20	
7	Hallmark Place	Saskatoon	78.8 m (259 ft)	1984	26	
8	McCallum Hill Centre I	Regina	78 m (256 ft)	1985	20	
8	The Luther	Saskatoon	78 m (256 ft)	1978	22	
8	The Terrace Apartments	Saskatoon	78 m (256 ft)	1980	22	
8	The View on Fifth	Saskatoon	78 m (256 ft)	1968	22	

=== Tallest headframes ===
Rank	Name	Location	Height	Built	Source
1	K3 Mine North Shaft headframe	Esterhazy	114 m (374 ft)	2018	
2	Rocanville Mine headframe	Rocanville	107 m (351 ft)	2017	
3	K3 Mine South Shaft headframe	Esterhazy	102 m (335 ft)	2021	
4	Jansen Project headframe	Jansen	97 m (318 ft)	2012	
5	Allan Mine headframe	Allan	95.7 m (314 ft)	2009	

=== Tallest smokestacks ===
Rank	Name	Location	Height	Built	Source
1	Shand Power Station stack	Estevan	148 m (486 ft)	1992	
2	Poplar River Power Station stack	Coronach	122 m (400 ft)	1981	
3	Boundary Dam Power Station stack 1	Estevan	91.4 m (300 ft)		
3	Boundary Dam Power Station stack 2	Estevan	91.4 m (300 ft)		
3	Boundary Dam Power Station stack 3	Estevan	91.4 m (300 ft)		
3	Boundary Dam Power Station stack 4	Estevan	91.4 m (300 ft)		
3	Boundary Dam Power Station stack 5	Estevan	91.4 m (300 ft)		

=== Tallest sets of wind turbines ===
Measured to the top of the supporting tower of the turbine.

Rank	Name	Location	Tallest	Count	Built	Source
1	Golden South Wind Facility wind turbines	Assiniboia	110 m (360 ft)	50	2022	
2	Bekevar Wind Facility wind turbines	Kipling	108 m (354 ft)	36	2024	
3	Blue Hill Wind Facility wind turbines	Herbert	92 m (302 ft)	35	2021	
4	Red Lily Wind Facility wind turbines	Moosomin	80 m (260 ft)	16	2011	
5	Morse Wind Facility wind turbines	Morse	79.5 m (261 ft)	10	2015	

== Other tallest structures ==
=== Tallest dams ===
Rank	Name	Location	Height	Built	Source
1	Gardiner Dam	Cutbank	64 m (210 ft)	1967	
2	Grant Devine Dam	Alameda	42 m (138 ft)	1995	
3	Qu'Appelle River Dam	Bridgeford	27.4 m (90 ft)	1967	
4	Northminster Effluent Reservoir dam	Lloydminster	25.3 m (83 ft)	1988	
5	Rafferty Dam	Estevan	20.5 m (67 ft)	1991	

=== Tallest guyed masts ===
==== Cell towers ====
Rank	Name	Location	Height	Source
1	SaskTel tower at 55.2012°N 102.9085°W	Pelican Narrows	141 m (463 ft)	
2	SaskTel tower at 51.6012°N 101.7136°W	Kamsack	137 m (449 ft)	
2	SaskTel tower at 51.9647°N 108.5982°W	Kelfield	137 m (449 ft)	
2	SaskTel tower at 52.4216°N 102.6472°W	Reserve	137 m (449 ft)	
2	SaskTel tower at 52.5875°N 102.5558°W	Bertwell	137 m (449 ft)	
2	SaskTel tower at 54.1050°N 105.9625°W	Montreal Lake	137 m (449 ft)	
7	SaskTel tower at 50.3159°N 103.9291°W	Vibank	136 m (446 ft)	
7	SaskTel tower at 51.0401°N 103.4124°W	Ituna	136 m (446 ft)	
7	SaskTel tower at 53.7613°N 105.8861°W	Anglin Lake	136 m (446 ft)	
10	SaskTel tower at 49.5919°N 109.8567°W	Fort Walsh	135 m (443 ft)	

==== Radio towers ====
This table lists the ten greatest heights above average terrain for radio towers in Saskatchewan, which is typically greater than the height of the tower structure.

Rank	Name	Location	HAAT
1	CFRE-DT tower	Disley	300 m (980 ft)
2	CFQC-DT tower	Saskatoon	267.9 m (879 ft)
3	Former CKBI-TV tower	Prince Albert	236.6 m (776 ft)
4	CBC Radio tower	Meadow Lake	227.4 m (746 ft)
5	CBC Radio tower	Regina	223 m (732 ft)
6	CIPA-DT tower	Prince Albert	212 m (696 ft)
7	CFSK-DT tower	Saskatoon	195 m (640 ft)
8	CKCK-DT tower	Regina	187.2 m (614 ft)
9	Former CKOS-TV tower	Yorkton	170 m (560 ft)
10	Former CJFB-TV tower	Swift Current	155.8 m (511 ft)

== Tallest destroyed structures ==
Rank	Name	Type	Location	Height	Built	Destroyed	Source
1	K1 Mine headframe	Headframe	Yarbo	51.8 m (170 ft)	1962	2022	

== Timeline of tallest structures ==
=== Timeline of tallest freestanding structures ===
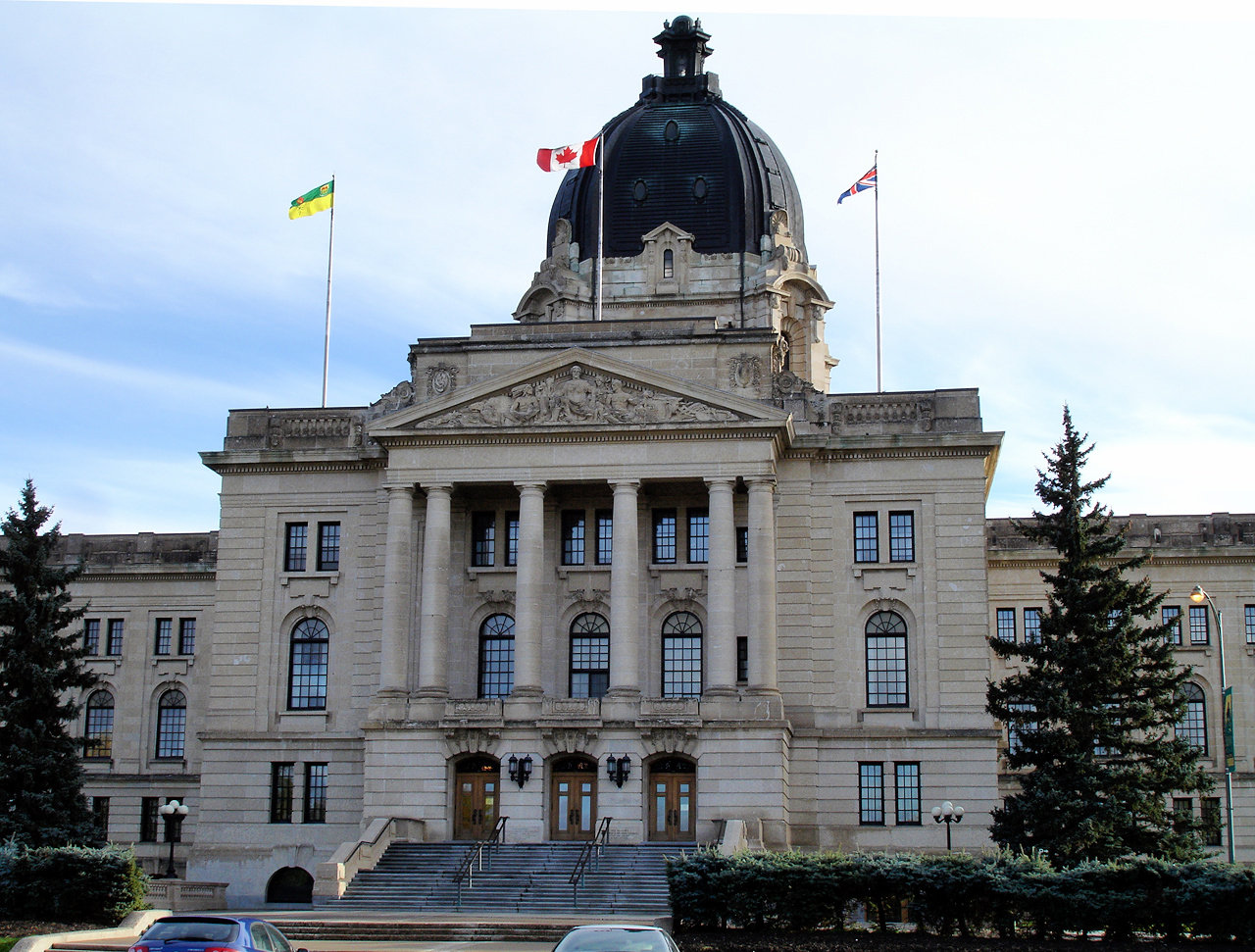
The Saskatchewan Legislative Building, Regina, was the tallest freestanding structure in Saskatchewan from 1912 to 1927

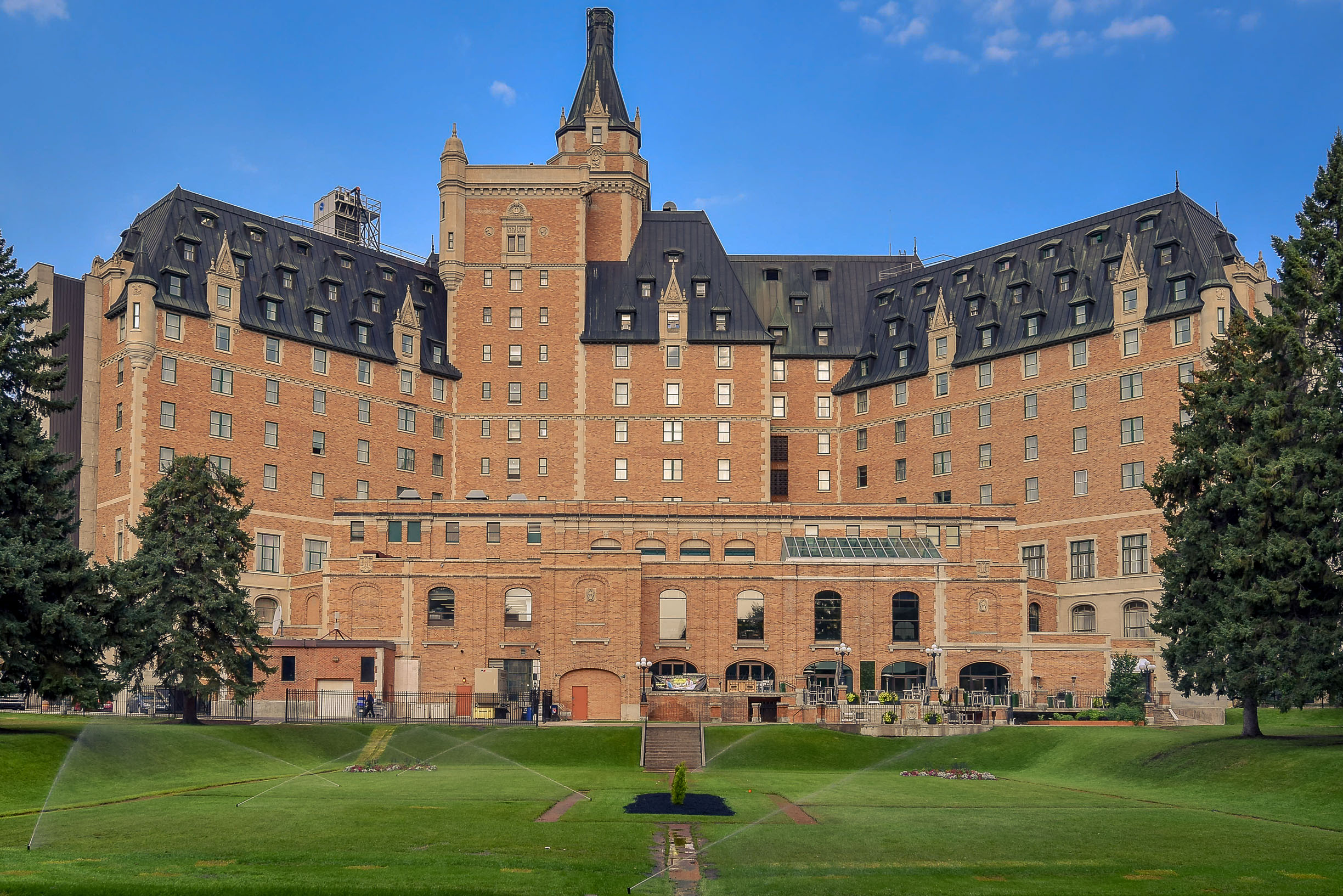
The Delta Bessborough, Saskatoon, was the tallest freestanding structure in Saskatchewan from 1932 to 1966

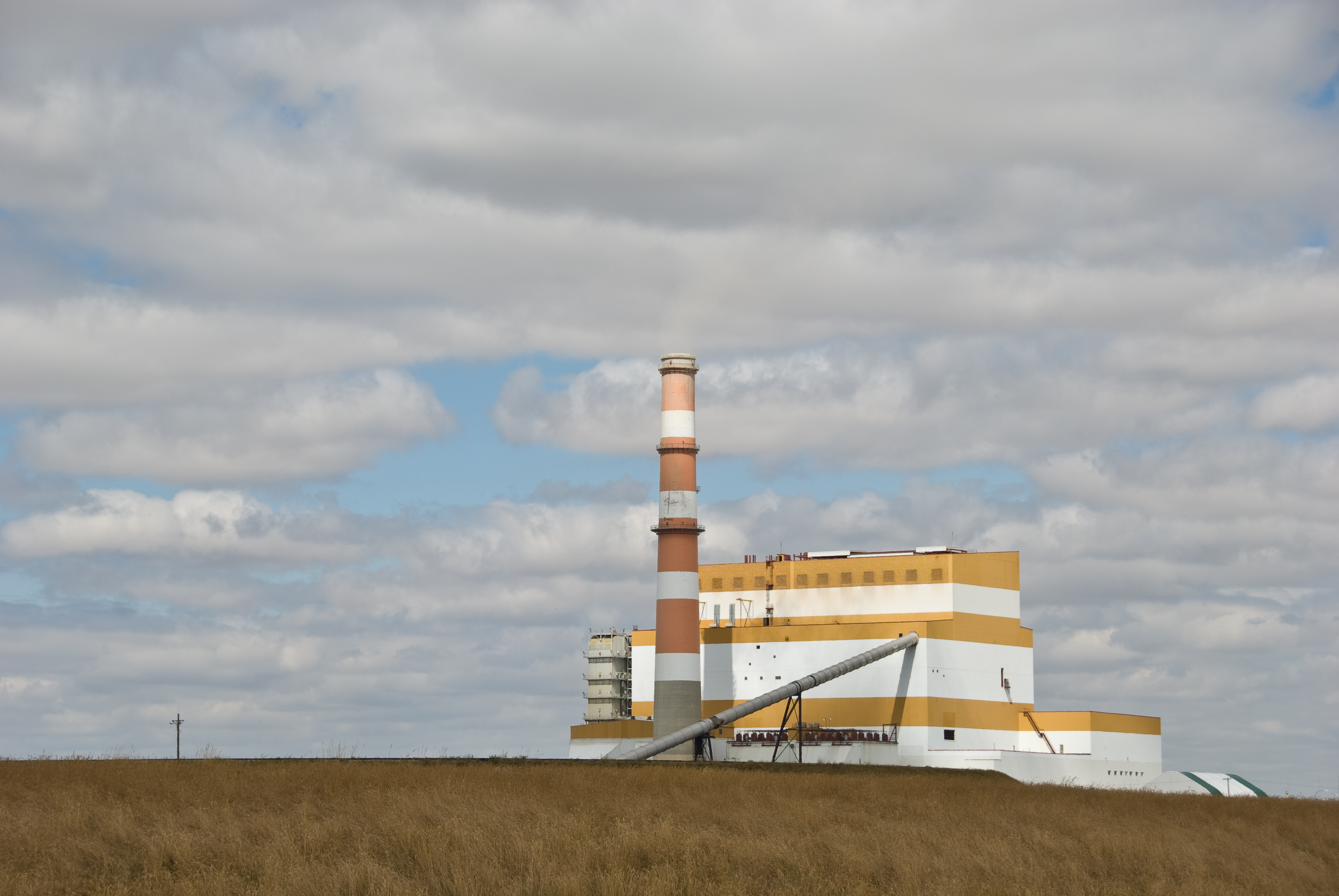
The Poplar River Power Station, Coronach, whose smoketack was the province's tallest freestanding structure from 1981 to 1992

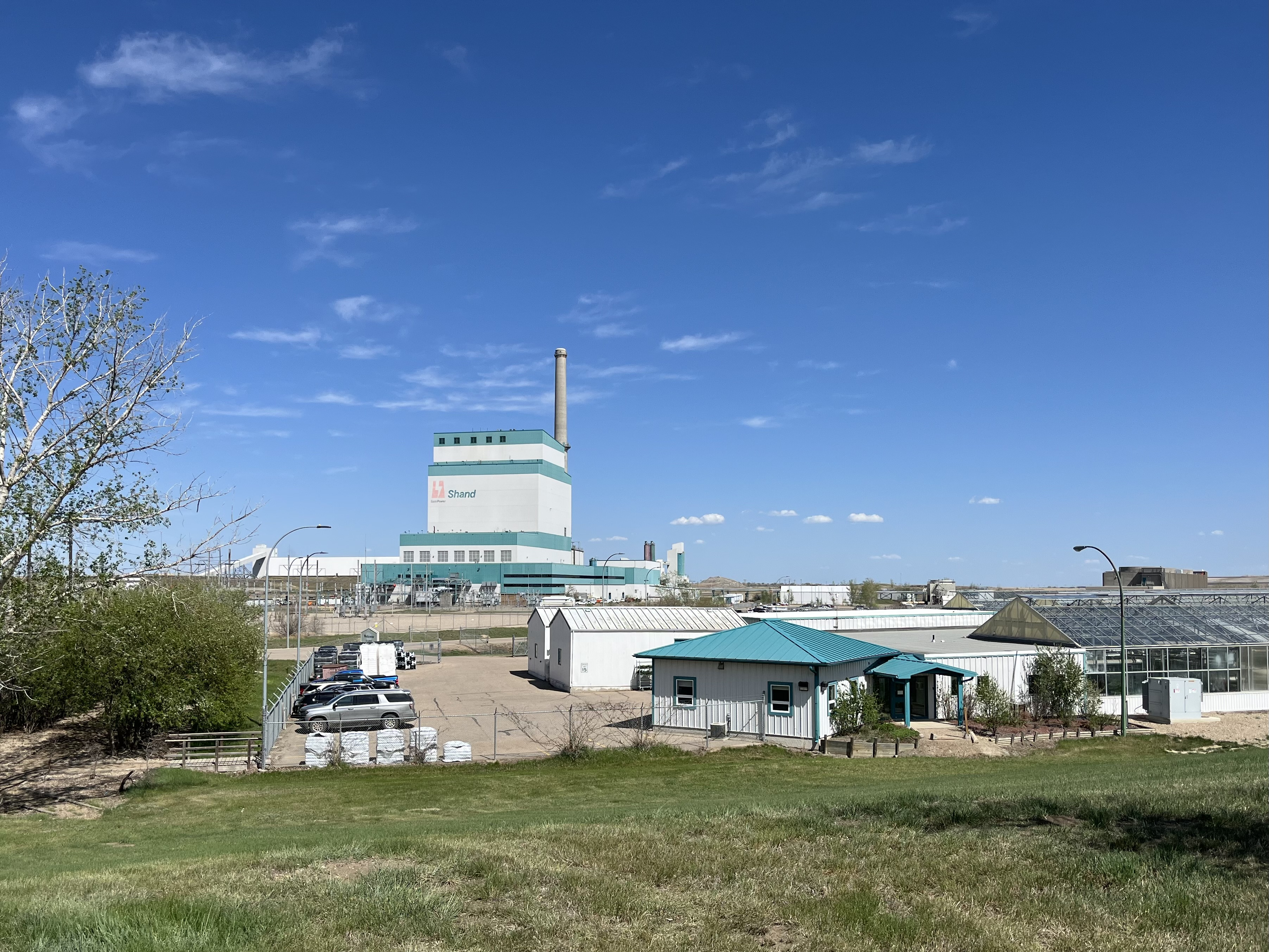
Shand Power Station, Estevan, whose smokestack has been the tallest freestanding structure in Saskatchewan since 1992

Years tallest	Name	Type	Location	Height	Source
1912–1927	Saskatchewan Legislative Building	Building	Regina	53 m (174 ft)	
1927–1932	Hotel Saskatchewan	Building	Regina	55 m (180 ft)	
1932–1959	Delta Bessborough	Building	Saskatoon	58.5 m (192 ft)	
1959–1967	Boundary Dam Power Station stacks	Smokestack	Estevan	91.4 m (300 ft)	
1967–1981	K2 Mine headframe	Headframe	Gerald	94.8 m (311 ft)	
1981–1992	Poplar River Power Station stack	Smokestack	Coronach	122 m (400 ft)	
1992–present	Shand Power Station stack	Smokestack	Estevan	148 m (486 ft)	

=== Timeline of tallest buildings ===
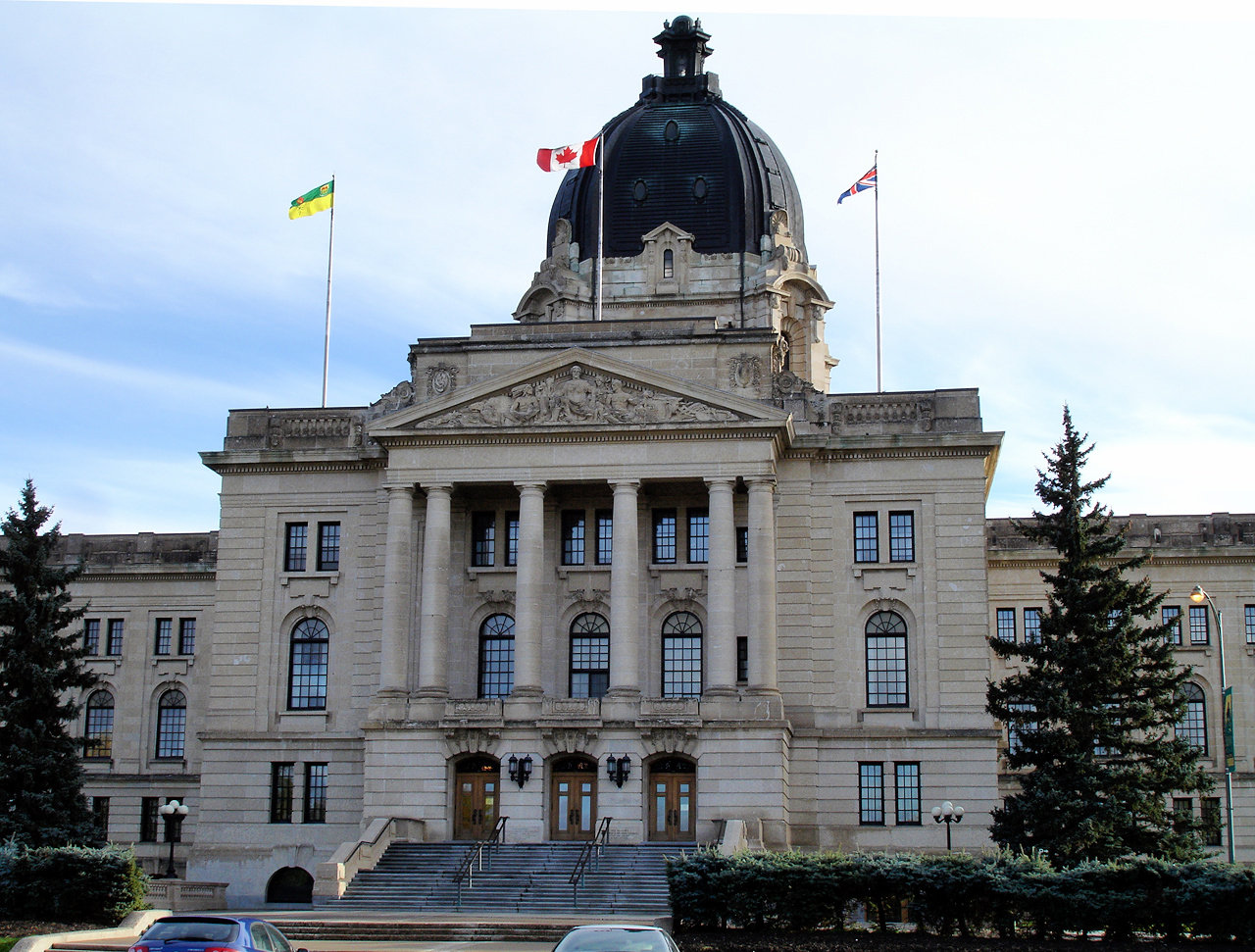
The Saskatchewan Legislative Building, Regina, was the province's first building to reach over 50 metres in height

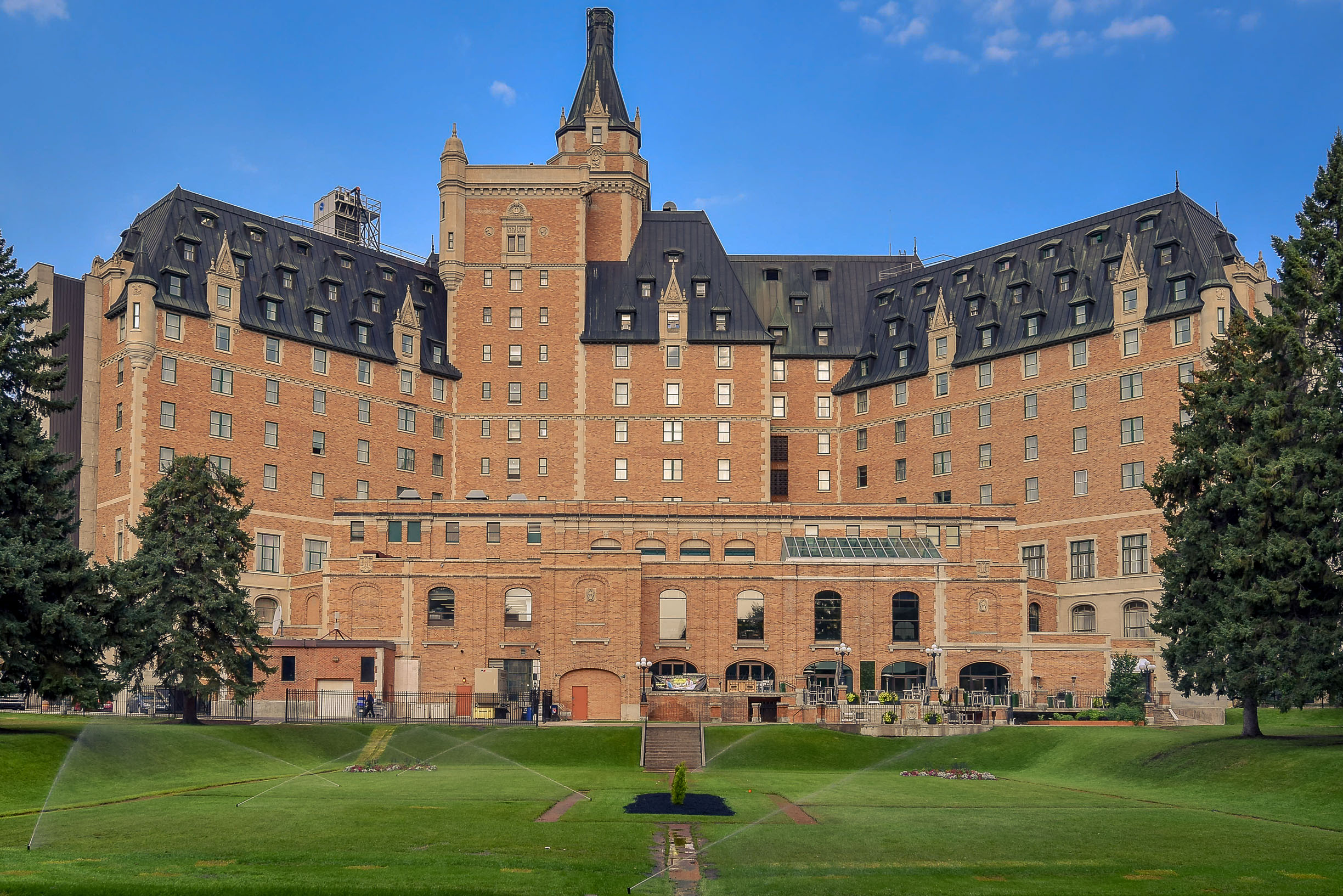
The Delta Bessborough, Saskatoon, was the tallest building in Saskatchewan from 1932 to 1966

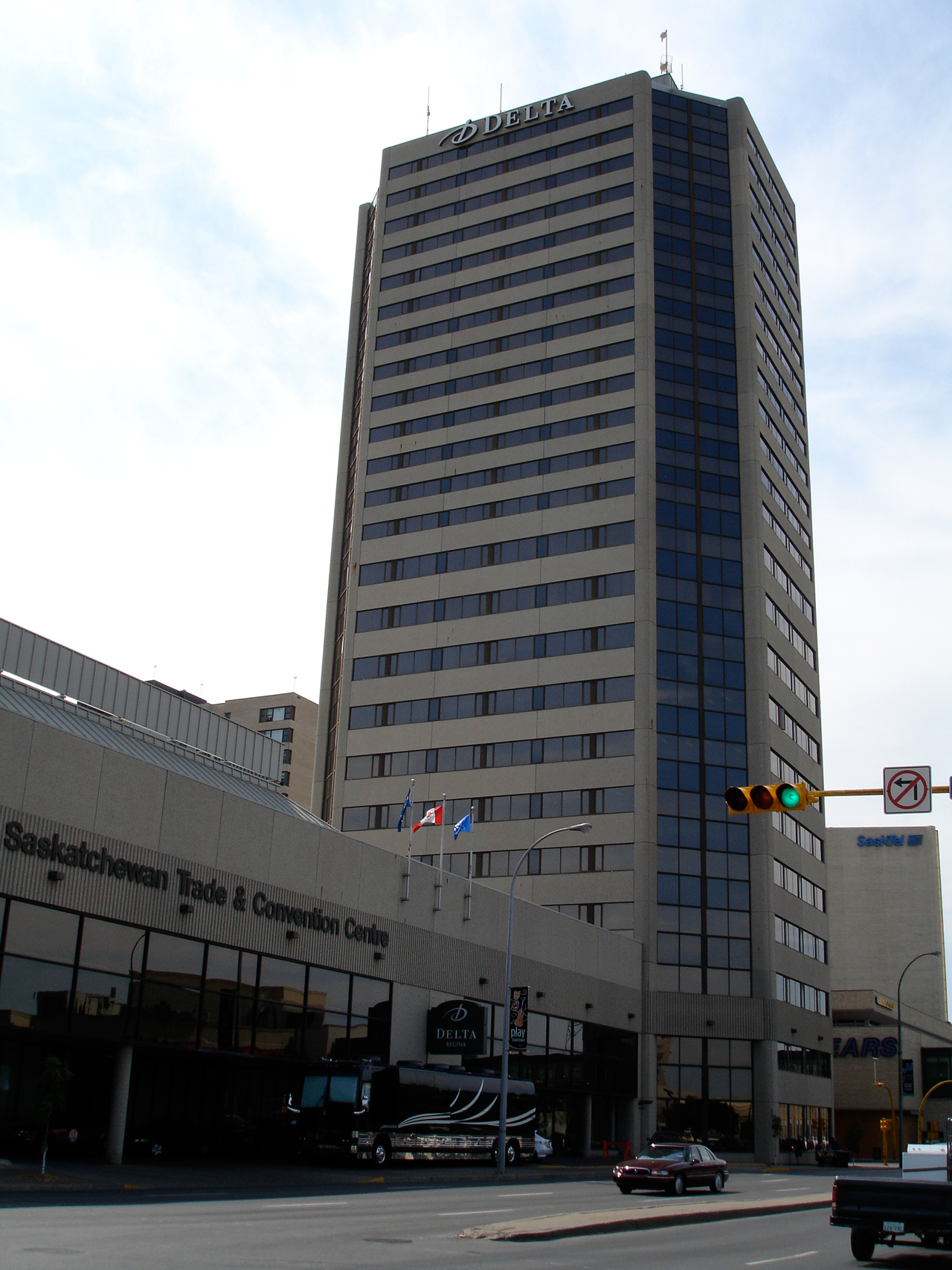
The Delta Regina Hotel, Regina, was the province's tallest building from 1988 to 2013

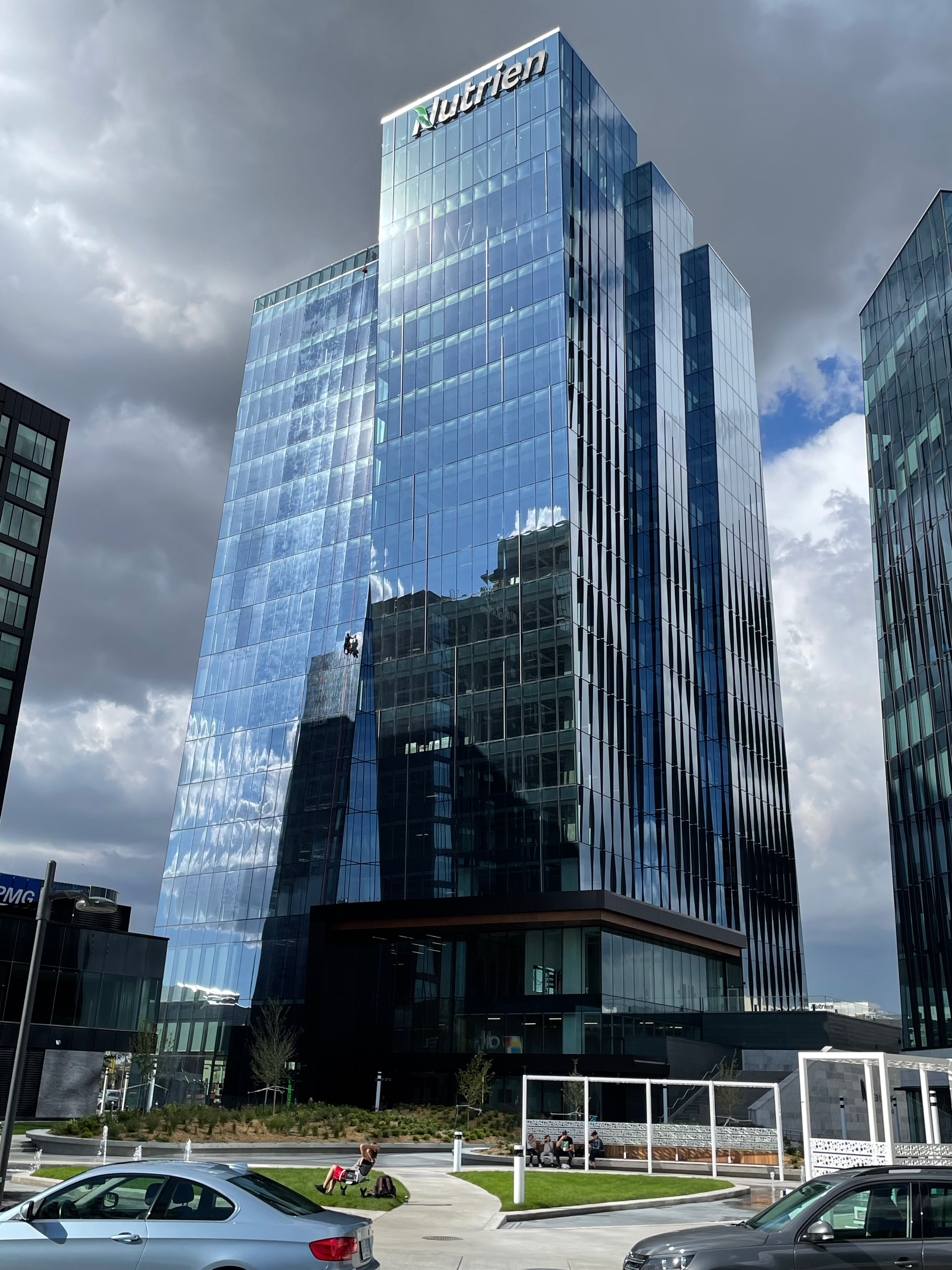
Nutrien Tower, Saskatoon, has been the tallest building in Saskatchewan since 2021

Years tallest	Name	Location	Height	Floors	Source
1912–1927	Saskatchewan Legislative Building	Regina	53 m (174 ft)	3	
1927–1932	Hotel Saskatchewan	Regina	55 m (180 ft)	14	
1932–1966	Delta Bessborough	Saskatoon	58.5 m (192 ft)	10	
1966–1968	Marquis Towers	Saskatoon	74.4 m (244 ft)	21	
1968–1979	The View on Fifth	Saskatoon	78 m (256 ft)	22	
1979–1983	C.M. Fines Building	Regina	79 m (259 ft)	20	
1983–1998	La Renaissance Apartments	Saskatoon	79.3 m (260 ft)	24	
1988–2013	Delta Regina Hotel	Regina	83.8 m (275 ft)	25	
2013–2021	Mosaic Potash Tower	Regina	84.5 m (277 ft)	20	
2021–present	Nutrien Tower	Saskatoon	88.5 m (290 ft)	18	

== See also ==
- List of tallest buildings in Canada
- List of tallest buildings in Regina, Saskatchewan
- List of tallest buildings in Saskatoon
- List of tallest structures in Canada
