= Queen Elizabeth II Court =

Queen Elizabeth II Court may refer to:

- Queen Elizabeth II Court, Regina, the city block containing Regina City Hall in Regina, Saskatchewan
- Queen Elizabeth II Courts of Law, a court building in Brisbane, Queensland, Australia
- Queen Elizabeth II Great Court, the covered central quadrangle of the British Museum in London
- Queen Elizabeth II Law Courts, Liverpool, in Derby Square, Liverpool
