= List of tallest buildings in Regina =

Skyline of Regina
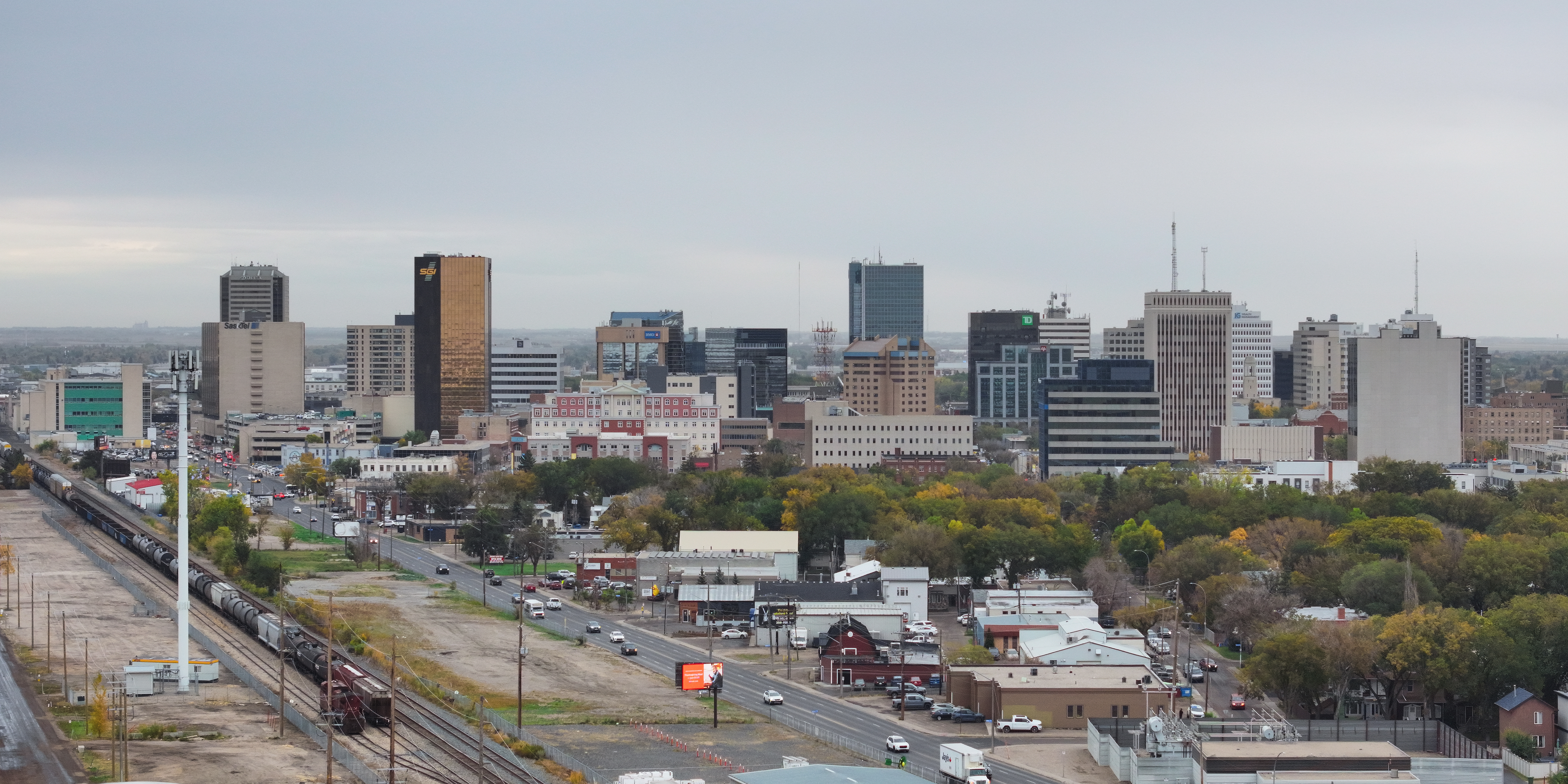
- Downtown Regina in 2025
- Tallest building: Mosaic Potash Tower (2013)
- Tallest building height: 84.5 m (277 ft)

Number of tall buildings
- 20 stories or more: 6 (2025)

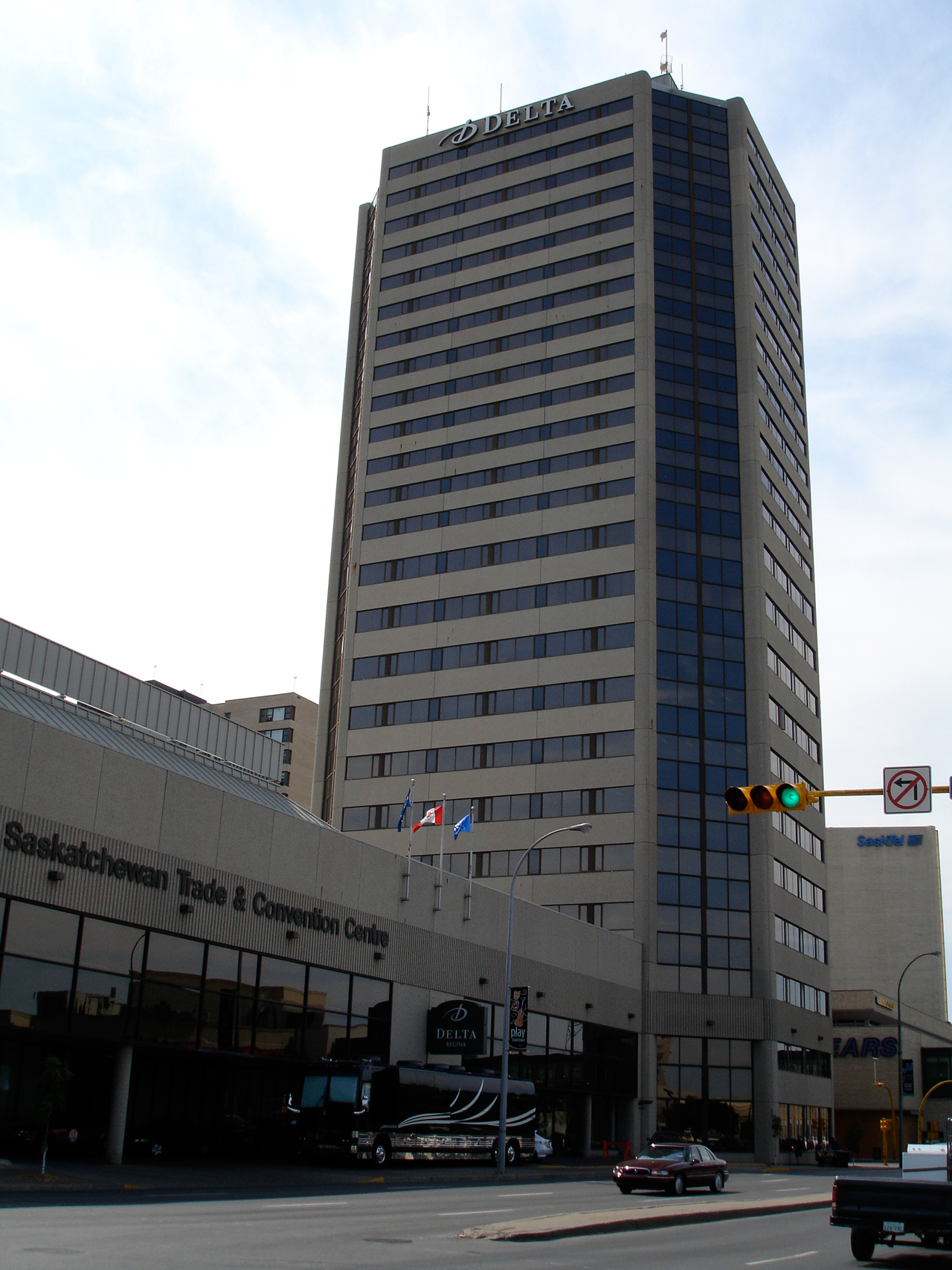
Delta Regina, the second tallest building in Regina

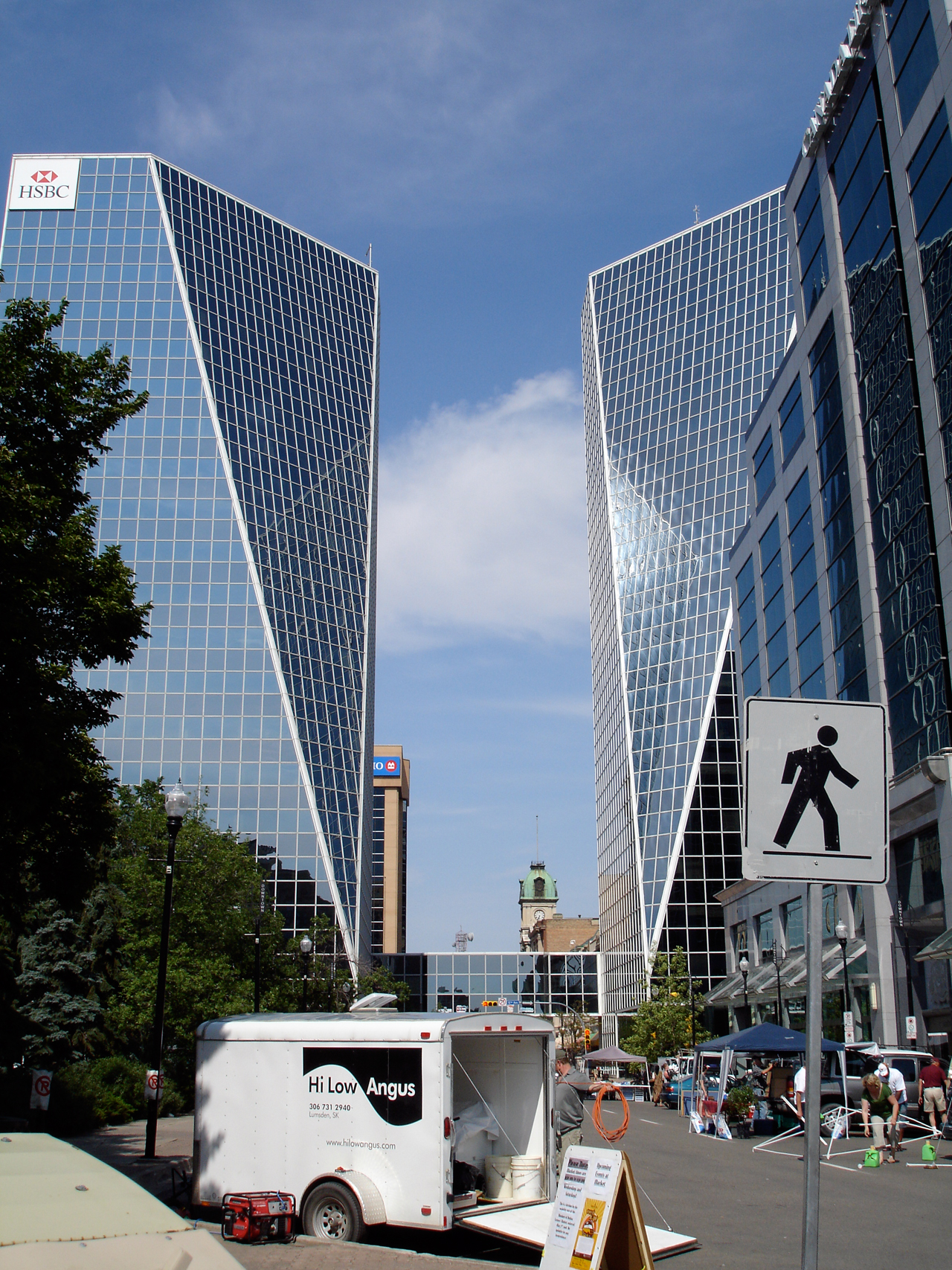
The McCallum Hill Towers.

This list of tallest buildings in Regina ranks skyscrapers in the city of Regina, Saskatchewan, Canada by height. Regina is the capital of Saskatchewan and the second largest city in the province after Saskatoon. The tallest building in Regina is the Mosaic Potash Tower, which rises 84.5 m (277 ft).

As of June 2025, the city contains 6 skyscrapers over 75 m (246 ft) and 41 high-rise buildings that exceed 35 m (115 ft) in height.

== Buildings ==
This list ranks buildings in Regina that stand at least 30 m (98.4 ft) tall, based on CTBUH height measurement standards. This includes spires and architectural details but does not include antenna masts.

Buildings completed as of October, 2016
Rank	Building	Height	Floors	Completed	Image	Notes
1	Mosaic Potash Tower	84.5 m (277 ft)	20	2013		Tallest building in Regina and second tallest building in Saskatchewan.
2	Delta Regina Hotel (formerly Radisson)	83.8 m (275 ft)	25	1988	Delta Regina hotel	
4	McCallum Hill Centre II	80 m (260 ft)	20	1992	McCallum Hill Tower II	
5	C.M. Fines Building (SGI)	79 m (259 ft)	20	1979	C.M. Fines Building	
6	McCallum Hill Centre I	78 m (256 ft)	20	1985	McCallum Hill Tower I	
7	Queen Elizabeth II Courts (City Hall)	68 m (223 ft)	16	1976	Regina City Hall	
8	Chateau Tower	65 m (213 ft)	17	1977		
9	Avord Tower	64 m (210 ft)	16	1967	Avord Tower	
10	Roberts Plaza	62 m (203 ft)	20	1972		
11	FCC Tower	62 m (203 ft)	14	1992		
12=	North Canadian Oils Building	60 m (200 ft)	14	1979		
12=	The Hamilton	60 m (200 ft)	14	1979		
12=	London Life Place	60 m (200 ft)	14	1977		
12=	Alvin Hamilton Building	60 m (200 ft)	14	1980		
16=	The Manor	58 m (190 ft)	14	1975		
16=	TD Bank Building	58 m (190 ft)	14	1975		
18	Centre Pointe Plaza	57 m (187 ft)	19	1976		
19	Hotel Saskatchewan Radisson Plaza	55 m (180 ft)	12	1927	Hotel Saskatchewan	
20=	Palliser Place	53 m (174 ft)	17			
20=	Saskatchewan Legislative Building	53 m (174 ft)	3	1912	Saskatchewan Legislative Building	
22	Bank of Montreal Building		12	1983		
23	Conexus Plaza		12	1985		
24	The Canadiana Apartments		15			
25=	Saskpower Building	51.8 m (169.9 ft)	13	1963	Saskpower Building	
25=	GrenFell Tower	51 m (167 ft)	14	1982		
25=	Double Tree Hotel & Conference Center	51 m (167 ft)	14	1967		
28	SaskTel Building	49 m (160 ft)	13	1981		
29	Cooper Place		11	1963		
30	Trianon Apartments		15			
31	Embury Heights		14			
32	Saskatchewan Wheat Pool Building		11			
33=	University Residence South Tower	45.1 m (147.9 ft)	12	2004		
33=	University Residence North Tower	45.1 m (147.9 ft)	12	2004		
35=	Gardens on Rose	45 m (147 ft)	13	2014		
35=	Wascana Energy Building		10	1990		
35=	Victoria Place	45 m (147 ft)	12	1954		
38	The Hamilton	44.8 m (146.9 ft)	14			
39	Agriculture Place	42 m (138 ft)	10	2015		Tower two of the FCC complex built in 1992.
40	Canada Life Building		10	1993		
41	Centre Square Place	36 m (118 ft)	11	2014		

== Timeline of tallest buildings ==
History of the tallest buildings in Regina
Period	Building	Height	Floors	Image
1912-1927	Saskatchewan Legislative Building; Government	53 m (174 ft)	3	
1927-1969	Hotel Saskatchewan; Hotel	55 m (180 ft)	14	
1969-1976	Avord Tower; Office	64 m (210 ft)	16	
1976-1979	Regina City Hall	68 m (223 ft)	16	
1979-1988	C.M. Fines Building	79 m (259 ft)	20	
1988–2013	Delta Regina Hotel	83.8 m (275 ft)	25	Delta Regina hotel
2013–present	Mosaic Potash Tower	84.5 m (277 ft)	20	

== Projects ==
List of high-rise buildings under construction, approved, proposed and on-hold in Regina.

Building	Height	Floors	Year	Status	Notes
11th and Lorne Tower One		17	2017	Proposed	
11th and Lorne Tower Two		17	2017	Proposed	

== See also ==
- Canadian Centre for Architecture
- Society of Architectural Historians
- Canadian architecture
- List of tallest buildings in Canada
- List of tallest buildings in Winnipeg
- List of tallest structures in Saskatchewan
