= Avord (disambiguation) =

Avord is a commune in the Cher department of central France.

Avord may also refer to:

- Avord Air Base, of the French Air and Space Force, in the commune
- Canton of Avord, an administrative division containing the commune
- Avord Tower, an office block in Regina, Saskatchewan, Canada
