= Chateau Qu'Appelle =

Unfinished hotel in Saskatchewan, Canada

- Artist's 1915 sketch of Chateau Qu'Appelle Hotel
- Interactive map of the Chateau Qu'Appelle area

General information
- Type: Hotel
- Architectural style: Scots baronial style
- Coordinates: 50°26′23.76″N 104°37′1.08″W
- Construction started: c. 1913
- Demolished: c. 1922

Technical details
- Floor count: 10 (planned)

Design and construction
- Architect: Ross and Macdonald

The Chateau Qu'Appelle was a Grand Trunk Pacific Railway hotel planned for Regina, Saskatchewan. Construction was started in 1913 at the corner of Albert Street and 16th Avenue (now College Avenue). Rising costs, labour and material shortages, and the bankruptcy of the railway stopped the project before it was completed. The unfinished structure was eventually dismantled.

== History ==
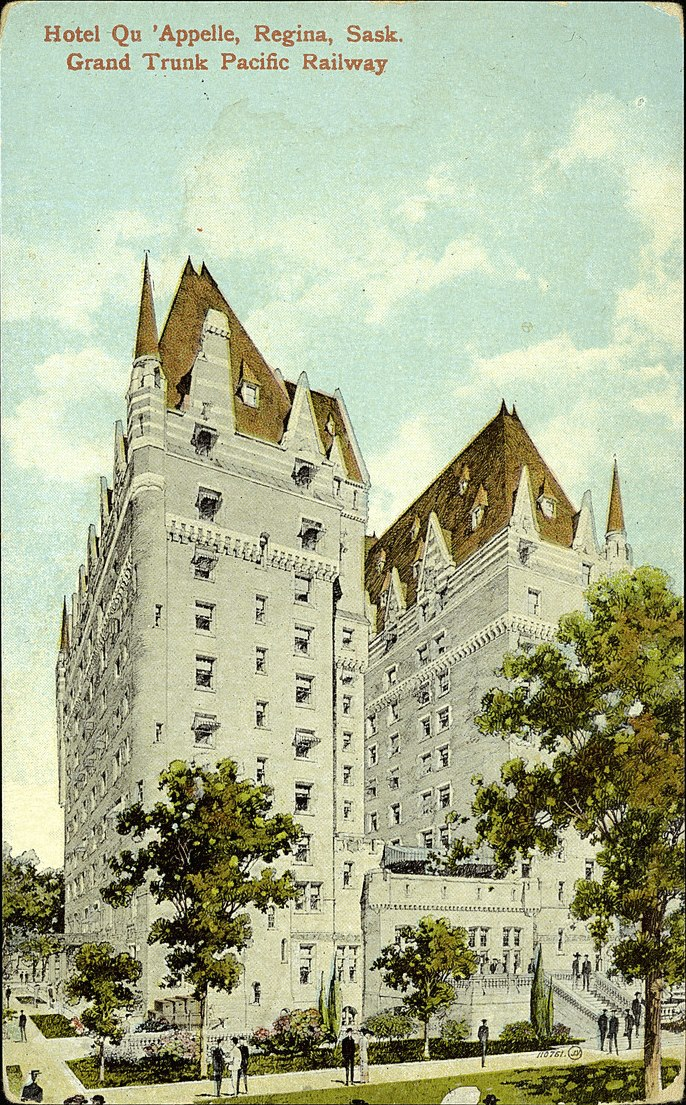
Postcard of the building-in-progress published and distributed in or about 1913.

Designed in the Scottish baronial style, the concrete pilings were sunk in 1913 to support the ten-storey structure. As well, there were two sub-storeys of reinforced concrete basement under the northwest corner of Wascana Park. The hotel's girders were already up when construction was halted – World War I had broken out, and the combination of labour shortages and material rationing meant that the lavish hotel's construction would be delayed until after the war.

However, construction never resumed; in 1919, the Grand Trunk Pacific Railway went bankrupt. The Canadian National Railway, a government-owned venture, eventually acquired the GTP's lines, but the construction project was never completed. For ten years, the five-storey-high steel skeleton of the Chateau Qu'Appelle became an embarrassing eyesore for the city. The land was eventually given back to the city, and the girders were dismantled. The steel beams from the project were eventually used in the construction of Regina's new lavish railroad hotel, the Hotel Saskatchewan. Other building materials intended for the hotel had also been used to construct two houses for James Kirkpatrick, superintendent of the Grand Trunk's station on College Avenue.

The Royal Saskatchewan Museum, built to celebrate the province's 50th anniversary and opening in 1955, now stands on the site of the ill-fated Chateau Qu'Appelle Hotel. Partly for aesthetic reasons and partly to avoid the expensive task of uprooting the pilings, the museum was built on an angle with a large front lawn covering the basement of the ill-fated hotel.
