= Saskatchewan Power Building =

Building in Regina, Saskatchewan

Coordinates: 50.446843°N 104.610116°W

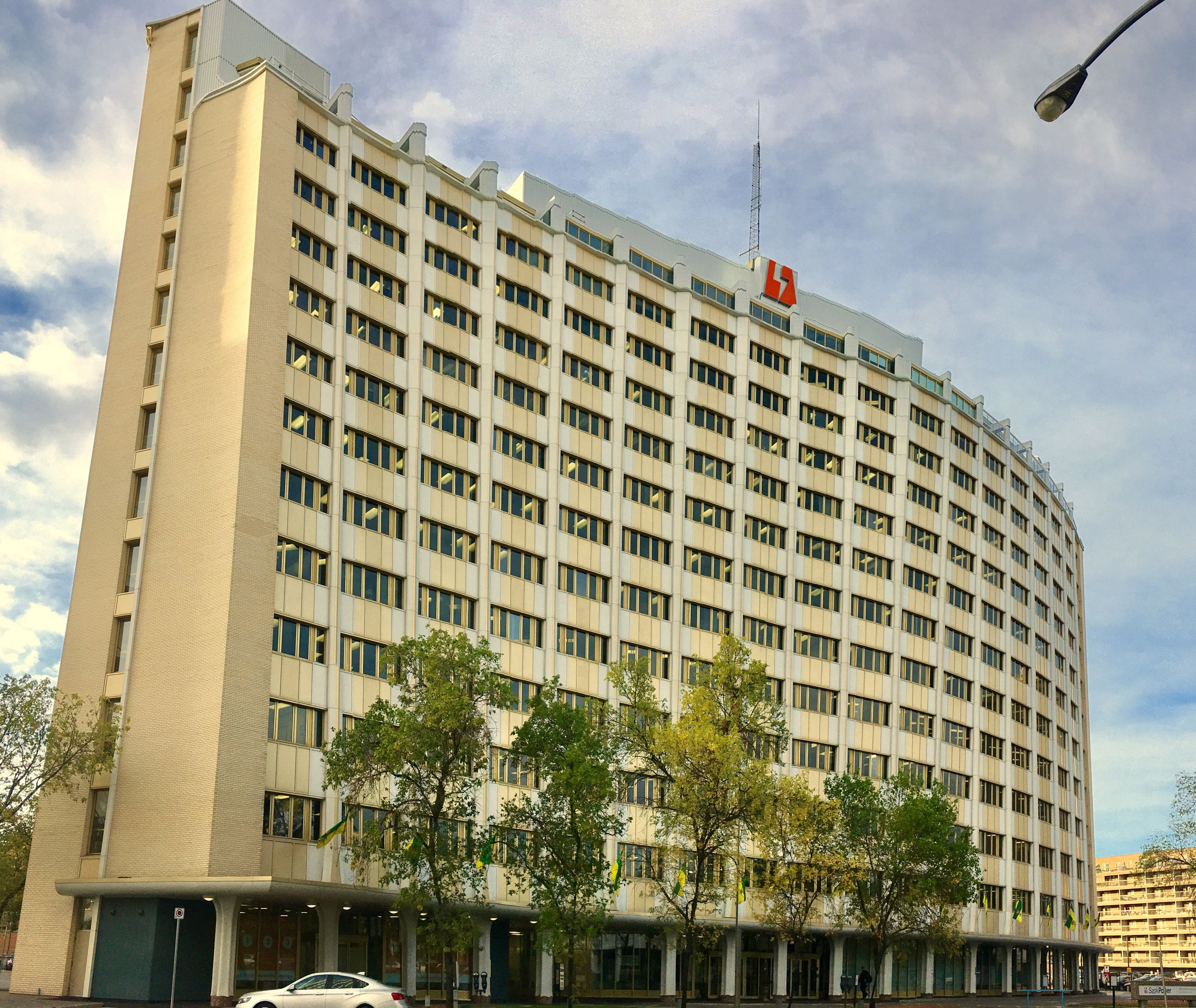

General information
- Location: 2025 Victoria Avenue, Regina, Saskatchewan
- Completed: 1963

Technical details
- Floor count: 14

Design and construction
- Architect: Joseph Pettick

The Saskatchewan Power Building is a 14-storey office building in Regina, Saskatchewan. Designed by architect Joseph Pettick and completed in 1963, it is Regina's best example of modern architecture. At the time of its completion it was the tallest building in Regina, and would remain so until 1967 when the Avord Tower surpassed it at sixteen stories.

== History and design ==
In 1955 Joseph Pettick (1924–2010) left the firm Portnall and Stock and formed his own practice. Pettick's first building was an office located at 2146 Albert Street, built for a steel pipe company. At the sod-turning ceremony Pettick met David Cass-Beggs, the head of the Saskatchewan Power Corporation. During their conversation Cass-Beggs mentioned that the company was thinking of constructing a new office to consolidate their staff.

After meeting Cass-Beggs on several occasions at art events in the city over the next few months, Pettick received a phone call one evening and was told that he had been selected to design the new office for the Saskatchewan Power Corporation. Over the next few years Pettick worked with the company to design and build the new office tower, which finally opened in 1963.

The Saskatchewan Power Building is an early example of the turn away from Internationalism towards Post Modernism. In lieu of the right angles and rectilinear forms of the former style, Pettick employed flowing curvature and a less formal order. One of the greatest influences on Pettick's design was Brazilian architect Oscar Niemeyer, and specifically Niemeyer's Edifício Copan in São Paulo. The Saskatchewan Power Building is also one of the first examples of a new Canadian prairie style of architecture, which would be further developed over the next two decades by architects such as Douglas Cardinal and Peter Hemingway. Pettick chose to colour the building a light tan, similar to that of a prairie field. From above, the curvature of the building can also be seen as symbolic of wind-blown wheat.

== Filmography ==
The Saskatchewan Power Building was the topic of an episode of the two-season DVD series Edifice and Us (2009).
