= The View on Fifth =

- Interactive map of the The View on Fifth area

General information
- Type: Residential
- Location: 320 Fifth Avenue North; Saskatoon, Saskatchewan, Canada
- Coordinates: 52.1318449°N 106.6563517°W
- Completed: 1968

Height
- Roof: 67.1 m (220 ft)

Technical details
- Floor count: 22
- Lifts/elevators: 2

Design and construction
- Developer: Viking Developments (2008 redevelopment)

The View on Fifth, formerly the Milroy Apartments, is the fifth-tallest building in Saskatoon, Canadian province of Saskatchewan, and located in the Central Business District. The building was originally constructed as rental units in 1968.

== Condo conversion controversy ==
In 2008, the Milroy Apartments building was sold by Kabo Developments to Viking Developments, who applied to the city for permission to convert the building into condominia. Because of the large number of senior citizen tenants who could not afford to purchase condominium units, the proposed conversion generated a public outcry. As a result, the developer agreed to retain ownership of 40 of the 156 units to be rented out to existing tenants for the following four years.

Following the approval of the conversion by the city council, residents tried unsuccessfully to block it in the courts. The residents withdrew their appeal, settling with the developer under the condition that some long-term residents would receive lifelong leases at prevailing market rates.

== Post-conversion ==
The building was renovated at a cost of CDN $6 million and was renamed The View on Fifth. Some of the units are rented out by Premium Executive Suites as extended-stay hotel suites.

== See also ==
- List of tallest buildings in Saskatoon
