= Hotel Saskatchewan =

Building in Saskatchewan, Canada

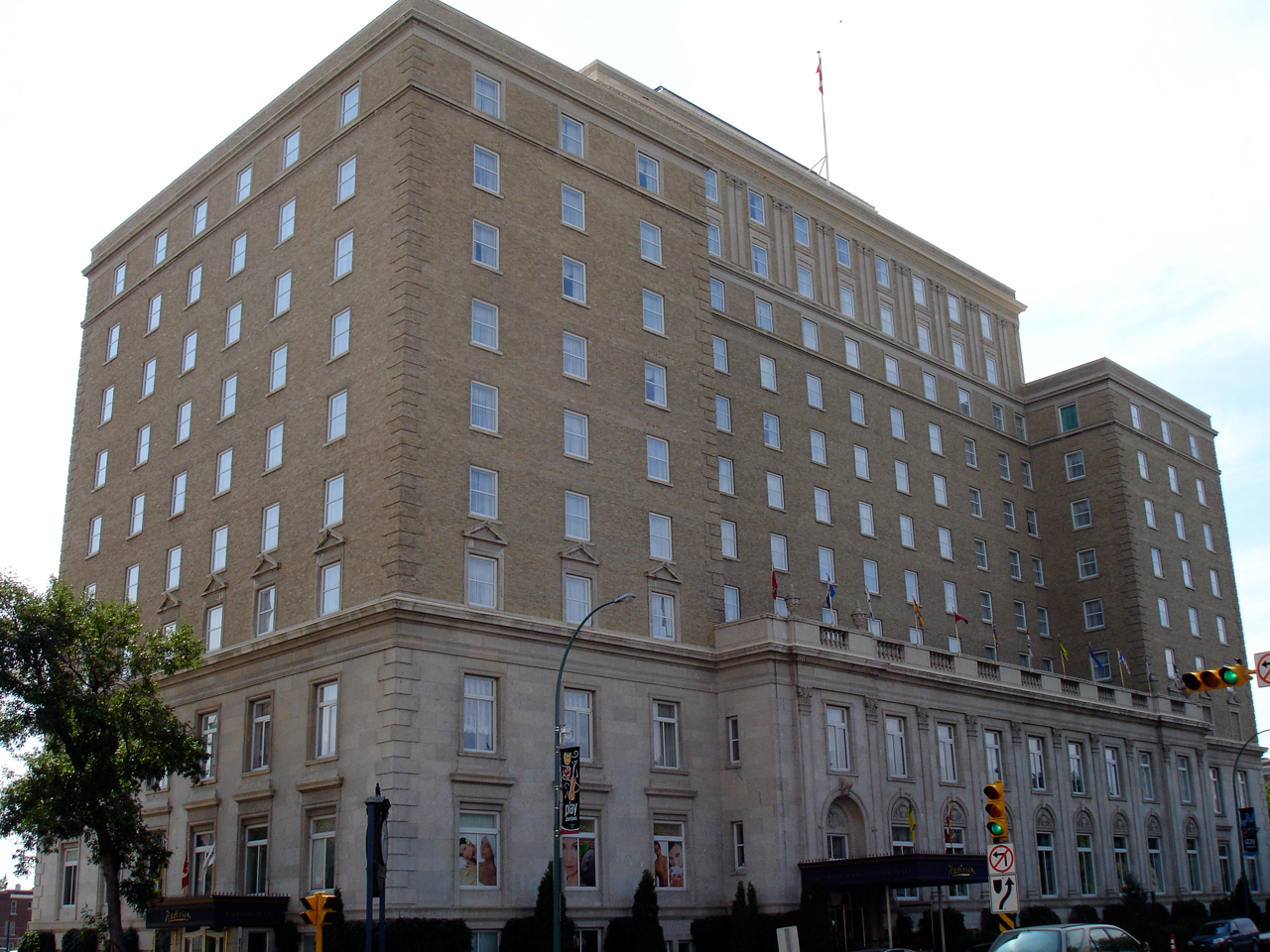
- Hotel Saskatchewan

- Location within Saskatchewan
- Hotel chain: Autograph Collection

Record height
- Tallest in Regina, Saskatchewan from 1927 to 1969^{[I]}

General information
- Location: Regina, Saskatchewan, Canada
- Coordinates: 50°26′48″N 104°36′41″W
- Opening: 1927
- Operator: Marriott International

Technical details
- Floor count: 10

Design and construction
- Architect: Ross and Macdonald
- Developer: Canadian Pacific Railway

Other information
- Number of rooms: 224
- Number of suites: 27
- Number of restaurants: 1

Website
- http://www.marriott.com/hotels/travel/yqrak-the-hotel-saskatchewan/

The Hotel Saskatchewan is a historic hotel in downtown Regina, Saskatchewan, Canada, overlooking Victoria Park. Opened in 1927, it is one of Canada's grand railway hotels. It was the fourteenth hotel in a nationwide chain constructed and owned by the Canadian Pacific Railway, and today operates as part of the Marriott International chain.

== History ==
=== Chateau Qu'Appelle ===
A prior attempt at construction of a grand railway hotel for Regina, the Chateau Qu'Appelle, failed when its builders, the Grand Trunk Pacific Railway went bankrupt in 1919. The partially constructed hotel, at the corner of Albert Street and College Avenue remained derelict for years, until Canadian Pacific purchased the disused girders for use in the construction of the Hotel Saskatchewan, and the large excavation was finally filled. The foundations remained, however, substantially accounting for the positioning of the Provincial Museum (now the Royal Saskatchewan Museum).

=== Hotel Saskatchewan ===
The Canadian Pacific railway's earlier hotels, such as the Château Frontenac in Quebec City, the Chateau Lake Louise and the Banff Springs Hotel were designed in a distinctive château style, but by the late 1920s this had been largely abandoned, in favor of a much simpler and less expensive neoclassical style.

The hotel's opening in 1927 meant that Government House was no longer needed to accommodate official guests as it had previously done for visitors such as the future King George V and Queen Mary, who visited the then-Territories in 1901 as Duke and Duchess of Cornwall and York; Prince Arthur, Duke of Connaught, his wife and their daughter Princess Patricia in 1912, the Prince of Wales in 1927.

On February 19, 2014, Winnipeg-based Temple Hotels, owners of Moose Jaw's Temple Gardens, Saskatoon Inn and Regina's Wingate hotel, announced it would purchase Hotel Saskatchewan for $32.8 million and would undertake a three-year $6 million improvement campaign.

In July 2015, Toronto real estate investment firm InnVest REIT announced a deal to purchase the hotel for $37 million. As part of the sale, the hotel switched its affiliation from Radisson to Marriott's Autograph Collection chain.

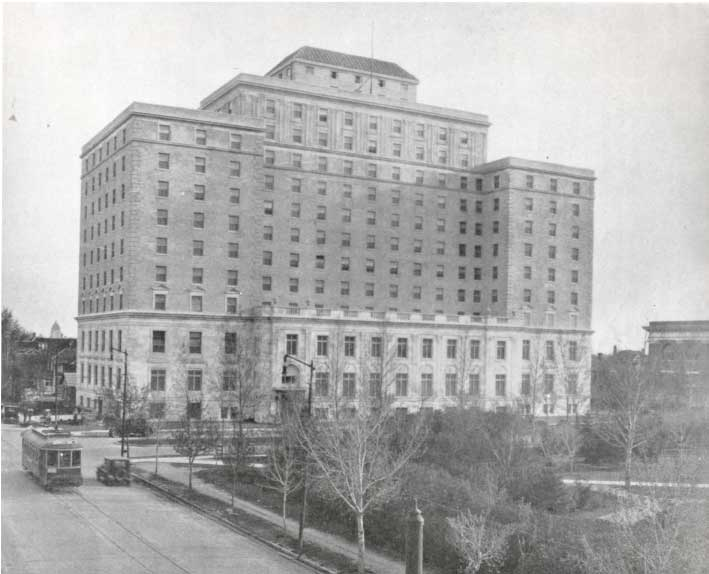
Hotel Saskatchewan, circa 1930

Artistic rendering of the planned and partially constructed Chateau Qu'Appelle

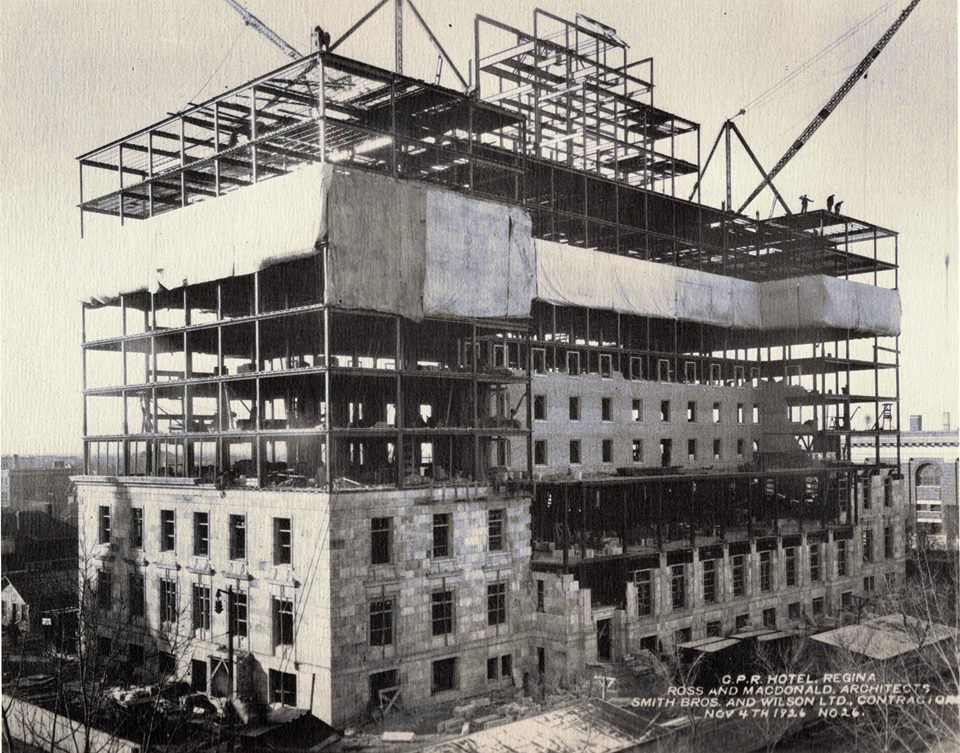
Hotel Saskatchewan under construction 1925

Preceded by Saskatchewan Legislative Building	Tallest Building in Regina; 1927-1969; 53 m	Succeeded by Avord Tower
