= Queen Elizabeth II Court (Regina, Saskatchewan) =

Regina City Hall
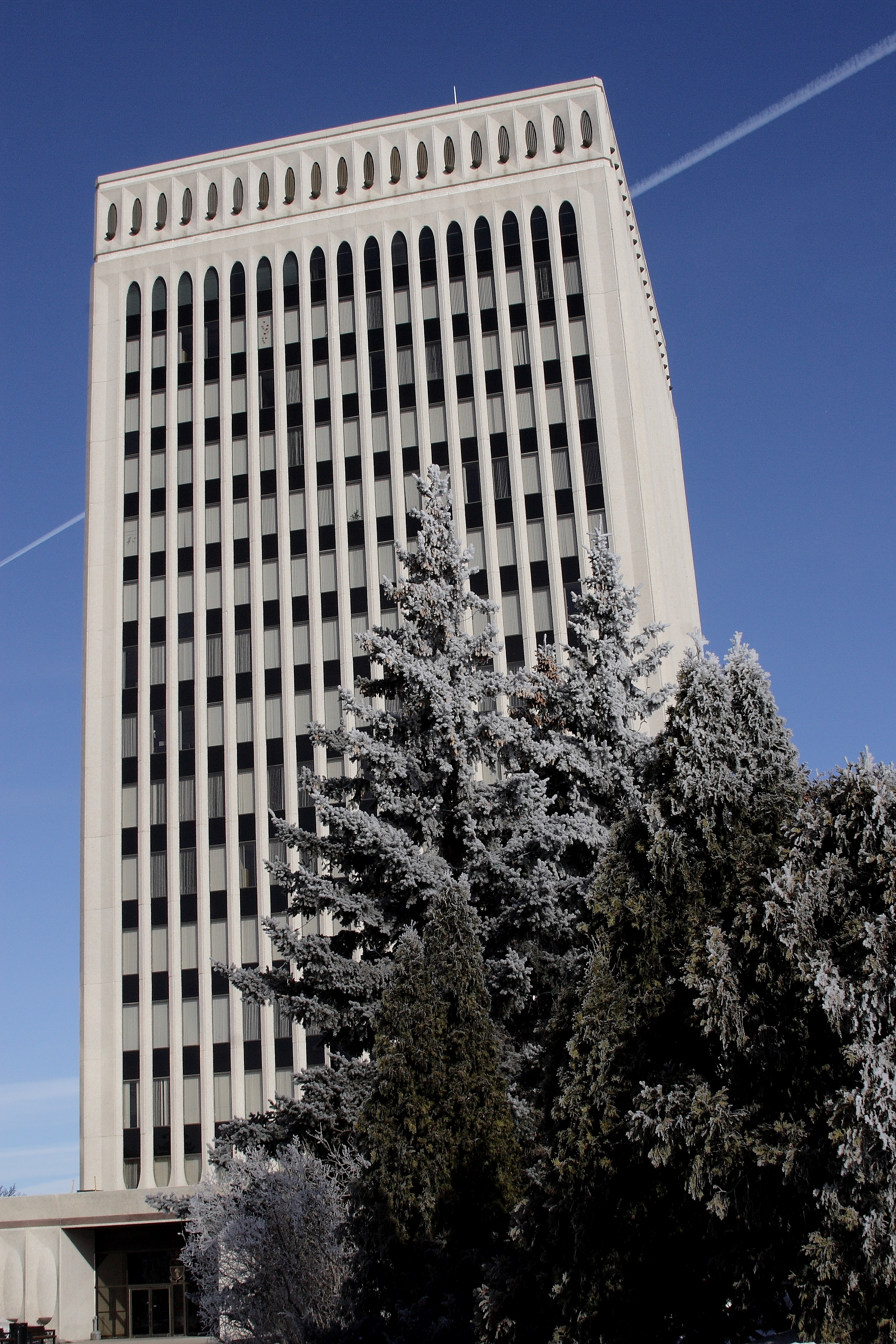
- Regina City Hall on Queen Elizabeth II Court
- Interactive map of the Regina City Hall area

General information
- Type: Office
- Location: 2476 Victoria Avenue; Regina, Saskatchewan; S4P 3C8
- Coordinates: 50°26′52″N 104°36′57″W
- Completed: 1976
- Opening: 1976
- Cost: CA$10.1 million
- Owner: City of Regina

Height
- Roof: 63.09 m (207.0 ft)

Technical details
- Floor count: 16

Design and construction
- Architect: Joseph Pettick

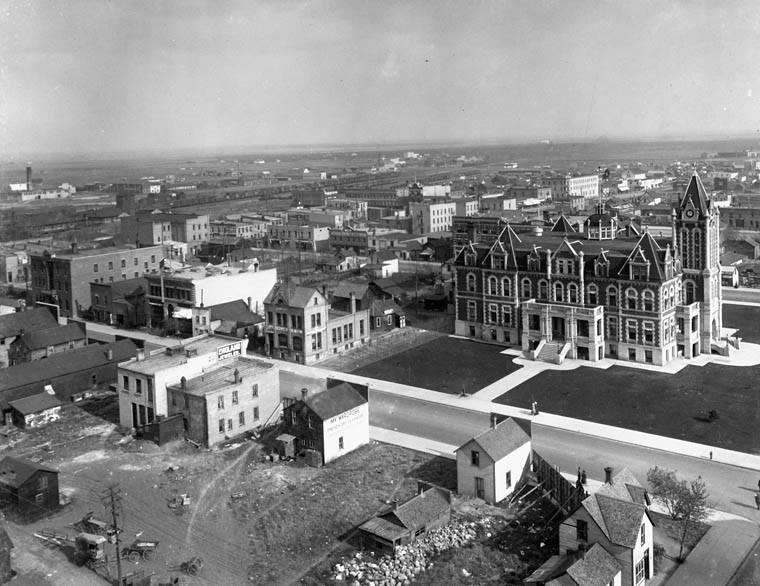
Newly built gingerbread City Hall in 1909.

Queen Elizabeth II Court is the city block containing Regina City Hall, a 16-storey office tower in Regina, Saskatchewan, Canada. The city hall is built in the International Style.

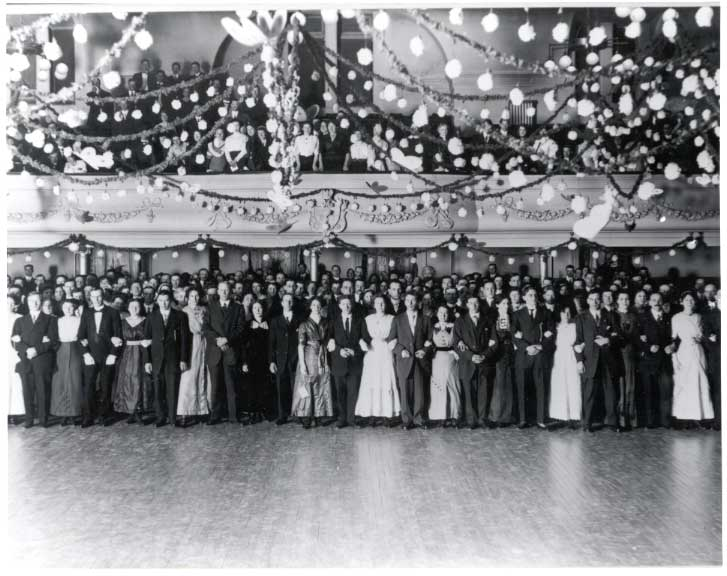
Ball held in gingerbread City Hall 1920 when other ballrooms did not exist and for which current City Hall was not required to have facilities for.

Opened in 1976, "[t]he construction manager was Poole Construction Limited and the architect, Joseph Pettick. It cost CA$10.1 million." It replaced two previous city halls—built in 1885-86 and 1908—and a temporary one in the old post office on 11th Avenue at Cornwall Street.

By the time the cornerstone was laid in 1906 for the second, the "gingerbread city hall," "[t]he wooden building which had served as Town Hall and as Regina's first City Hall was no longer sufficient for the city's needs. This is not surprising, since the tiny wooden building was used as City Chambers, the police station, the fire hall, a school, a public meeting hall and a banquet hall."

The 1908 building "was grand in scope and size, emphasizing the confidence city fathers saw in the future of the city. Built on 11th Avenue between Hamilton and Rose Streets (where the Alvin Hamilton Building housing Service Canada now stands), the new building was ornately decorated. It was often known as 'The Gingerbread Palace.' Constructed between 1906 -1908, it came into use in 1908 as a city hall, centre of arts, music and literature, and a banquet hall. Like its wooden predecessor, the massive stone structure was used for everything from lectures to dances – even boxing matches were held within its hallowed walls. However, by 1963, the revered old hall was showing its age and all civic offices were moved to the Old Post Office building. The building sat vacant for two years until it was demolished in 1965 to make room for the Midtown Centre shopping centre (subsequently redeveloped as the Galleria Shopping Centre then the Alvin Hamilton Building)."

The temporary city hall in the old post office (the "Prince Edward Building"), was used as a substitute from 1963 to 1975 for the city hall on 11th Avenue between Hamilton and Rose Streets, which had been closed and demolished without plans for any long-term replacement. It is most substantially used as theatre by Globe Theatre, Regina. The current City Hall does not contain or provide facilities for public social and ceremonial activities as its 1910 predecessor did, they not being available elsewhere in Regina then but now are. The current building is far more largely for office work.

The City of Regina in 2002 undertook an energy efficiency audit and environmental upgrade to the building.

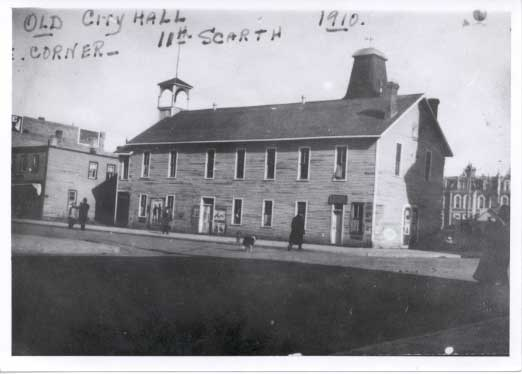
Original city hall on corner of Scarth Street and 11th Avenue. It was built in 1885-1886 and demolished after the "Gingerbread Hall" replaced it. That can be seen in the background, right.

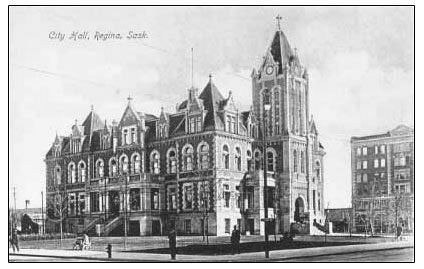
The 1908 "Gingerbread" City Hall, circa 1915. The now also-demolished Medical-Dental Building at 11th Avenue and Rose Street is visible to the right.

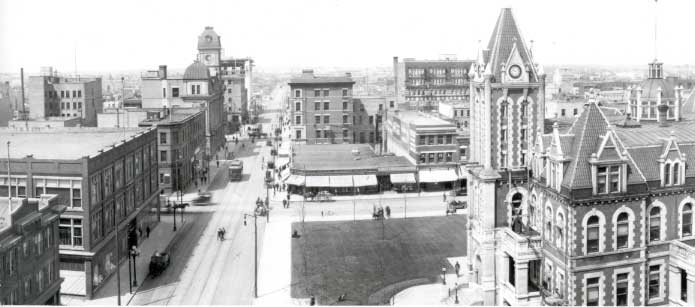
Looking west down 11th Avenue past the old Regina City Hall to the old post office, 1912.

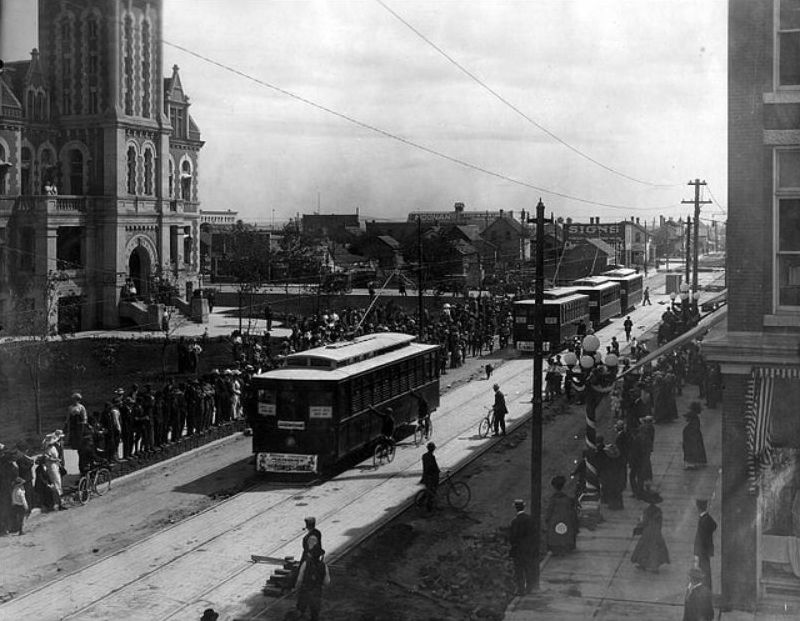
Inauguration of the Regina Municipal Railway in front of the City Hall on 11th Avenue, July 28, 1911.

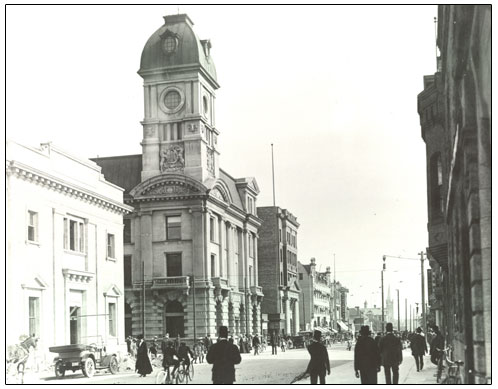
Old post office temporarily used as city hall from closure and demolition of "Gingerbread Hall" until building of current one

== See also ==
- Royal eponyms in Canada

Preceded by Avord Tower	Tallest Building in Regina; 1976-1979; 68 m	Succeeded by C.M. Fines Building
