= Delta Regina Hotel =

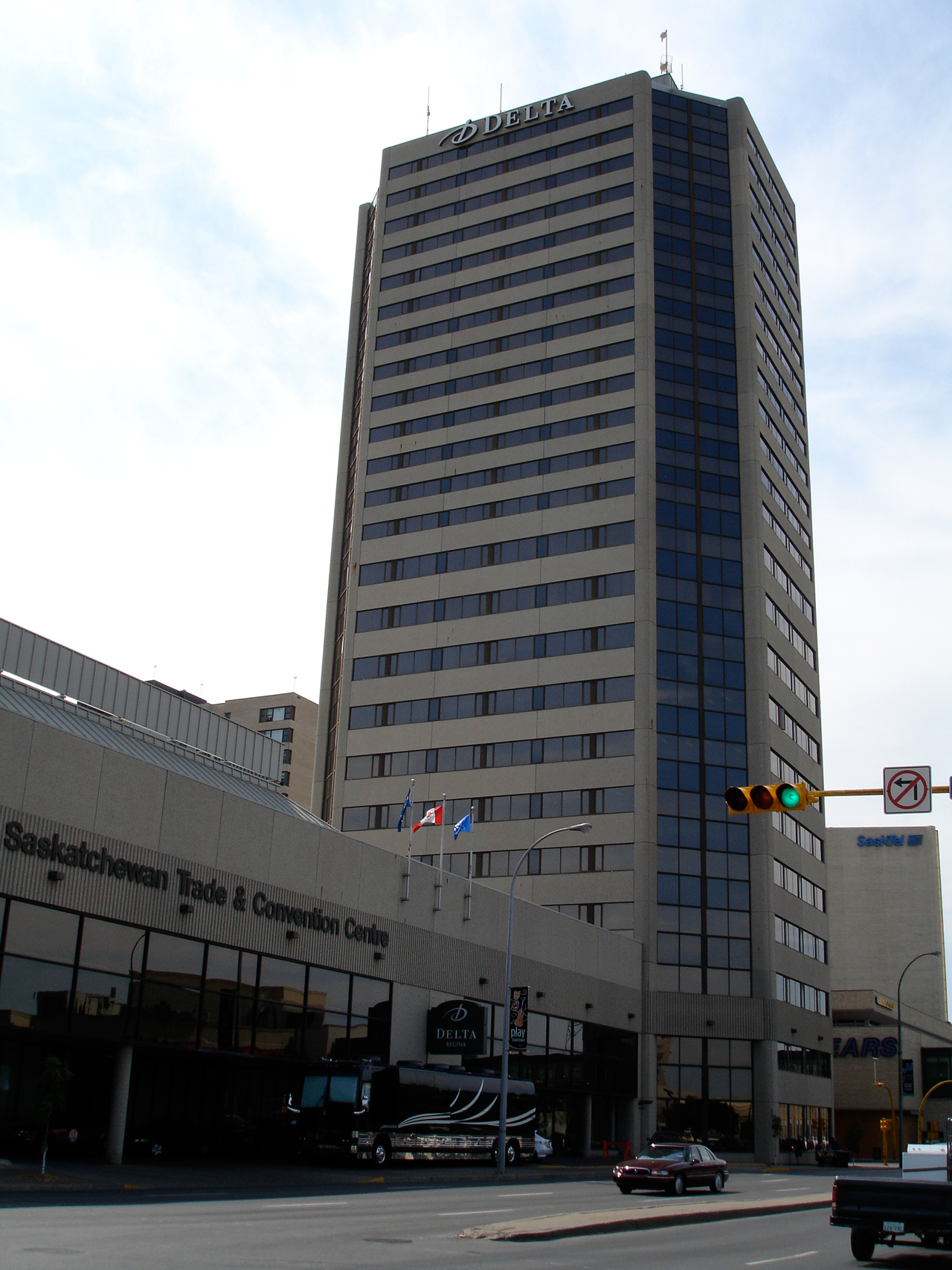
- Delta Regina Hotel in Downtown Regina
- Interactive map of the Delta Regina Hotel area

General information
- Type: Hotel/Office
- Location: 1919 Saskatchewan Drive; Regina, Saskatchewan; S4P 4H2
- Coordinates: 50.4518°N 104.6086°W
- Completed: 1988
- Owner: Delta Hotels

Height
- Roof: 83.8 m (275 ft)

Technical details
- Floor count: 25

Website
- www.marriott.com/hotels/travel/yqrdr-delta-hotels-regina/

Delta Regina Hotel is a hotel building located at 1919 Saskatchewan Drive in the Central Business District of Regina, Saskatchewan, Canada. The hotel contains 274 rooms and was completed in 1988; at 25 stories (83.8 m). The hotel opened as a Ramada Renaissance, but is now part of the Delta Hotels chain. Similar in design to Saskatoon's Radisson Hotel and La Renaissance Apartments.

The building is connected with the Saskatchewan Trade and Convention Centre, Casino Regina, Cornwall Centre shopping centre and Palliser Place seniors' highrise.

== See also ==
- List of tallest buildings in Regina, Saskatchewan

Preceded by C.M. Fines Building	Tallest Building in Regina; 1988-Present; 83.8 m	Succeeded by
