= C.M. Fines Building =

Office building in Regina, Canada

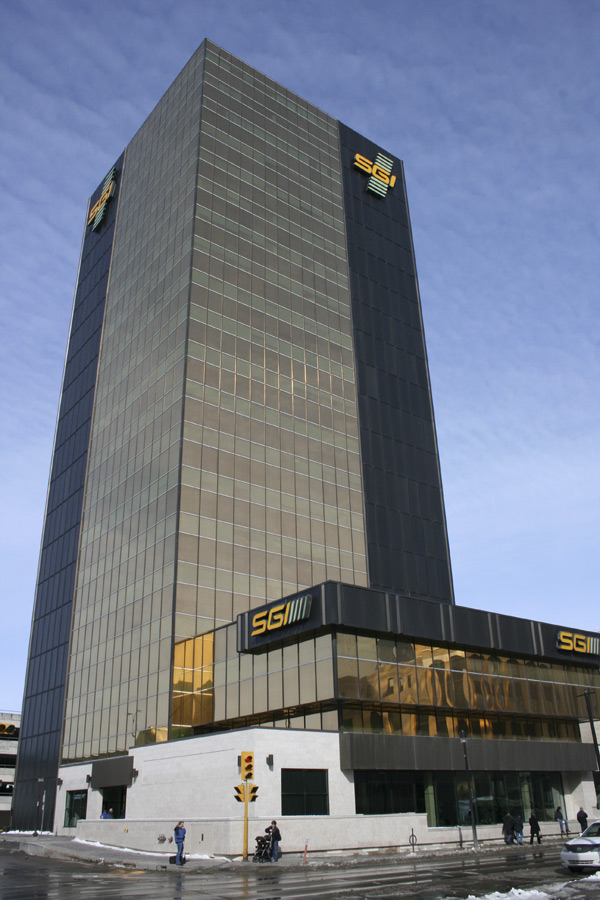
- Interactive map of the C.M. Fines Building area

Record height
- Tallest in Regina, Saskatchewan from 1979 to 1988^{[I]}

General information
- Type: Office
- Location: 2260 11th Avenue; Regina, Saskatchewan, Canada
- Coordinates: 50°27′2″N 104°36′48″W
- Completed: 1979

Height
- Roof: 79.00 m (259.19 ft)

Technical details
- Floor count: 20
- Lifts/elevators: 4

Design and construction
- Architect: Joseph Pettick

The C.M. Fines Building is a 20-storey office tower located at 2260 11th Avenue in Regina, Saskatchewan, Canada. The building was completed in 1979. The building was designed by Joseph Pettick and features unusual energy-efficient reflective windows containing gold dust, giving the building its distinctive colour. The building houses the corporate offices of Saskatchewan Government Insurance (SGI). The building is named after Clarence Melvin Fines, who was a Provincial Finance Minister in the 1940s and 50s and played a major role in establishing SGI. From 1979 until 1988, it was the tallest building in Regina.

The C.M. Fines Building has had a history of structural problems. In 2004, water damage to the building's post-tension cables necessitated a $3.9 million repair. In 2010, the building was evacuated when high winds damaged a piece of the exterior metal cladding, raising concerns that the glass panels, held in place by the metal, would come loose. In 2012, the Government of Saskatchewan released a tender for a new office building for SGI, with the intention to sell the C.M. Fines Building.

== See also ==
- List of tallest buildings in Regina, Saskatchewan

Preceded by Queen Elizabeth II Court, Regina	Tallest Building in Regina; 1979-1988; 79 m	Succeeded by Delta Regina Hotel
