= Avord Tower =

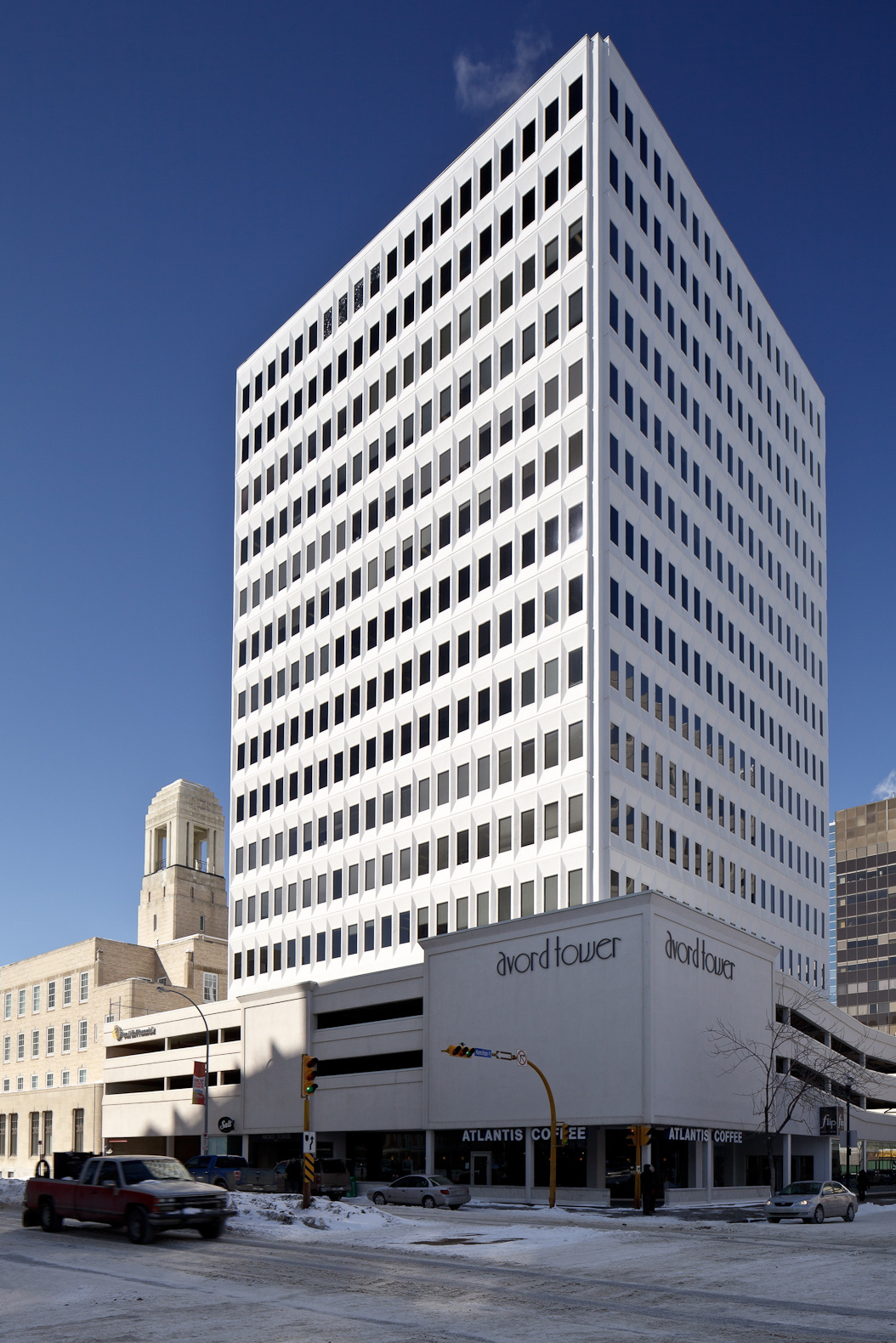
- Avord Tower in 2013
- Interactive map of the Avord Tower area

General information
- Type: Office
- Location: 2002 Victoria Avenue, Regina, Saskatchewan, Canada
- Coordinates: 50°26′50.86″N 104°36′35.32″W
- Completed: 1967

Height
- Roof: 55.17 m (181.0 ft)

Technical details
- Floor count: 16
- Lifts/elevators: 2

The Avord Tower is a 16-story office tower in Regina, Saskatchewan, Canada. The 16 story building was completed in 1967 and is an example of Modernist architecture. The Avord Tower stands on the site of the old North-West Territories Supreme Court building. From 1967 until 1976 this was the tallest building in Regina.

== See also ==
- List of tallest buildings in Regina, Saskatchewan

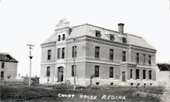
Supreme Court of the North-West Territories Courthouse, 2002 Victoria Avenue, c.1919.

Preceded by Hotel Saskatchewan	Tallest Building in Regina; 1969-1976; 55.17 m	Succeeded by Queen Elizabeth II Court, Regina
