= List of condominiums in Canada =

This is a list of articles of notable condominiums located in Canada.

== Residential condominiums ==
Absolute World	Mississauga	
Altitude Montreal	Montreal	
Altoria	Montreal	
Arriva Towers	Calgary	
Burano	Toronto	
Brentwood Village	Edmonton	The second condominium development in Canada (registered in Dec 1967)
Casa Condominio Residenza	Toronto	
Century Park	Edmonton	
CityPlace	Toronto	
Concord Pacific Place	Vancouver	
Concord Park Place	Toronto	
Electra Building	Vancouver	
Empress Walk	Toronto	
Fairbanks-Morse Warehouse	Saskatoon	
Habitat 67	Montreal	
Hallmark Place	Saskatoon	
Harbour Plaza	Toronto	
Ideal Lofts	Toronto	
L Tower	Toronto	
La Renaissance Apartments	Saskatoon	
L'Avenue	Montreal	
Le Sanctuaire du Mont-Royal	Montreal	
Le Triangle	Montreal	
Lépine Towers	Montreal	
Minto Metropole	Ottawa	
MThree	Coquitlam	
N3	Calgary	
Number One Bloor	Toronto	
The Palace Pier	Toronto	
The Park Mansion	Mississauga	
The Pearl	Edmonton	
Peel Condo Corp #1	Brampton	The first condominium development in Canada (registered in Nov 1967)
Pigott Building	Hamilton	
Pinnacle Centre	Toronto	
Ritz-Carlton Toronto	Toronto	
Roccabella	Montreal	
Rumely Building	Saskatoon	
Sir George Simpson	Montreal	
Sopa Square	Kelowna	
Station Square	Burnaby	
Ten York	Toronto	
TIFF Bell Lightbox	Toronto	
Tom Condos	Montreal	
Tour des Canadiens	Montreal	
The Gleneagles	Montreal	
Trump International Hotel and Tower	Vancouver	
Victoria Park Place	Windsor	
The View on Fifth	Saskatoon	
Waterpark City	Toronto	
Windsor Arms Hotel	Toronto	
YUL Condos	Montreal	

== Condo hotels ==
Name	City
Fairmont Pacific Rim	Vancouver
Four Seasons Hotel and Residences Toronto	Toronto
Living Shangri-La	Vancouver
One King Street West	Toronto
One Wall Centre	Vancouver
Pantages Tower	Toronto
Paradox Hotel Vancouver	Vancouver
Ritz-Carlton Montreal	Montreal
Ritz-Carlton Toronto	Toronto
Shangri-La Toronto	Toronto
The St. Regis Toronto	Toronto
Windsor Arms Hotel	Toronto

== See also ==
- List of condominiums in the United States
