= Lorne Webster =

Canadian businessman

Lorne Charles Webster
- Born: September 19, 1928; Montreal, Quebec, Canada
- Died: December 15, 2004 (aged 76); Westmount, Quebec, Canada
- Education: Lower Canada College
- Alma mater: McGill University (B.Eng.)
- Spouse: Meredith Evans

Lorne Charles Webster (September 19, 1928 – December 15, 2004) was a Canadian financier, businessman and philanthropist. He was the chairman and founder of Prenor Group Limited, a conglomerate with over $500 million in assets that had investments in insurance, trust services, investment management and real estate in Canada, the United States and Europe. He was also the co-owner and co-founder of the Montreal Expos.

== Early life and education ==
Webster was born in Montreal, Quebec, in 1928 and educated at Lower Canada College and McGill University. He started his career at his family's business, Canadian Import, a petroleum company.

== Career ==
Webster was a director of Bank of Montreal, Domtar, Murphy Oil, Québecor and Dale-Ross Holdings.

=== Real Estate ===
Webster was a longtime business partner of real estate investor René G. Lépine. In 1969, Webster and Lépine purchased the 140-unit apartment building Tour Horizon at 1212 Pine Avenue in Montreal for $3 million. The same year, they purchased the 181-unit apartment building Le Cartier Tower at 1115 Sherbrooke Street in Montreal from the Montreal Trust Company out of receivership for $6 million. Both buildings had high vacancies and were renovated extensively. In 1971, Lépine and Webster wanted to purchase the Van Horne Mansion, adjacent to Le Cartier, and were planning a $7 million office building development. Lépine purchased the Webster family's shares of Le Cartier Tower in 2005.

== Personal life ==
His paternal grandfather was Lorne Campbell Webster. His maternal grandfather was Charles Frosst, founder of the company that became Merck Frosst.
