= Sir George Simpson (condominiums) =

- Interactive map of the Sir George Simpson area

General information
- Status: Completed
- Type: Condominiums; Private offices
- Architectural style: Post-modern
- Location: 1485 Sherbrooke Street West, Montreal, Quebec, Canada
- Coordinates: 45.4976°N 73.5814°W
- Current tenants: 31 units
- Construction started: 2006
- Completed: 2010
- Management: Groupe Lépine

Height
- Roof: 48.75 metres (159.9 ft)

Technical details
- Floor count: 12
- Floor area: 11,148 square metres (120,000 ft^{2})
- Lifts/elevators: 2

Design and construction
- Architect: DCYSM Architecture & Design
- Developer: Rene Lépine Sr. (Groupe Lépine)

Le Sir George Simpson (also known as Sir George Simpson) is a Condominium Private offices located at Quebec, Canada. Construction started in 2006 and was completed in 2010. The Sir George Simpson project was developed by Rene Lépine Sr., Management Groupe Lépine.

During the pre- construction phase, Groupe Lépine allowed early customers to personalize unit sizes and floor plans.

Sir George Simpson houses the most expensive apartments in Quebec, with units selling for over $1,500 per square foot as of 2014 and was the first building in Montreal to sell for over $1,000 per square foot. In its pre- construction phase, units sold between $1 million and $5.2 million, further increasing costs to between $1.2 million and $7.2 million, and was exclusively represented by Sotheby's International Realty. The building officially sold out in 2011 at record prices.

In 2016, American actress Jennifer Lawrence lived in the building during the filming of a movie.
