= Olympic Village (Montreal) =

Coordinates: 45.568571°N 73.554647°W

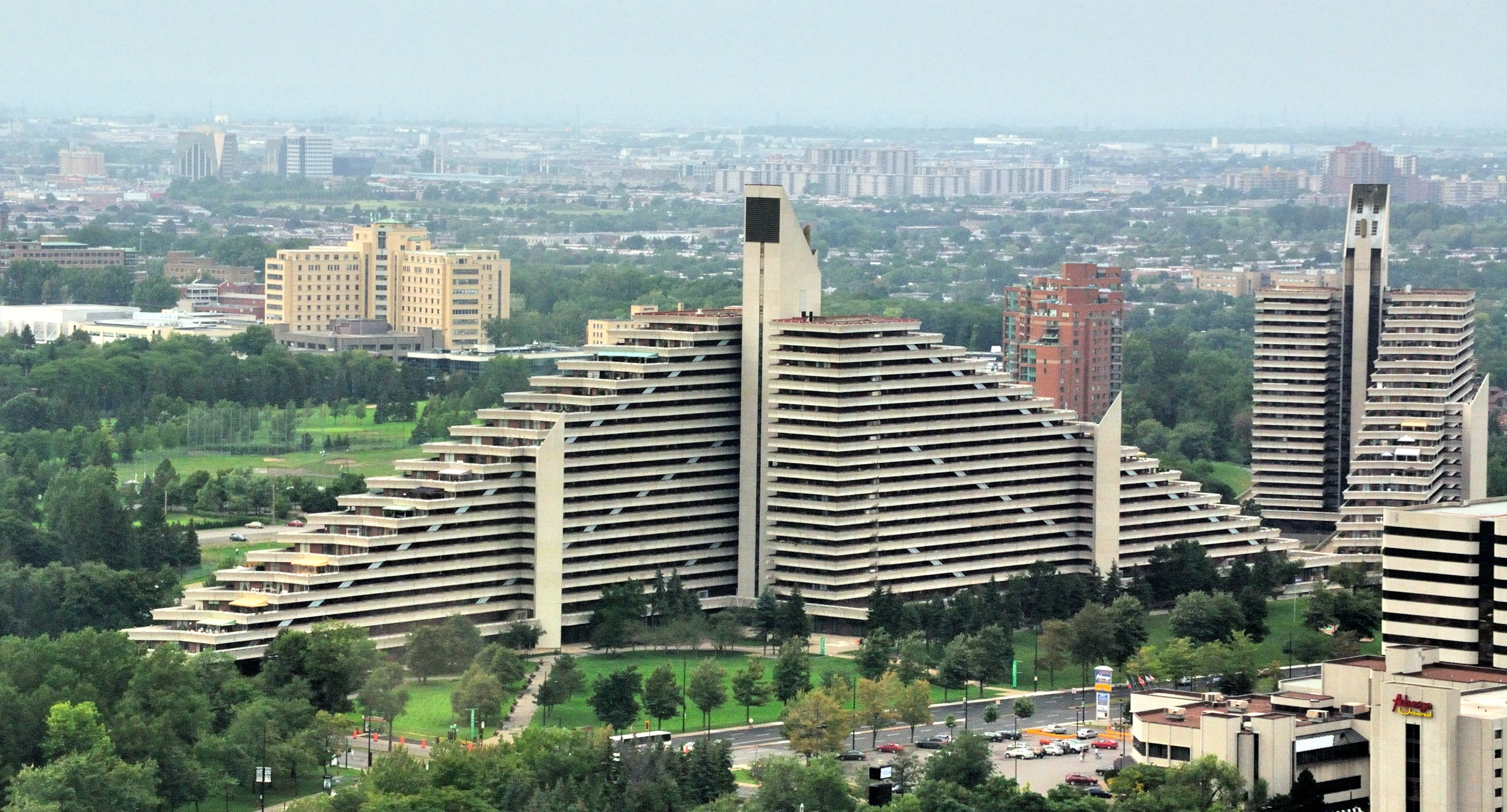
- Aerial view of the Olympic Village in 2008
- Interactive map of the Olympic Village area
- Alternative names: Le Village Olympique, Olympic Pyramids

General information
- Status: Completed
- Type: Athletic residences (originally) Residential, Offices (present)
- Location: 5111–5333 Sherbrooke Street East; Montreal, Quebec, Canada
- Construction started: 1974
- Completed: 1976
- Cost: $80 million (1976)
- Owner: Groupe Lépine/Zarolega Inc. (1976); Régie des Installations Olympiques (Quebec Government) (1976-1998); Metcap Living Inc. (1998-2004); El-Ad Group (2004-2012); CAPREIT (2012-present)

Technical details
- Floor count: 23 (each)
- Floor area: 34,800 square metres (375,000 sq ft)

Design and construction
- Architects: D'Astous & Durand
- Developer: Groupe Lépine

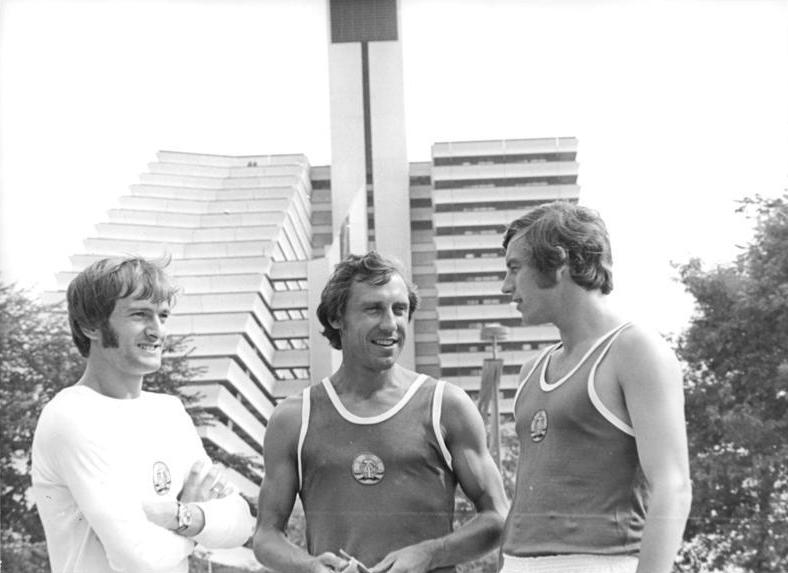
Athletes in front of Olympic Village, 1976 Summer Games.

The Olympic Village is a twin-tower structure in Montreal, Quebec, Canada, built as the athletes' residence for the 1976 Summer Olympics. Designed by architects Roger D'Astous and Luc Durand, it was built massively over budget by a consortium of architects, including Joseph Zappia, who was later convicted of fraud in connection with his involvement with the building.

Construction was overseen by René Lépine, Chairman of Groupe Lépine, and his associates through the company Zarolega Inc. Construction overruns were so drastic that the Olympic Installations Board seized the complex after its original estimate of $30 million ballooned to $90 million.

The Olympic Village is situated in Rosemont–La Petite-Patrie, with the entrance on the northeast corner of Sherbrooke Street East and Viau Street and the building extending along Sherbrooke Street as far as Assomption Boulevard. Its design was chosen by Mayor Jean Drapeau to imitate a similar structure in the south of France and was criticized for its exposed walkways, as some noted that they were unsuitable for a winter climate.

All the Olympic athletes were housed there, except those participating in equestrian sports and sailing, who were housed in residences set up in Bromont, Quebec, and Kingston, Ontario.

The Régie du logement has an office and court rooms on the ground floor.

In 1998, Metcap Living Inc. bought the buildings from the Régie des Installations Olympiques for $64.5 million. In 2004, El-Ad Group bought the buildings from Metcap Living Inc.

In 2012, El-Ad Group expressed their interest to sell the buildings. On August 6, 2012, it was reported that El-Ad had sold the buildings to CAPREIT for $177.5 million.

== See also ==
- List of Olympic Villages
