= Tribunal administratif du logement =

Government agency of Quebec

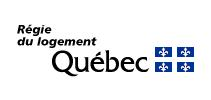
Organisation's logo

The Régie du logement du Québec (RDL) is an agency of the Government of Quebec, which governs relations between the owners of homes and their tenants. It was created in 1974 and its main offices are in the Olympic Village (Montreal). On September 1, 2020, the Régie du logement du Québec was renamed to the Tribunal administratif du logement du Québec (TAL).

The Board is responsible for dealing with disputes between landlords and tenants and has exclusive jurisdiction to hear cases relating to leases residential worth less than $70,000 .

It acts as a specialized tribunal to rule on rent increases, lease conditions, noise, heating, repairs, and lease terminations. It bases its decisions on the particular provisions of the Act respecting the Régie du logement and the Civil Code of Québec.

It publishes a series of forms of lease - whose use is mandatory since September 1996 and previously published a series of recommendations on the average increase in rents for one year.

Tenants can ask the Tribunal for the correct amount of a rent increase if the number is in dispute, a legally binding decision will be made in the interest of both parties. The rent increase for the year 2023, was announced to be 2.3% to 9.5%, depending on the evidence submitted to the Tribunal. The legal form for a Reply to an increase in rent is also on the Tribunals website, the original must be photocopied and sent by registered mail.

Each year, the board receives more than 800,000 requests for information from the public .

== See also ==
- Ontario Residential Tenancies Act, 2006
- Court of Quebec
