= List of tallest buildings in Saskatoon =

Tall buildings in Saskatoon
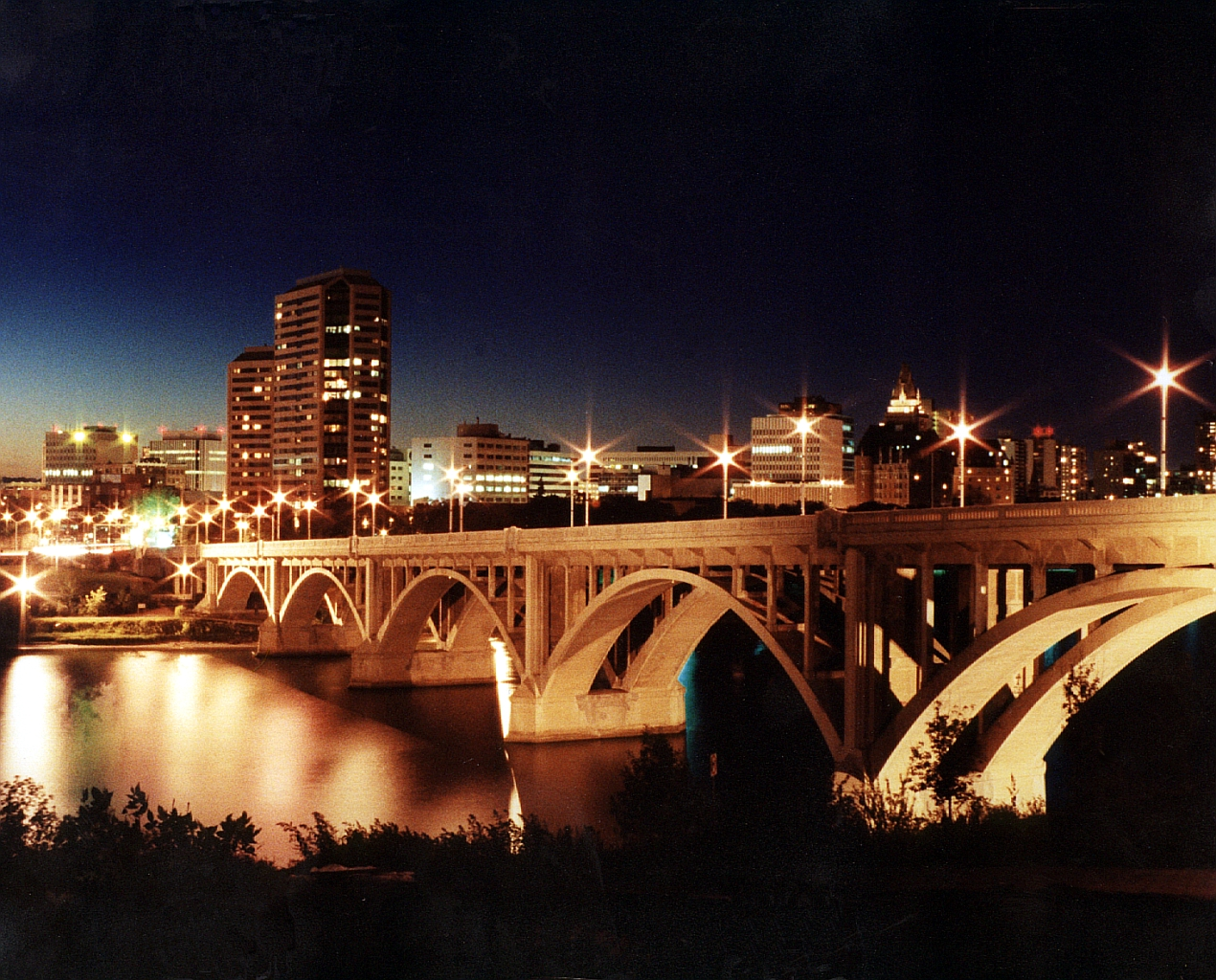
- Saskatoon skyline seen from across the South Saskatchewan River
- Tallest building: Nutrien Tower (2021)
- Tallest building height: 88.5 m (290 ft)

Number of tall buildings
- Taller than 50 m (164 ft): 24 (2025)

Saskatoon is the largest city in Saskatchewan, Canada. In Saskatoon, there are ten buildings that stand taller than 70 m (230 ft). The tallest building in the city is the Nutrien Tower at 88.5 m (290 ft) with 18 storeys. Upon completion, it became the tallest building in the province, replacing Regina's Mosaic Tower. The second-tallest is the 24-storey, 79.2-metre (260 ft) La Renaissance Apartments. The third-tallest building in the city is the Hallmark Place, standing at 78.8 m (259 ft) tall with 27 storeys.

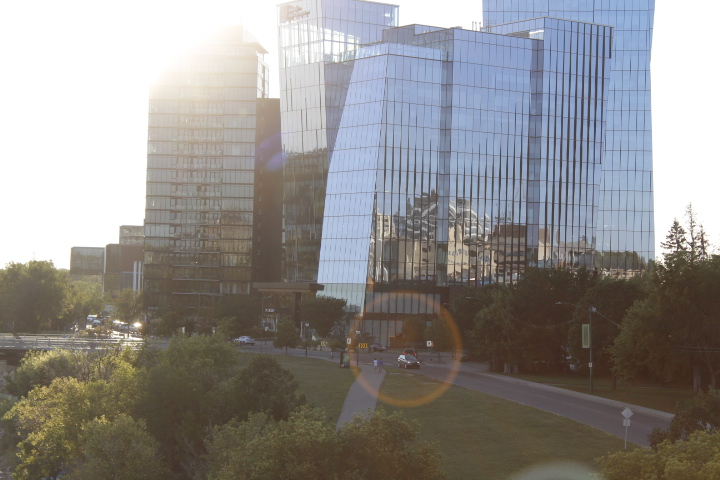
Saskatoon Skyline seen from Broadway Bridge

As of 2020, the city contains ten skyscrapers over 70 m (230 ft) and 44 high-rise buildings that exceed 35 m (115 ft) in height. As of June 2012, there were only 4 high-rises under construction, approved for construction, or proposed for construction in Saskatoon.

The Saskatoon skyline can be photographed from various angles; since the Delta Bessborough is one of the most distinct buildings it is common to photograph the skyline from the east shore of the South Saskatchewan River centered on the Bessborough.

== Buildings ==
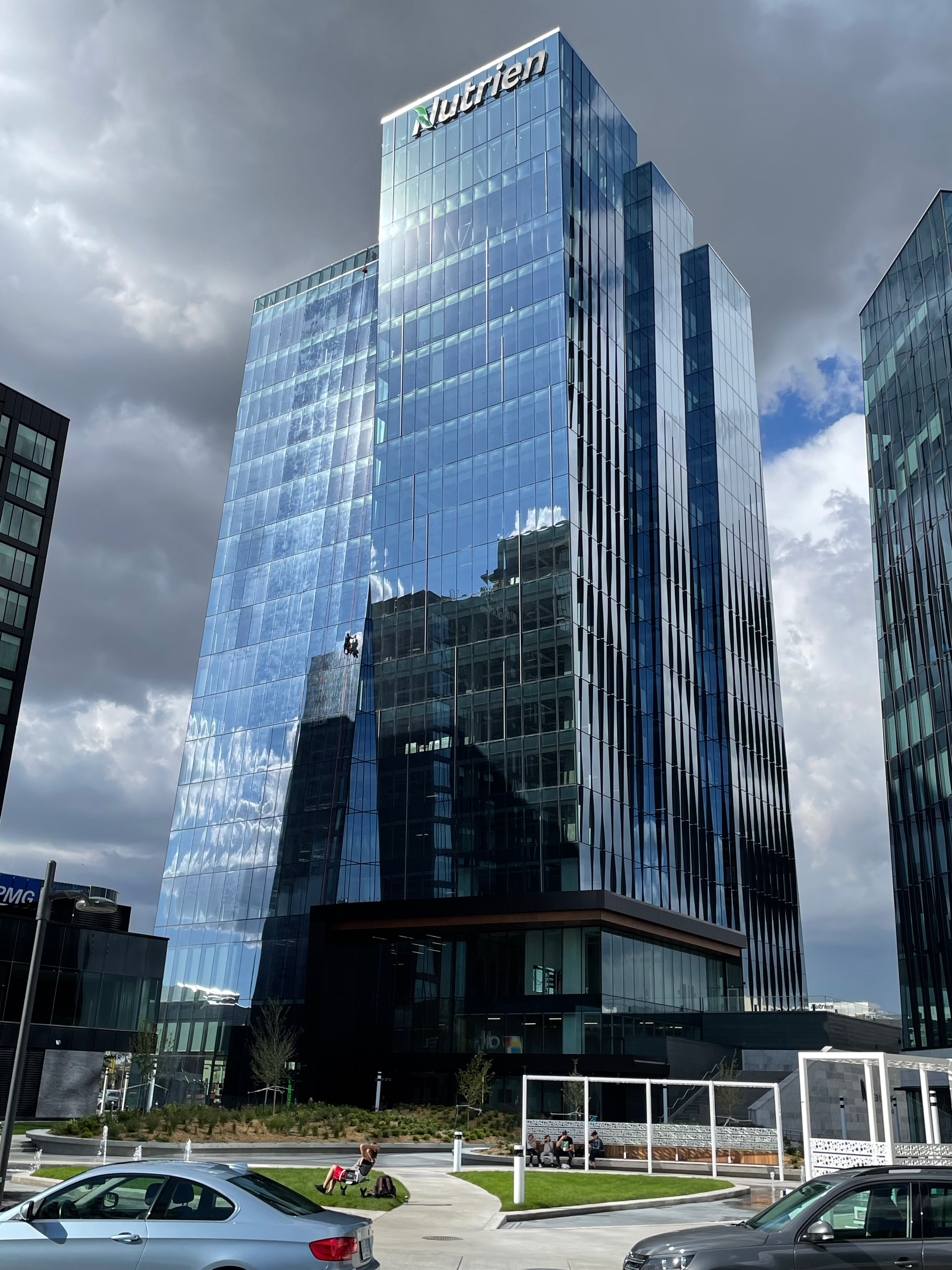
Nutrien Tower

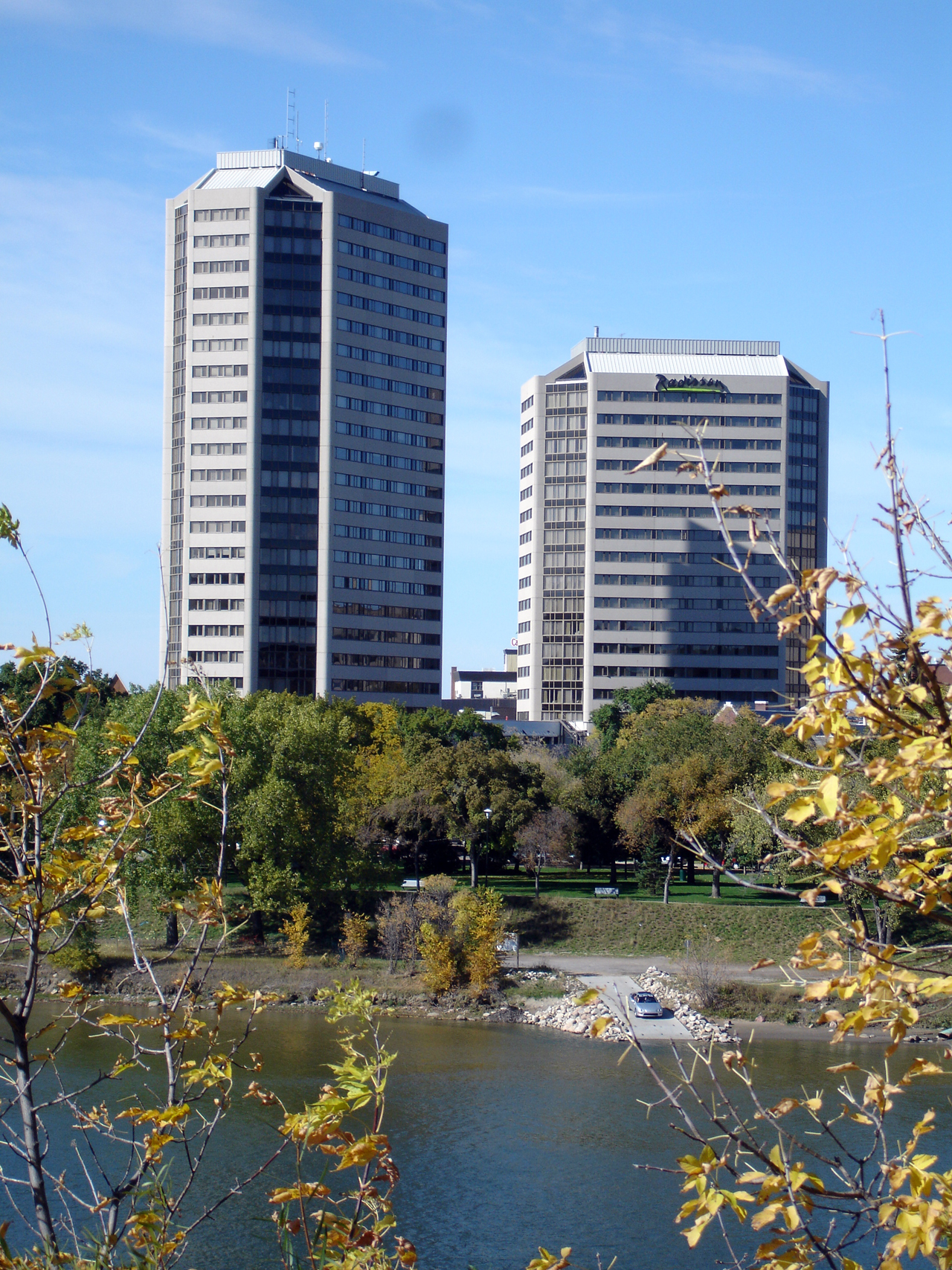
La Renaissance and Radisson Hotel towers

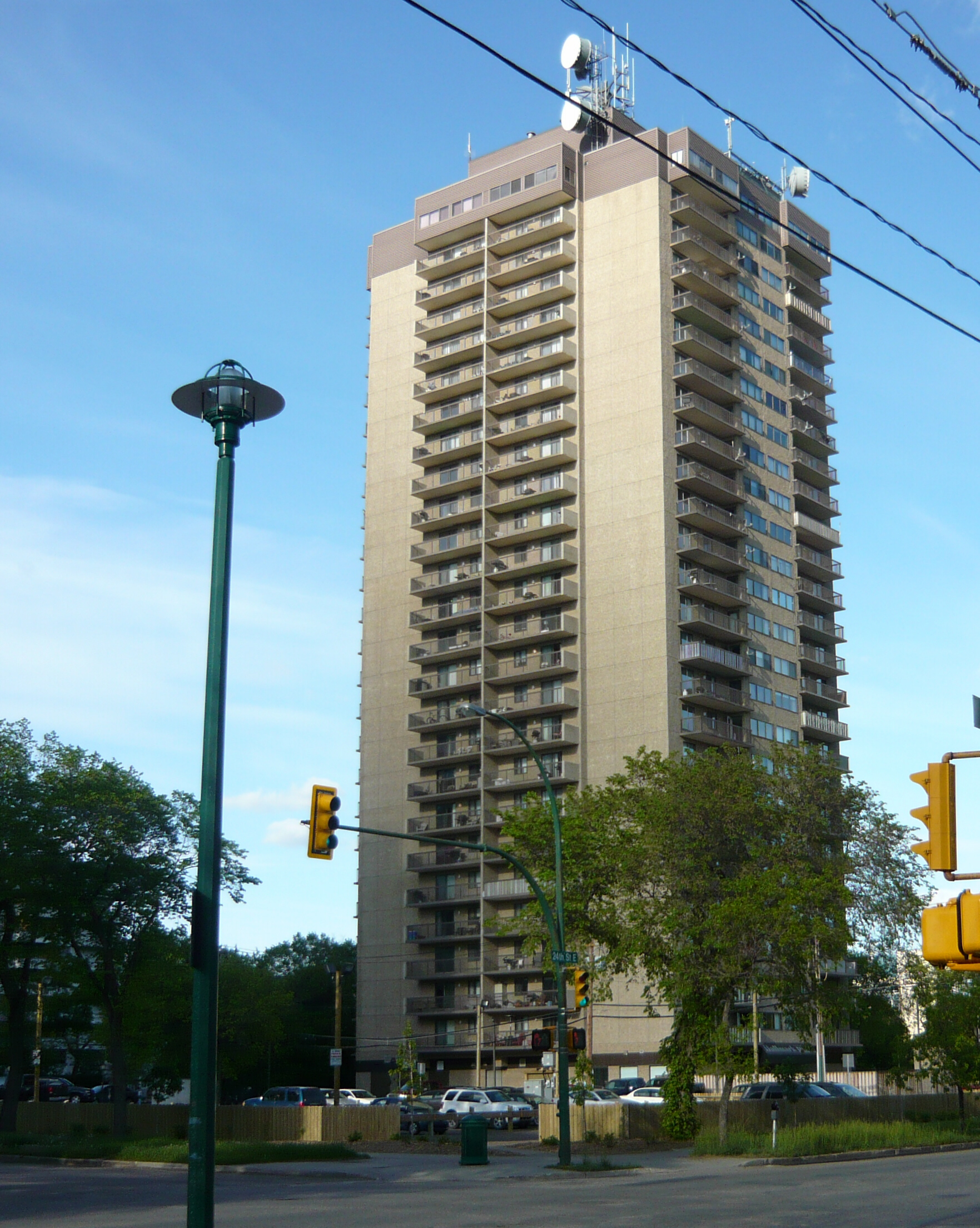
Hallmark Place

This list ranks buildings in Saskatoon that stand at least 48 m (157 ft) tall, based on CTBUH height measurement standards. This includes spires and architectural details but does not include antenna masts.

Tallest Buildings
Rank	Building	Address	Height	Floors	Completed	Notes
1	Nutrien Tower	19th St E	88.5 m (290 ft)	18	2021	Tallest building in Saskatchewan, and tallest building between Edmonton and Winnipeg.
2	La Renaissance Apartments	424 Spadina Cres E	79.3 m (260 ft)	24	1983	
3	Hallmark Place	311 6th Ave N	78.8 m (259 ft)	26	1984	
4	The Luther	1223 Temperance St	78 m (256 ft)	22	1978	
5	The View on Fifth (formerly Milroy Apartments)	320 5th Ave N	78 m (256 ft)	22	1968	
6	The Terrace Apartments	315 5th Ave N	78 m (256 ft)	22	1980	
7	Marquis Towers	241 5th Ave N	74.4 m (244 ft)	21	1966	
8	Carlton Towers	325 5th Ave N	74.4 m (244 ft)	21	1968	
9	Saskatoon Tower	125 5th Ave N	74.4 m (244 ft)	20	1979	
10	No 1 River Landing	3 Spadina Cres E	70.92 m (232.7 ft)	20	2019	
11	Ardent Mills (former Robin Hood Flour Mill)	95 33rd St E	65.5 m (215 ft)		1927	
12	Delta Hotels Saskatoon Downtown (formerly Radisson Hotel)	405 20th St E	63.8 m (209 ft)	18	1983	
13	Saskatoon Square	410 22nd St E	60.3 m (198 ft)	16-18	1979	
14	Shepherd Apartments	535 24th St E	60.3 m (198 ft)	17	1978	
15	RBC Tower (River Landing East Tower)	409 3rd Ave S	59.52 m (195.3 ft)	13	2019	
16	Delta Bessborough Hotel	601 Spadina Cres E	58.5 m (192 ft)	10	1932	
17	Westcliff Properties at 639 Main St	639 Main St	57.4 m (188 ft)	15	2023	
18	Midtown Tower (formerly CN Tower)	201 1st Ave S	56.9 m (187 ft)	12	1970	
19	Forget Towers	2503 Louise St	56.7 m (186 ft)	15/16		
20	Hilton Garden Inn Saskatoon Downtown	90 22nd St E	56.7 m (186 ft)	15/16		
21	Parkville Manor	625 25th St E	53.2 m (175 ft)	15	2005	
22	The Riverfront	902 Spadina Cres E	53.2 m (175 ft)	15	2007	
23	Fifth Avenue Place	439 5th Ave N	53.2 m (175 ft)	15	1981	
24	McClure Place	1825 McKercher Dr	53 m (174 ft)	15	1989	
25	Sturdy Stone Centre	122-124 3rd Ave N	48 m (157 ft)	13	1979	
26	The Franklin Revera	220 24th St E	48 m (157 ft)	14	1999	
27	Alt Hotel	200 Spadina Cres E	48 m (157 ft)	14	2019	
28	Spadina Towers	728 Spadina Cres E	48 m (157 ft)	14		
29	McNaughton Place	302 6th Ave N	48 m (157 ft)	14		
30	Seager Wheeler Hall	Aird St	48 m (157 ft)	14	1970	

== Timeline of tallest buildings ==
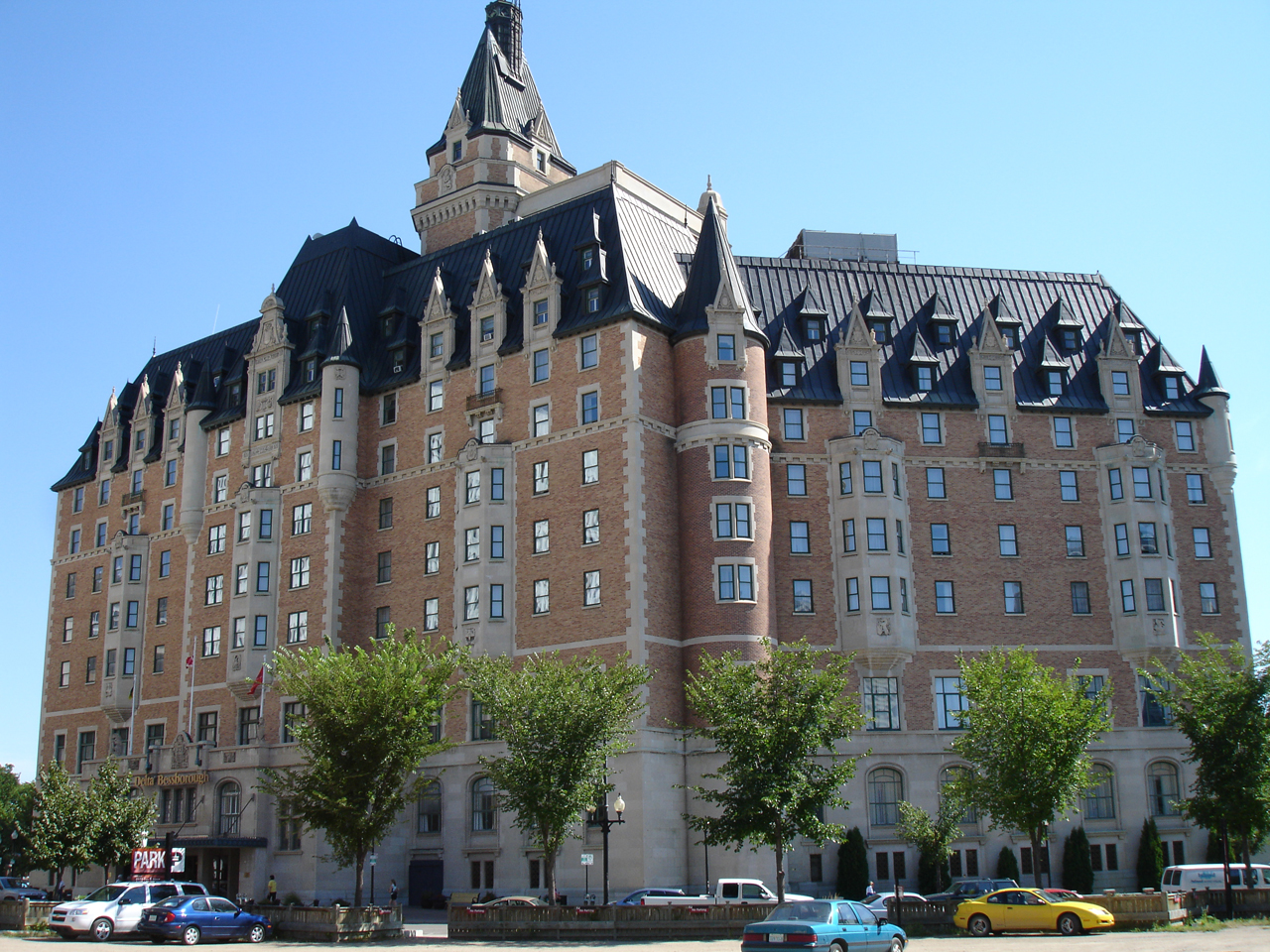
The Delta Bessborough, the tallest building in the city until 1966

Name	Street address	Years as tallest	Height m (ft)	Floors	Image
Canada Building	105 21st St E	1913–1932	35.05 m (115.0 ft)	8	
Delta Bessborough	601 Spadina Cres E	1932–1966	58.5 m (192 ft)	10	
Marquis Towers	241 5th Ave N	1966–1968	63 m (207 ft)	21	
The View on Fifth (formerly Milroy Apartment)	320 5th Ave N	1968–1979	66 m (217 ft)	22	
Saskatoon Square	410 22nd St E	1979–1983	72 m (236 ft)	17	
La Renaissance Apartments; Residential	424 Spadina Cres E	1983–2021	79.3 m (260 ft)	24	
Nutrien Tower	19th St E	2021–present	88.5 m (290 ft)	18	

== Tallest under construction, approved, proposed, and cancelled ==
This lists skyscrapers that are under construction, approved or proposed in Saskatoon, but are not yet completed structures.

Name	Height m / ft	Floors	Status	Notes
aodbt Architecture Tower	92.4 metres (303 ft)	22	Proposed	26 Storey mixed-use retail/residential, 555 Eastlake Avenue & 403 12th Street East
Baydo Towers 1 and 2	80 m (260 ft)	25	Under Construction	Twin 25 storey residential towers began construction on four level underground parking Summer of 2020, development completion planned for 2023, delayed until 2025.
Kindrachuk Agrey Unnamed Tower 1	110.35 metres (362 ft)	36	Proposed	36 Storey mixed-use retail/residential, 204 5th Avenue N
Kindrachuk Agrey Unnamed Tower 2	73.78 metres (242 ft)	24	Proposed	24 Storey mixed-use retail/residential, 204 5th Avenue N
Knox United tower	69 metres (226 ft)	19	Proposed	19 Storey mixed-use residential/commercial

== See also ==
- Canadian Centre for Architecture
- Society of Architectural Historians
- Canadian architecture
- List of tallest buildings in Canada
- List of tallest buildings in Regina
- List of tallest buildings in Winnipeg
- List of tallest structures in Saskatchewan
