= Église Notre-Dame-des-Champs de Repentigny =

Coordinates: 45.7211°N 73.4698°W

Église Notre-Dame-des-Champs
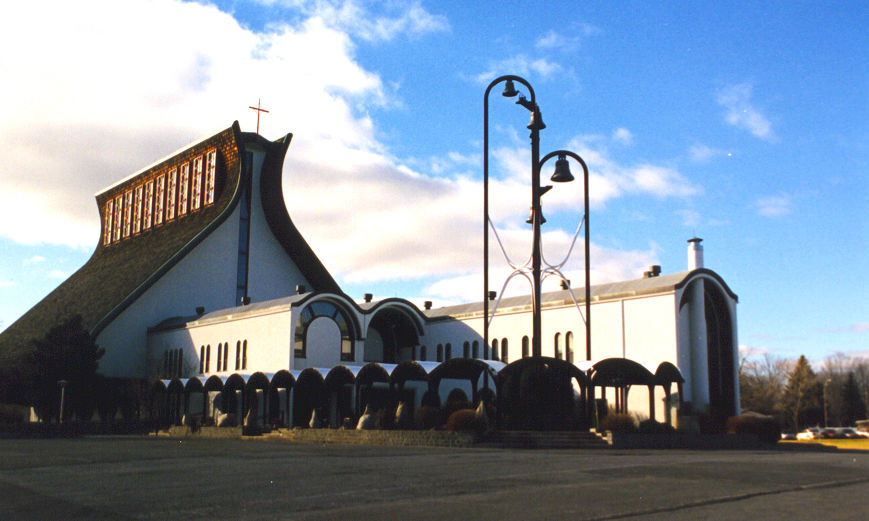
- Église Notre-Dame-des-Champs
- Location: Repentigny, Quebec
- Country: Canada
- Denomination: Roman Catholic
- Website: www.notre-dame-des-champs.org

History
- Status: Church

Architecture
- Functional status: Active
- Architect(s): Roger D'Astous; Jean-Paul Pothier
- Style: Modern
- Groundbreaking: 1962
- Completed: 1963

Administration
- Archdiocese: Montreal

Église Notre-Dame-des-Champs de Repentigny (French pronunciation: [eɡliz nɔtʁə dam de ʃɑ̃ də ʁəpɑ̃tiɲi]) is a church located in Repentigny, a suburb of Montreal, Quebec. It was completed in 1963.

The building was the work of architect Roger D'Astous (a student of Frank Lloyd Wright) and is located close to the previous church of the same name which was built in 1725.

The building has a statue of Christ on the cross which was sculpted by Médard Bourgault as well as a sculpture donated to the church by Rose-Anne Monna.

The church is nicknamed “The Bag” after its unusual shape, which is said to be fashioned after King David's lyre or praying hands.
