= Holland, Hannen & Cubitts =

Defunct building company based in London

- Industry: Construction
- Founded: 1810; 216 years ago
- Defunct: 1976
- Fate: Acquired
- Successor: Tarmac
- Headquarters: London, UK
- Key people: Lord Ashcombe (Chairman)

Holland, Hannen & Cubitts was a major British construction firm. It was responsible for many of the great buildings of London.

== History ==
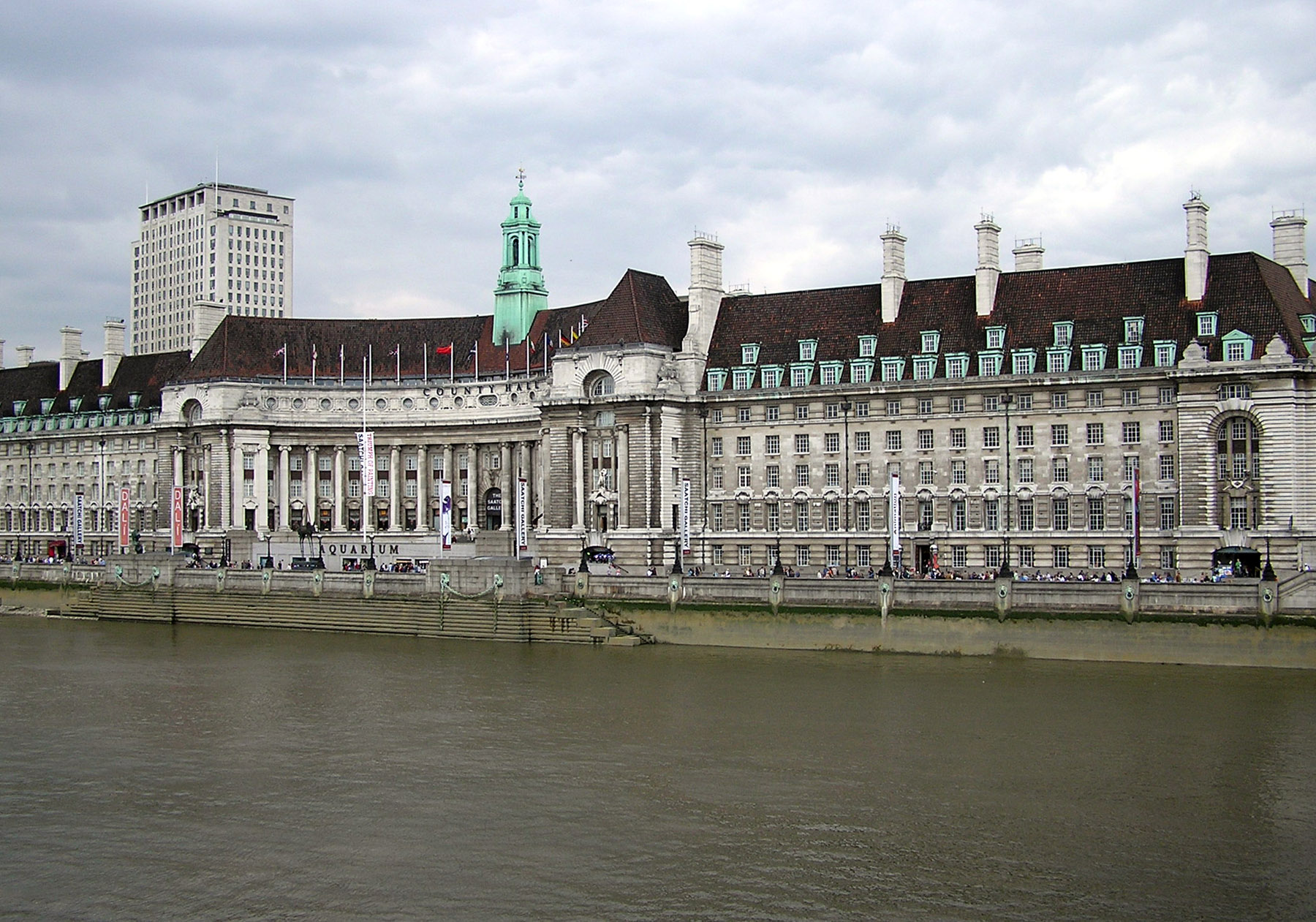
London County Hall built by Cubitts

The company was formed from the fusion of two well-established building houses that had competed throughout the later decades of the nineteenth century but came together in 1883: this was implemented by Holland & Hannen acquiring Cubitts, a business founded by Thomas Cubitt some 70 years before. During the Second World War the company was one of the contractors engaged in building the Mulberry harbour units.

In the 1960s, when Lord Ashcombe was the chairman of the company, it held a major stake in ACI Property Corporation, the developer for the Le Cartier Apartments in Montreal.

The company was acquired by Drake & Gorham Scull in 1969, and then by Tarmac in 1976 and subsequently integrated into Tarmac Construction.

== Major projects ==
The combined business went on to construct many important buildings and structures including:

- the Holborn Bars in High Holborn completed in 1906
- the Cunard Building in Liverpool completed in 1917
- the Cenotaph in London completed in 1920
- County Hall, London completed in 1922
- Ironmongers' Hall completed in 1925
- Unilever House completed in 1930
- South Africa House in London completed in 1933
- the Senate building of the University of London completed in 1937
- the Royal Festival Hall in London completed in 1951
- the Roxburgh Dam in New Zealand completed in 1956
- New Zealand House in London completed in 1961
- the West London Air Terminal completed in 1963
- Trawsfynydd nuclear power station completed in 1965
