= Jean-Marie Dessureault =

Canadian politician

Senator for Stadacona, Quebec
- In office 9 June 1945 – 16 August 1970
- Preceded by: Lorne Campbell Webster
- Succeeded by: Martial Asselin

Personal details
- Born: 30 December 1888 Sainte-Geneviève-de-Batiscan, Quebec
- Died: 26 August 1970 (aged 81)
- Party: Liberal
- Spouse: Aurore Vallée
- Profession: lumber merchant, manufacturer

Jean-Marie Dessureault (30 December 1888 – 26 August 1970) was a Liberal party member of the Senate of Canada. He was born in Sainte-Geneviève-de-Batiscan, Quebec, becoming a lumber merchant and manufacturer.

The son of Aimé Dessureault and Marie-Anne Rousseau, he was educated in Sainte-Anne-de-la-Pérade, and established himself in business at Quebec City. In 1913, he married Aurore Vallée. Dessureault served as alderman for the city of Montreal from 1922 to 1926.

He was appointed to the Senate for the Stadacona, Quebec division on 9 June 1945 as nominated by William Lyon Mackenzie King. Dessureault remained in that role until his resignation on 16 August 1970, ten days before his death.
