= Delta Hotels Saskatoon Downtown =

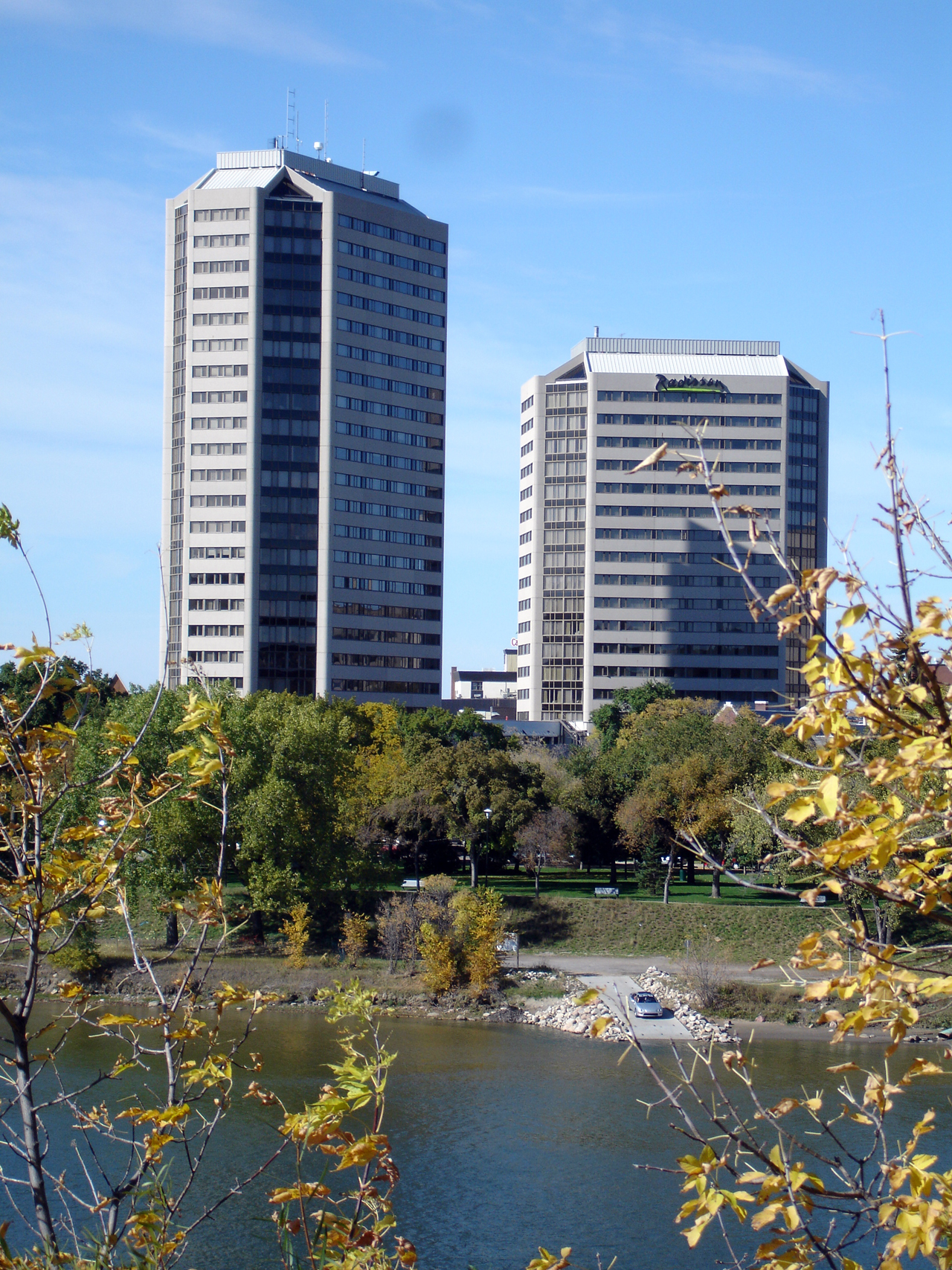
- La Renaissance Apartments and the Radisson Hotel
- Interactive map of the Delta Hotels Saskatoon Downtown area

General information
- Type: Hotel
- Location: 405 Twentieth Street East; Saskatoon, Saskatchewan, [Canada
- Coordinates: 52.1247°N 106.6616°W
- Completed: 1983
- Owner: Leadon Investments

Height
- Roof: 62 m (203 ft)

Technical details
- Floor count: 18
- Lifts/elevators: 4

The Delta Hotels Saskatoon Downtown is a hotel located at 405 Twentieth Street East in the Central Business District of Saskatoon, Saskatchewan, Canada. The building was completed in 1983 as the Ramada Renaissance Hotel and at 18 storeys tall (79.2 m), it is the ninth-tallest building in the city containing 290 rooms. It is similar in design to the La Renaissance Apartments that form part of the same complex. It was later renamed the Radisson Hotel Saskatoon when Radisson Hotels acquired the property.

The hotel was rebranded in January 2019 as part of the Delta Hotels brand of Marriott International. The Hotel completed a 17 million dollar renovation in July 2020 including all new guestrooms, lobby, restaurant, coffee bar, fitness centre and waterpark.

== See also ==
- List of tallest buildings in Saskatoon
