= Roger D'Astous =

Canadian architect

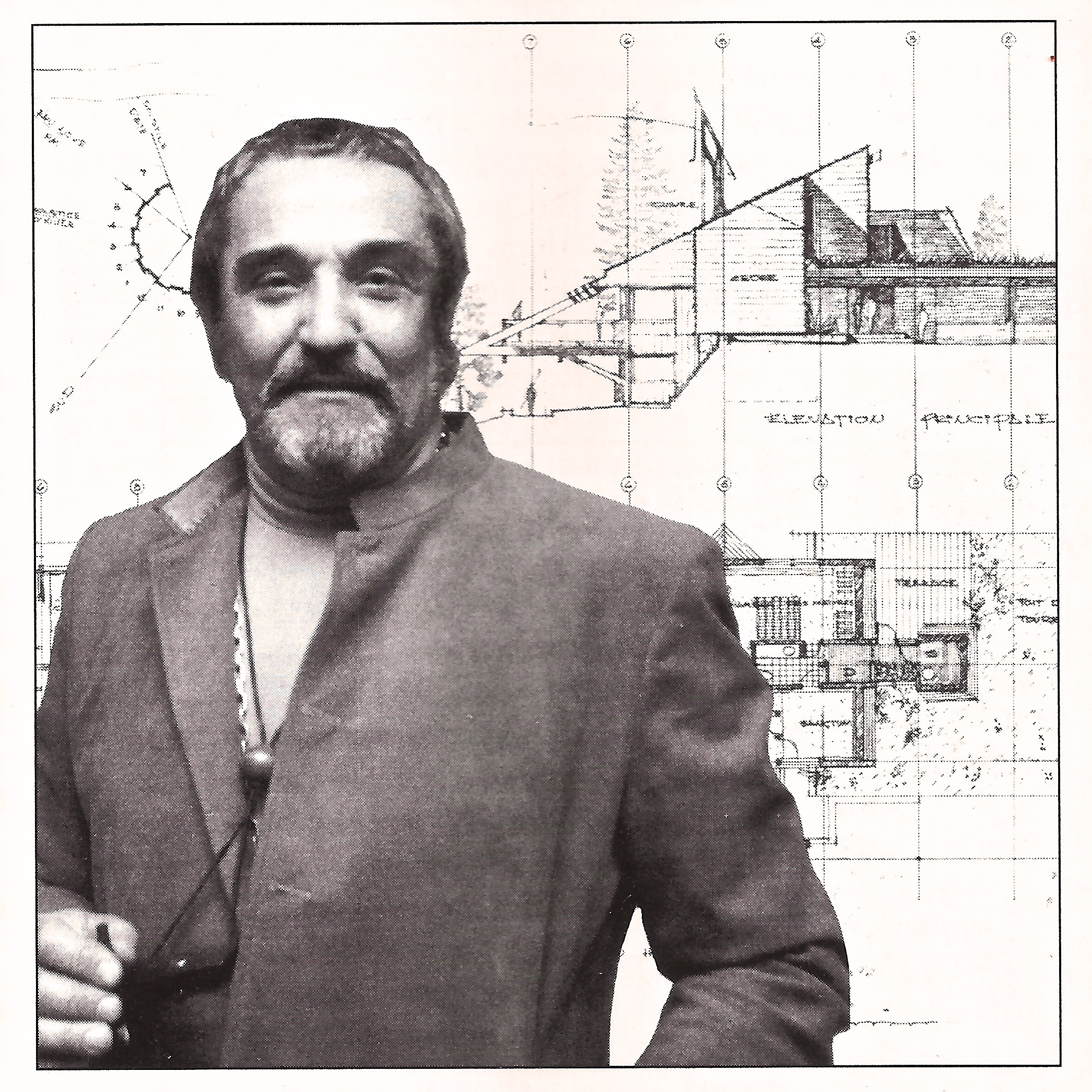
- Roger D'Astous (1991)
- Born: March 3, 1926; Montreal, Quebec, Canada
- Died: April 5, 1998 (aged 72)
- Education: École des Beaux-Arts de Montréal (1946-52), Frank Lloyd Wright, Taliesin East and West (1953)
- Occupation: Architect
- Parent(s): Corinne Basilière; René D'Astous
- Buildings: Chateau Champlain; Olympic Village - 1976; Beaubien Metro Station

Roger D'Astous (March 3, 1926 in Montreal, Quebec – April 5, 1998 in Montreal, Quebec) was a Canadian architect. His 182 projects included residential housing, churches, and religious buildings, World's fair pavilions, government buildings, and commercial buildings. In 1990, he was honored with the award of excellence from the Royal Architectural Institute of Canada (RAIC).

== Early life and education ==
Roger D'Astous was the second of four children of René D'Astous, who worked at the local newspaper, and Corine Basilières.

D'Astous began his schooling with the Sisters of Providence school, before enrolling in science courses at Collège Mont-Saint-Louis in Montreal in 1940. Six years later, he began an architecture degree at the École of fine arts in Montreal. After graduating in 1952, he joined the Taliesin Fellowship, where he completed a one-year internship (from August 1952 to July 1953) under the direction of American architect Frank Lloyd Wright in Wisconsin and Arizona, the first Quebecer architect to be an apprentice to Wright.

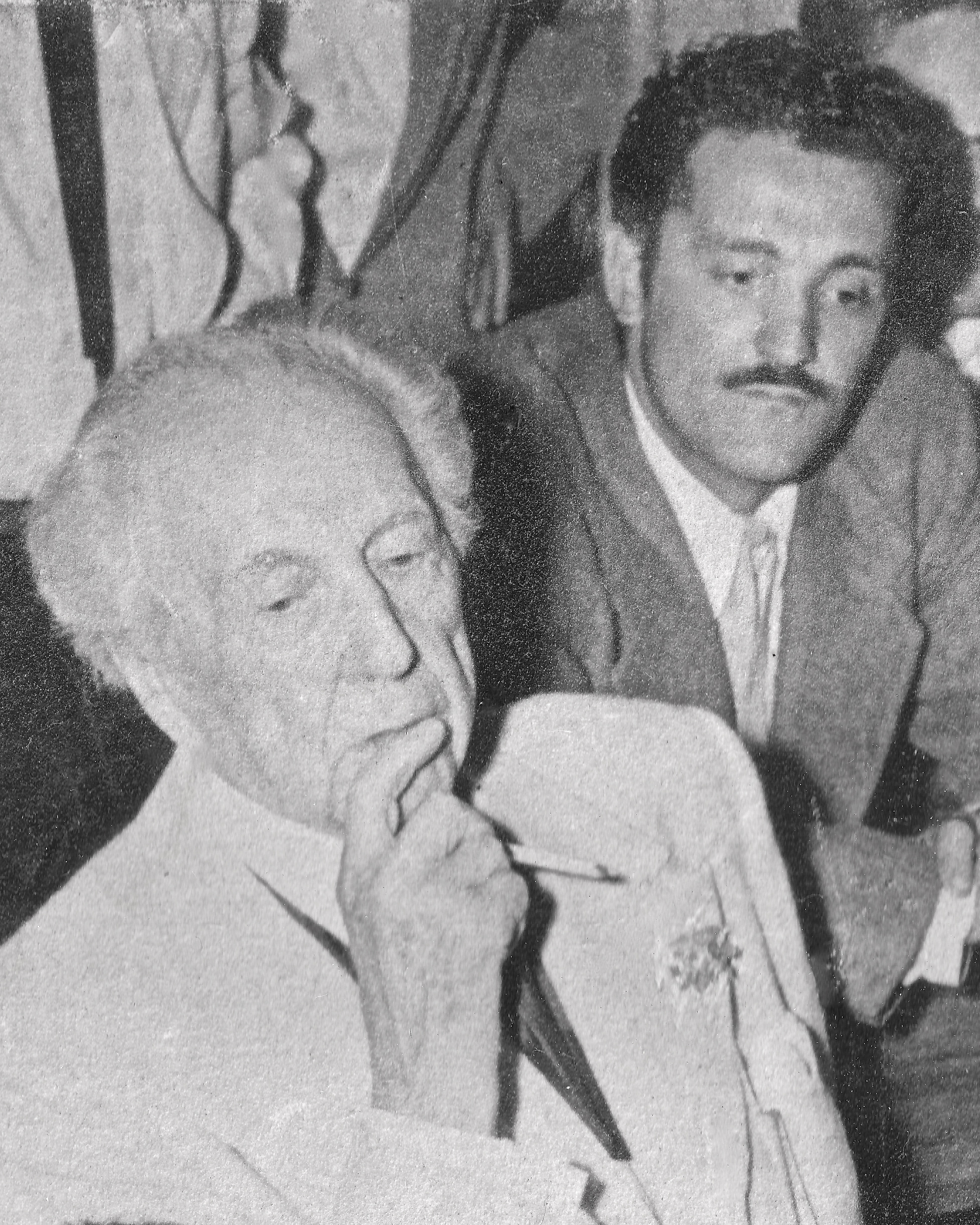
Roger D'Astous with Frank Lloyd Wright (Taliesin East, Wisconsin, 1953)

== Awards ==
D'Astous was recognized with a number of awards: the Montreal Chamber of Commerce presented him with a Habitas certificate of excellence in 1967 for his achievements in housing design, while in 1987, Roger D'Astous received two awards: the Canadian Wood Council bestowed an award for the Gélinas house and the award of excellence from the Ordre des architectes du Québec. In 1990, he was honored with the award of excellence from the Royal Architectural Institute of Canada (RAIC). In 2011, 13 years after his death, Roger D'Astous was posthumously awarded "Grand Artisan" from the Minister of Culture and Communications of Quebec, in recognition of his 50 years of contributions to Quebec's cultural scene.

== Legacy ==
In 2001, Claude Bergeron, a retired professor from Laval University and specialist in contemporary Quebec architecture, wrote a comprehensive book ("Roger D'Astous Architecte", 234 pages) about the architect's entire professional body of work. The book was published by Les Presses de l'Université de Laval.

Montreal filmmaker Étienne Desrosiers produced a 104-minute documentary, Roger D'Astous (2016), covering the complete lifespan of the architect, through interviews with clients and collaborators and unseen archive footage. The film is distributed in Canada by K-Films Amérique (DVD, VOD).

The Canadian Centre for Architecture archives contain 4,100 drawings, 2,581 photographic materials, 66 publications, 12 notebooks, 7 models, 5 artefacts, and 1.23 meters of textual records from some of D'Astous' 182 projects, which include residential housing, churches and religious buildings, World's fair pavilions, government buildings, commercial buildings, etc.

== See also ==
- Église Notre-Dame-des-Champs de Repentigny
