= Le Sanctuaire du Mont-Royal =

Coordinates: 45.5122°N 73.6252°W

- Interactive map of the Le Sanctuaire du Mont-Royal area

General information
- Status: Completed
- Type: Condominiums; Commercial; Athletic; Medical
- Architectural style: Modernism
- Location: Côte-des-Neiges, Montreal, Quebec, Canada
- Current tenants: 925 units
- Construction started: 1981
- Completed: 1990
- Cost: $241 million (1989)

Height
- Roof: 71.25 metres (233.8 ft) (Tallest - Phase VI)

Technical details
- Floor count: 16
- Floor area: 139,355 square metres (1,500,000 ft^{2})

Design and construction
- Architect: DCYSM Architecture & Design
- Developer: René Lépine Sr. (Groupe Lépine)

Le Sanctuaire du Mont-Royal (also known as Le Sanctuaire) is a multi-phase condominium, commercial, athletic and medical complex located in the Côte-des-Neiges neighbourhood near the Outremont neighbourhood of Montreal, Quebec, Canada. The complex consists of seven phases (buildings), which contain a total of 925 residential units. Le Sanctuaire was built by Montreal-based luxury developer René Lépine Sr., head of Groupe Lépine.

In total, the buildings amount to 139,355 square meters, which make them over 1.5 million square feet in size. The facades of the buildings are made of reinforced concrete. Construction officially started in 1981 and the buildings were completed in 1990. The project is considered by many to be an iconic modern Montreal landmark.
