= Lépine Towers =

Les Tours Lépine
- Interactive map of the Les Tours Lépine area

General information
- Status: Completed
- Type: Condominiums; Commercial
- Architectural style: Post-modern
- Location: 1200 de Maisonneuve Boulevard Ouest, Montreal, Quebec, Canada
- Coordinates: 45.499895°N 73.575582°W
- Current tenants: 340 units
- Construction started: 2000
- Completed: 2005
- Cost: $80 million (2005)

Height
- Roof: 80 metres (260 ft)

Technical details
- Floor count: 28 (each)
- Floor area: 52,025 square metres (559,990 ft^{2})

Design and construction
- Architect: DCYSM Architecture & Design
- Developer: René Lépine Sr. (Groupe Lépine)
- Main contractor: Construction Marton

Les Tours Lépine (also known as The Lépine Towers or Le 1200 Ouest de Maisonneuve) are twin skyscrapers located at 1200 de Maisonneuve Boulevard in the Golden Square Mile neighbourhood of Montreal, Quebec, Canada. The towers contain both condominiums and commercial spaces, with a total of 340 units. The project was built by Montreal-based luxury developer René Lépine Sr., head of Groupe Lépine.

In total, the buildings amount to 52,025 square meters, which make them 559,990 square feet in size. The structure of the buildings is made of reinforced concrete. The facades of the towers are made with a curtain wall system.

The twin towers were built on the former site of the Drummond Court building. Lépine purchased Drummond Court with plans to demolish it, as it was in poor physical condition. The demolition of Drummond Court started in 2000 and construction on the Lépine Towers began immediately after. The twin structures were completed in 2005.

The name of the buildings were changed by the new owners to 1200 Ouest de Maisonneuve when René Lépine sold the towers to El-Ad Canada.
