= CAPREIT =

Canadian real estate investment trust

Canadian Apartment Properties REIT
- Type: Public (REIT)
- Traded as: TSX: CAR.UN; S&P/TSX 60 component
- Industry: Real Estate
- Founded: May 21, 1997
- Founder: Thomas Schwartz
- Headquarters: Toronto, Ontario, Canada
- Key people: Dr. Gina P. Cody (Chair of the Board); Mark Kenney (President & CEO)
- Revenue: ▲ Can$933.1 million (2021)
- Operating income: ▲ Can$535.2 million (2021)
- Net income: ▲ Can$1.4 billion (2021)
- Total assets: ▲ Can$17.7 billion (2021)
- Total equity: ▲ Can$10.4 billion (2021)
- Number of employees: 28,500 (2021)
- Website: www.capreit.ca

Canadian Apartment Properties REIT (CAPREIT) is a Canadian real estate investment trust headquartered in Toronto, Ontario, Canada. CAPREIT is the largest publicly traded apartment landlord in Canada, with over $17.7 billion in assets, as of December 2021. As of 2022, CAPREIT owns or has interests in approximately 67,000 residential apartments, townhomes and manufactured housing units across Canada, the Netherlands and Ireland.

CAPREIT financialized the trailer park concept beginning with an acquisition in 2007 which grew to 6,456 “manufactured home community” (MHC) suites by 2017. Paid $500 million in 2004 to acquire smaller rival Residential Equities Real Estate Investment Trust. At the time of the merger the company had 24,238 rental apartments and townhouse units across the country.

It became associated with Montreal Olympic Village in 2012. In 2019 the company spun-off 2000 rental units in the Netherlands, into a separate European-focused REIT (Canada's first). CAPREIT was added to the TSX 60 index on June 22, 2020.

== History ==
In 1996, Thomas Schwartz partnered with Michael Stein to establish Canadian Apartment Properties REIT, which became one of Canada's largest residential landlords. CAPREIT went public with an initial public offering in 1997.

In 2004, CAPREIT acquired rival Residential Equities REIT for $500 million. At the time of the merger, the company had 24,238 rental apartments and townhouse units across the country.

In 2007, CAPREIT made its first acquisition in manufactured home communities.

In 2012, CAPREIT purchased Montreal's Olympic Village for $176.5 million.

In 2019, the company spun-off its European holdings into a separate company, European Residential REIT. CAPREIT retains a stake in the company, which owns over 5,865 rental apartment units in the Netherlands. In March 2021, CAPREIT extended a €165 million agreement with European Residential REIT until 2023.

CAPREIT was added to the TSX 60 index on June 22, 2020.

== Notable properties ==
- Olympic Village (Montreal)
