= Vendasta Square =

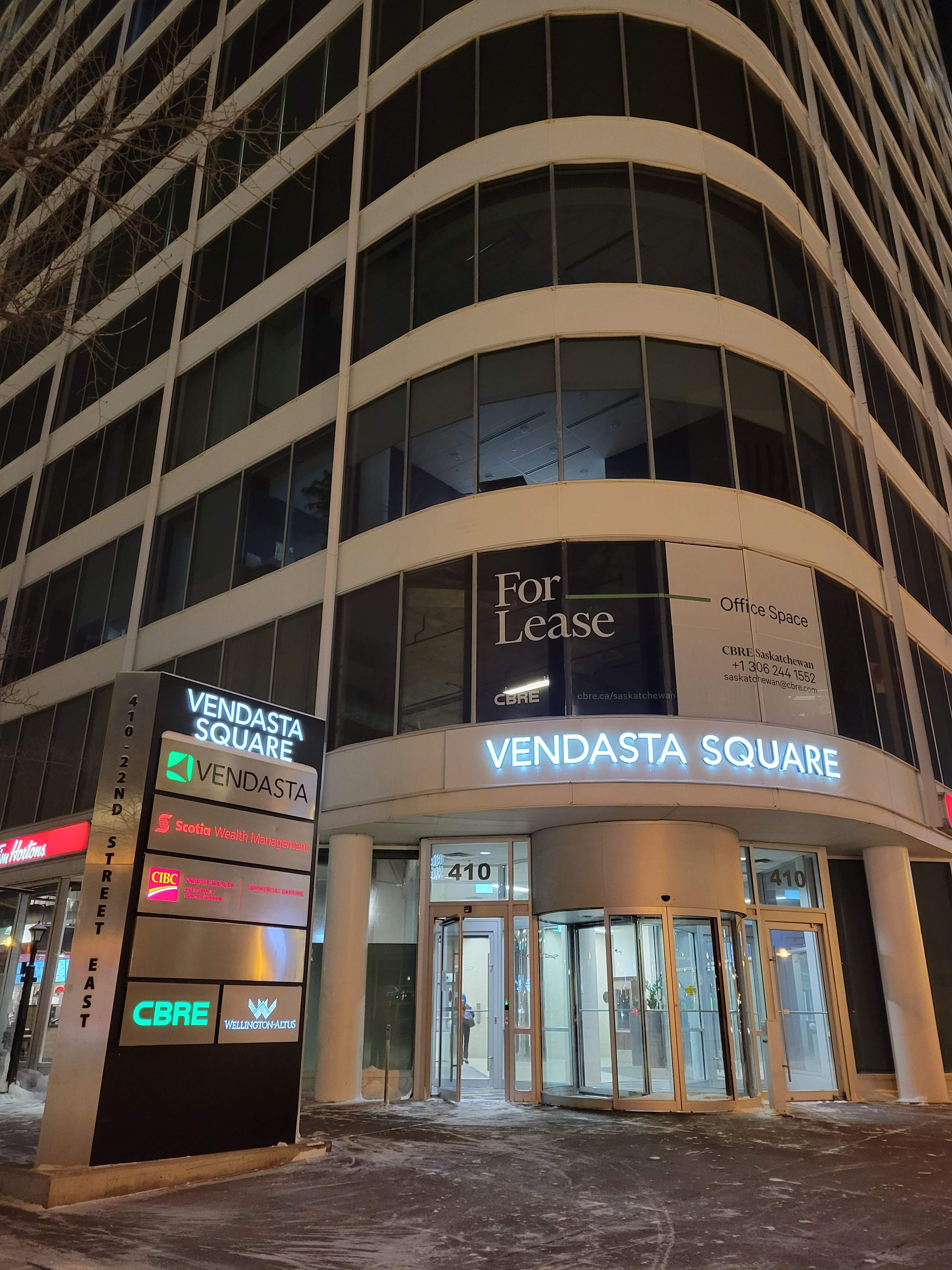
- Main entrance of Vendasta Square at night
- Interactive map of the Vendasta Square area
- Former names: Saskatoon Square

General information
- Type: Office
- Location: 22nd Street East and 4th Avenue North; Saskatoon, Saskatchewan, Canada
- Coordinates: 52.12840°N 106.65979°W
- Completed: 1979
- Owner: Dundee Real Estate Investment Trust

Height
- Roof: 72 m (236 ft)
- Top floor: 17

Technical details
- Floor count: 17
- Lifts/elevators: 4 from ground to 16 and 1 from 16 to 17

Vendasta Square (originally named Saskatoon Square) is a 17-story office tower in downtown Saskatoon, Saskatchewan. It is located at the northeast corner of 22nd Street East and 4th Avenue North. It was built in 1979 and is the eleventh tallest building in Saskatoon and the second tallest office tower after the Nutrien Tower.

In December 2010, the building was sold to Dundee Real Estate Investment Trust for $50 million. The building was previously owned by a partnership consisting of SaskTel, MacPherson, Leslie & Tyerman, the Saskatoon Health District and Commerce Holdings. SaskTel owned 70% of the building with remaining partners each holding 10%.

A seventh-storey window broke and fell to the street below on January 15, 2014. It was caused by winds gusting up to 115 kilometres per hour (71 mph), which also weakened three other windows.

Major renovations of the 16th and 17th floors took place in 2020 and 2021. They included extension of the usable floor space on the 17th, the addition of a commercial kitchen and a rooftop patio with walk out access from the 16th floor dining room.

It was renamed from Saskatoon Square to Vendasta Square in November 2022

Preceded by Delta Bessborough	Tallest building in Saskatoon; 1979-1983; 72 m	Succeeded by La Renaissance Apartments
