= Lorne Campbell Webster =

Canadian politician

The Hon. Lorne Campbell Webster
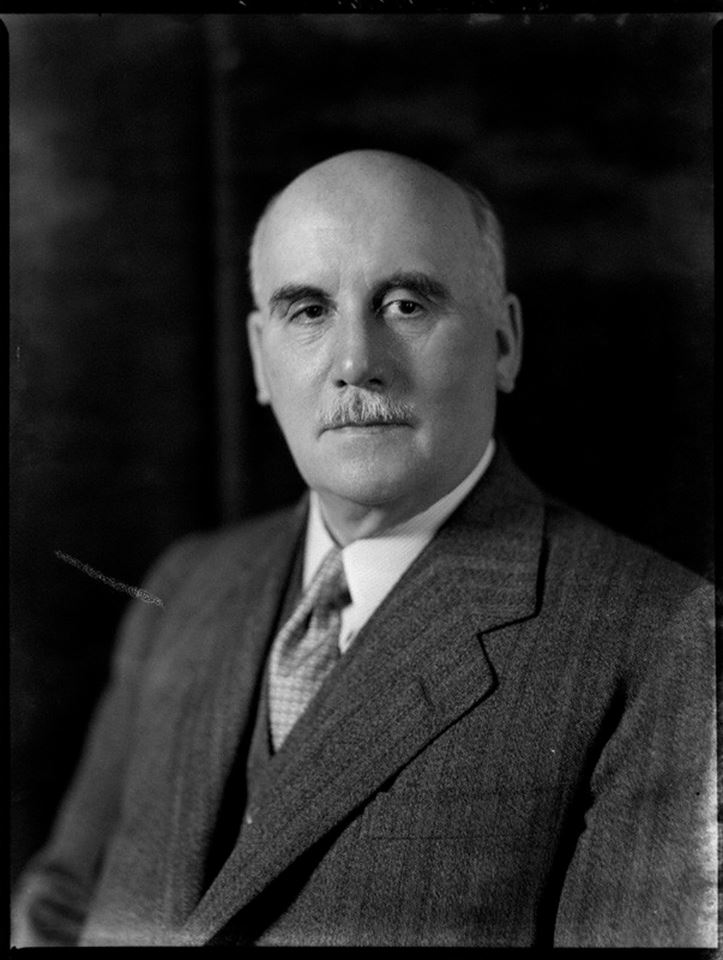

Senator for Stadacona, Quebec
- In office 1920–1941
- Appointed by: Robert Borden
- Preceded by: Auguste Charles Philippe Robert Landry
- Succeeded by: Jean-Marie Dessureault

Personal details
- Born: September 30, 1871 Quebec City, Quebec
- Died: September 27, 1941 (aged 69) Montreal, Quebec
- Party: Conservative

Lorne Campbell Webster (September 30, 1871 – September 27, 1941) was a financier and political figure in Quebec. He sat for Stadacona division in the Senate of Canada from 1920 to 1941.

He was born in Quebec City and educated at Quebec High School and Montmagny College. He entered the family fuel oil business and later founded or bought many companies. Of note, Canadian Oil Companies Ltd. during the Great Depression. He died in office at the age of 69.

A grandson also named Lorne Webster (Lorne Charles Webster) was likewise ambitious, forming his own company Prenor Group which had investments in insurance, trust services, real estate and investment services. He was a director of Bank of Montreal, Domtar, Murphy Oil, Quebecor and Dale-Ross Holdings. He also was a co-founding director and partial owner of the Montreal Expos (a Major League Baseball team no longer in existence.)
