= Montreal Marriott Château Champlain =

Hotel building in Montreal, Quebec

Montreal Marriott Château Champlain Hotel
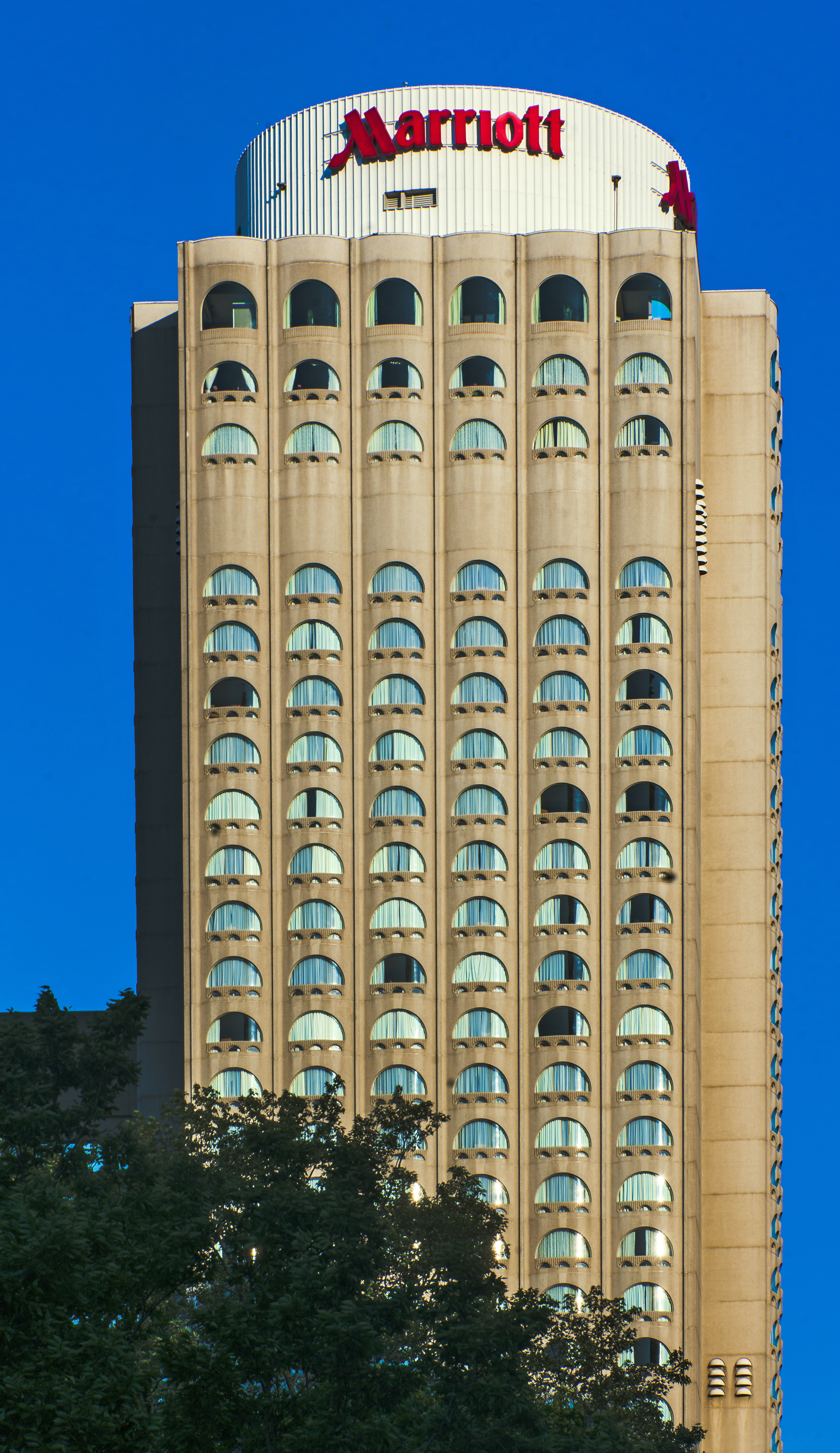
- Interactive map of the Montreal Marriott Château Champlain Hotel area

General information
- Type: Hotel
- Location: 1, place du Canada; Montreal, Quebec; H3B 4C9
- Coordinates: 45.4975°N 73.5672°W
- Completed: 1966
- Operator: Marriott International

Height
- Roof: 139 m (456 ft)

Technical details
- Floor count: 38
- Lifts/elevators: Otis Elevator Co. Ltd

Design and construction
- Architects: Roger d'Astous; Jean-Paul Pothier

Website
- www.marriott.com/en-us/hotels/yulcc-montreal-marriott-chateau-champlain/overview/

The Montreal Marriott Château Champlain is a skyscraper hotel located in Montreal, Quebec, Canada, overlooking Place du Canada, at 1050 De la Gauchetière Street West.

== History ==
Opened on January 11, 1967, Le Château Champlain was constructed by CP Hotels to accommodate the crowds visiting Expo 67. At the time it was the tallest hotel in Canada.

CP Hotels purchased CN Hotels in 1988, acquiring the larger adjacent Queen Elizabeth Hotel. As a result, they sold Le Château Champlain in 1991. Marriott assumed management in 1995, and the hotel was renamed Montreal Marriott Château Champlain. In 2018 the hotel was purchased by the Tidan Hospitality and Real Estate Group for $65 million.

== Architecture ==
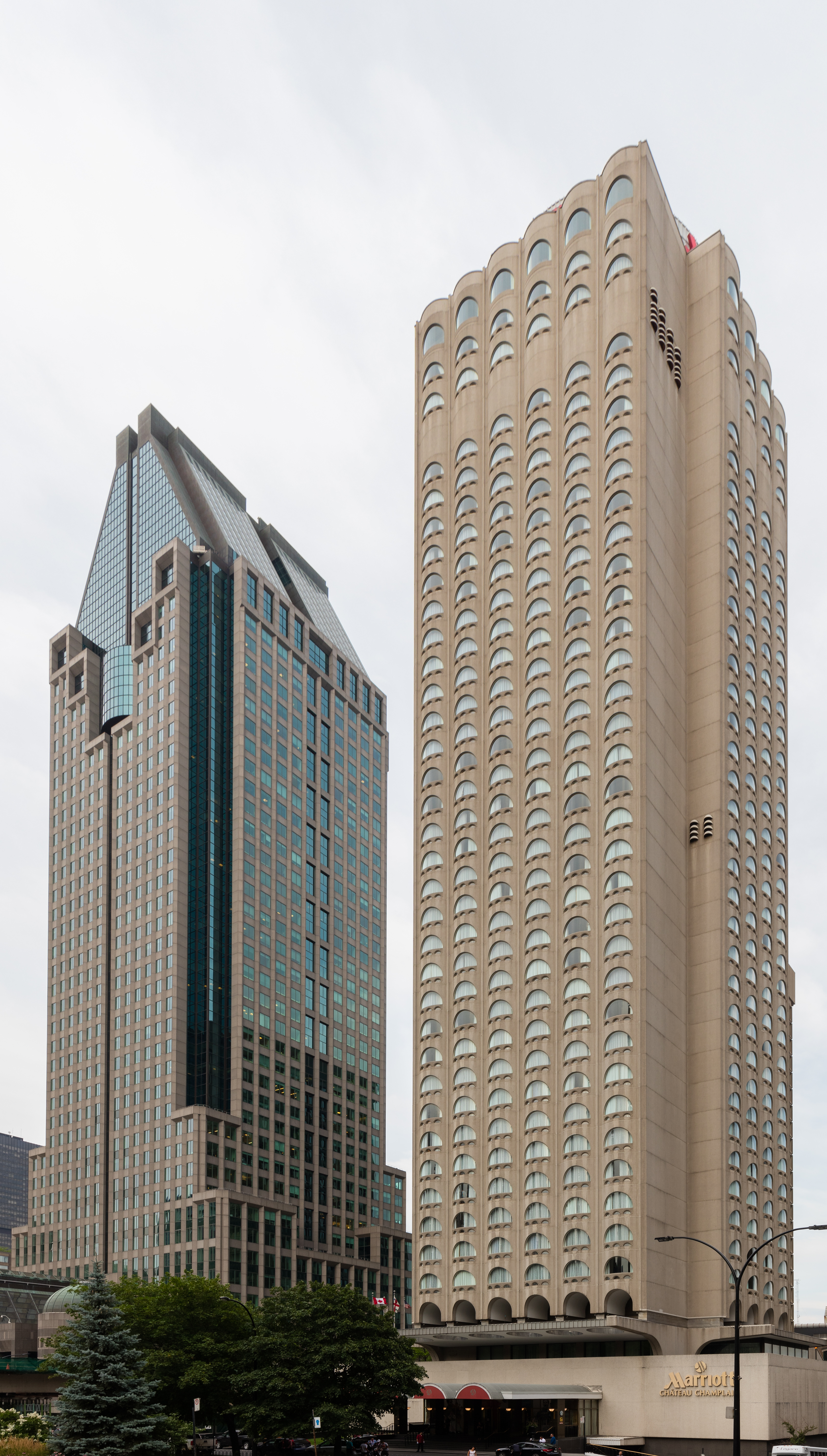
View of Château Champlain next to 1000 de La Gauchetière.

The hotel stands 139 metres (456 ft) high with 40 floors and was designed by Quebec architects Roger D'Astous and Jean-Paul Pothier. The arch-shaped windows were intended by the designers to complement the Romanesque Revival arches of nearby Windsor Station, another Canadian Pacific property. D'Astous was a student of Frank Lloyd Wright, and the Château Champlain's arches have also been cited as similar to those used on Wright's last commission, the Marin County Civic Center. However, the arched openings have led some to nickname the building the "cheese grater".

== Amenities ==
Hotel lobby

The Château Champlain has 596 guest rooms and 19 suites along with a health and fitness centre with cardiovascular and weight lifting equipment.

== See also ==
- List of tallest buildings in Montreal
