= La Renaissance Apartments =

Apartment building located at 424 Spadina Crescent East in Saskatoon, Saskatchewan

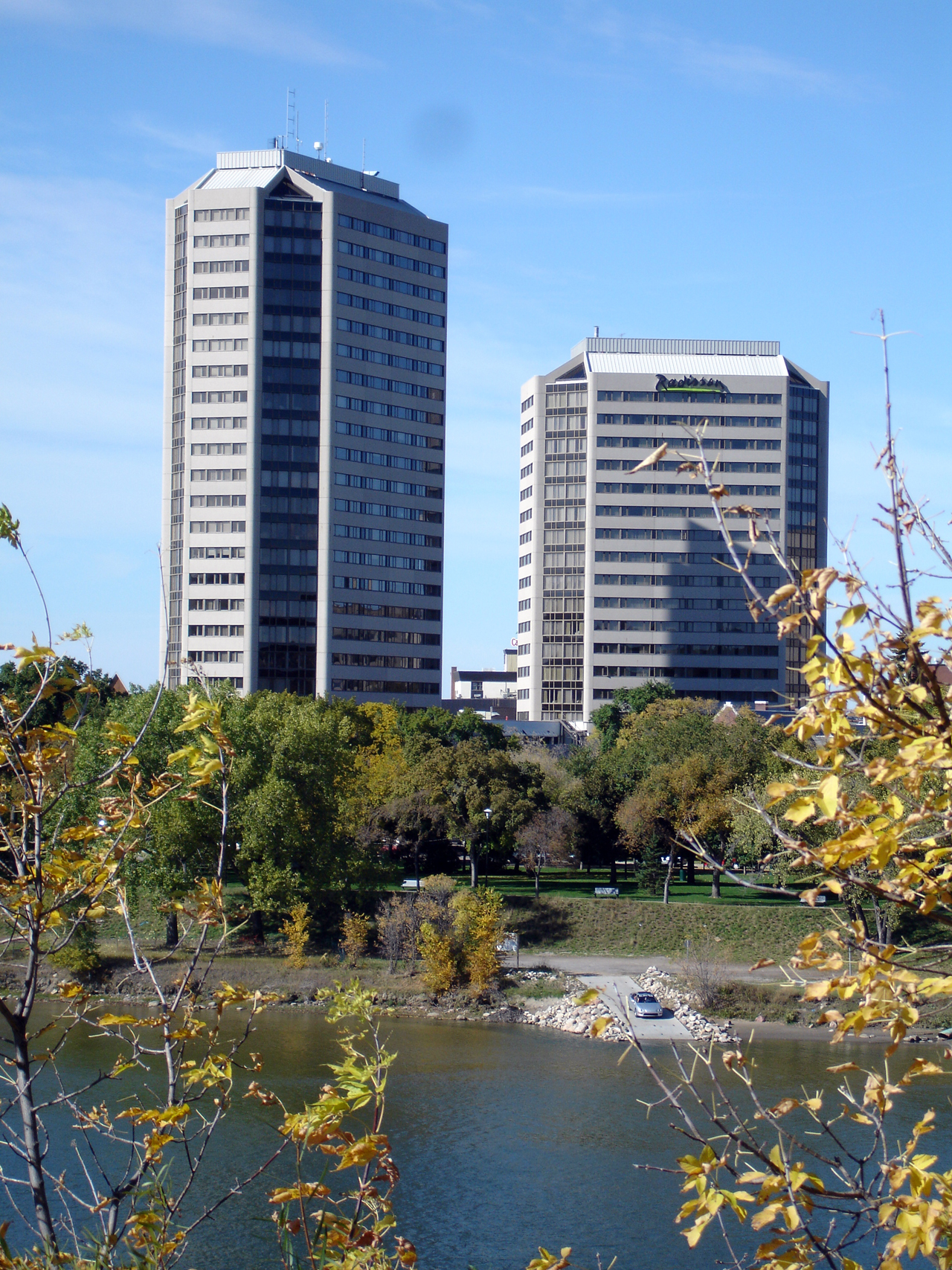
- La Renaissance Apartments (left) and the Radisson Hotel
- Interactive map of the La Renaissance Apartments area

General information
- Type: Residential
- Location: 424 Spadina Crescent East; Saskatoon, Saskatchewan, Canada
- Coordinates: 52.1242°N 106.6612°W
- Completed: 1983

Height
- Roof: 79.2 m (260 ft)

Technical details
- Floor count: 24

La Renaissance Apartments is an apartment building located at 424 Spadina Crescent East in the Central Business District of Saskatoon, Saskatchewan, Canada. Completed in 1983, the building stands at 24 stories (79.2 meters) tall, making it the second-tallest structure in the city. It houses a total of 96 condominium units. It is similar in design to Regina's Delta Regina Hotel.

== See also ==
- List of tallest buildings in Saskatoon
- Delta Hotels Saskatoon Downtown

Preceded by Saskatoon Square	Tallest building in Saskatoon; 1983-Present; 79.2 m	Succeeded by
