= Hallmark Place =

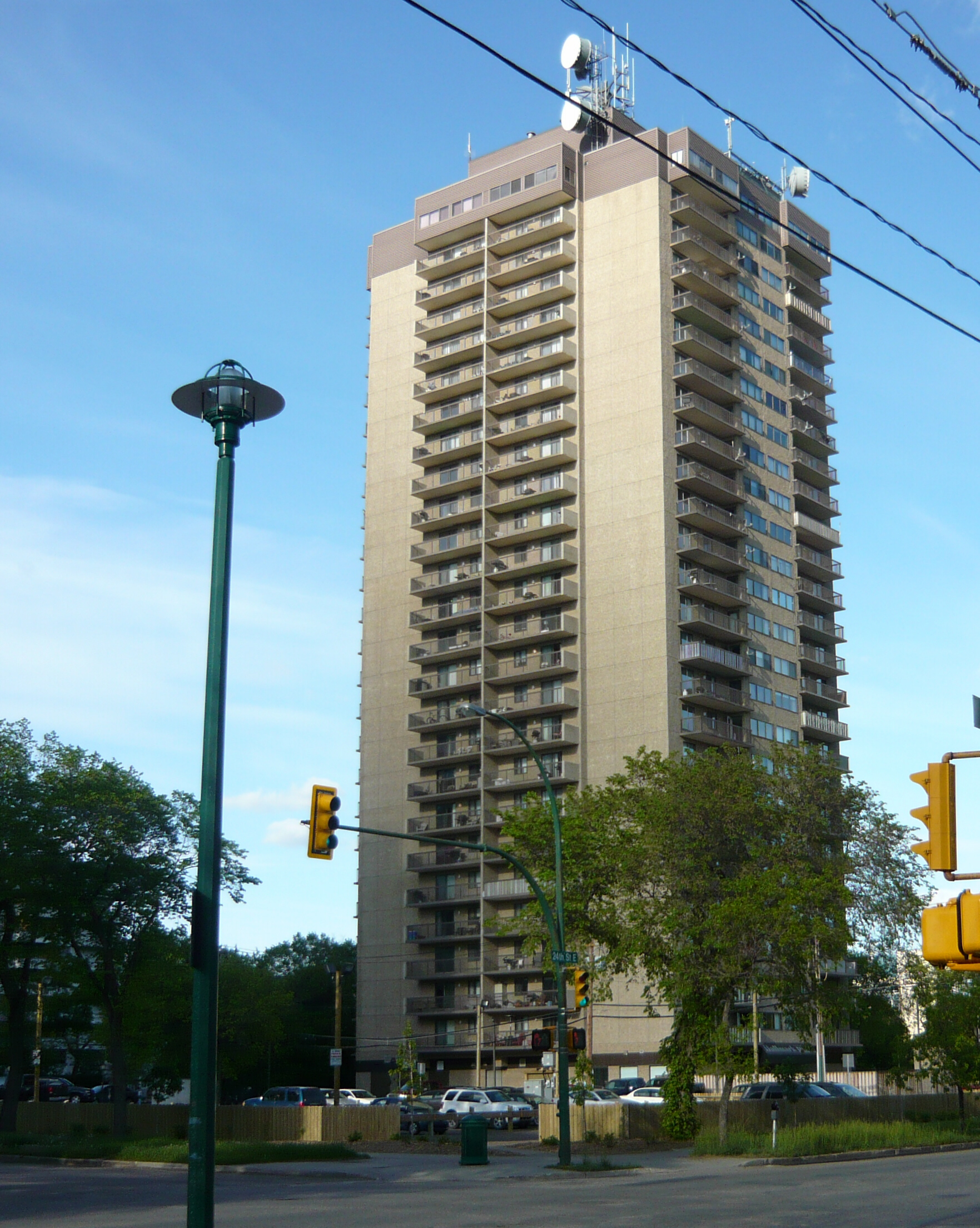
- Hallmark Place
- Interactive map of the Hallmark Place area

General information
- Type: Residential
- Location: 311 6th Avenue North; Saskatoon, Saskatchewan, Canada
- Coordinates: 52°7′52.21″N 106°39′20.37″W
- Completed: 1984

Height
- Roof: 78.3 m (257 ft)

Technical details
- Floor count: 27

Hallmark Place is a condominium building located at 311 6th Avenue North in the Central Business District of Saskatoon, Saskatchewan, Canada. The building has 27 stories (78.8 m) and is the third tallest building in the city. The building is a condominium development where, in addition to individual owners, a number of units are offered as short-term business suites.

== See also ==
- List of tallest buildings in Saskatoon
