= René Lépine =

Canadian businessman (1929–2012)

- Born: October 23, 1929; Montreal, Quebec, Canada
- Died: April 18, 2012 (aged 82); Montreal, Quebec, Canada
- Occupation: Founder of Groupe Lépine
- Spouse(s): Françoise Larrivière-Lépine (m. 1950; div. 1990); Josée Lacoste-Lépine
- Children: 7 Rene H. Lépine, Jr. Normand Lépine; Louis Lépine; Francis Lépine; Francesca Lépine; Charles Lépine

René G. Lépine (born October 23, 1929 – April 18, 2012) was a Canadian real estate developer and philanthropist. Lépine was the chairman of Groupe Lépine, a real estate development and investment firm he founded in 1953. He is widely considered one of the most influential French Canadian real estate developers of his time. His companies developed over $5 billion of real estate in Canada and the United States since the 1960s. He also owned a portfolio of multifamily and retail properties in Montreal and Ottawa. Lépine developed many buildings considered landmarks in Montreal, including the Olympic Village and Le Sanctuaire du Mont-Royal. Lépine is also credited with having developed the first condominiums in Montreal in 1981.

== Early life and education ==
Lépine was born and raised in Ville-Émard, a working-class neighborhood of Montreal, in a family of 10 children. His father was a hardware store clerk. Lépine started his first business at the age of 10, selling woodchips for fireplaces door-to-door at 10 cents a bag that he would pick up off the ground outside a timber factory in Lachine. At the age of 13, he dropped out of school to earn money for his family after his father became ill. He worked at a jewelry factory and also started a flooring business. At the age of 19, he had $4,000 in savings, borrowed $8,000 from his local credit union and built his first real estate project, a single family house in Côte Saint-Luc. He sold it to someone passing by on the street for $17,000. Lépine quickly built two more houses with his profits, and eventually incorporated his own construction company in 1953.

== Career ==
In 1969, Lépine and his business partner Lorne Webster purchased the 140-unit apartment building Tour Horizon at 1212 Pine Avenue in Montreal for $3 million. The same year, they purchased the 181-unit apartment building Le Cartier Tower at 1115 Sherbrooke Street in Montreal from the Montreal Trust Company out of receivership for $6 million. Both buildings had high vacancies and were renovated extensively. In 1971, Lépine and Webster wanted to purchase the Van Horne Mansion, adjacent to Le Cartier, and were planning a $7 million office building development.

By 1974, Lépine owned or controlled over 1,000 rental apartments in Montreal through various partnerships.

In 1974, he, Joseph Zappia, Gerald Robinson and Andrew Gaty, were appointed by Jean Drapeau to build the Olympic Village for the 1976 Summer Olympics in Montreal.

He was the chairman of real estate for MD Financial and bought over $1 billion worth of properties for the MD Realty Fund.

Since the 1960s, he built more than 1,500 houses in Montreal's Hampstead, Westmount and Côte Saint-Luc areas, as well as over 10,000 condominium units across Canada and the United States.

In 1978, Lépine made his first real estate investment in the United States with the purchase of Drake Tower, a 143-unit apartment building in Fort Lauderdale, Florida. Throughout the 1980s, Lépine developed multiple apartment and commercial buildings in South Florida, namely in Broward County and Palm Beach County. In 1980, Lépine purchased a 127-unit apartment building known as The Patrician at 2168 South Ocean Boulevard in Boca Raton, Florida. He re-developed the property and converted the rental units to condominiums. The project recorded over $9 million in sales in the first year. In 1980, Lépine also purchased The Berkshire at 1775 South Ocean Boulevard in Delray Beach, Florida, the first time share in Palm Beach County. By 1985, Groupe Lépine's Florida division had reached US$20 million per year in sales.

In 1979, Lépine acquired a large parcel of land on Deom Avenue on the border of the Outremont neighborhood of Montreal from St. Patrick's Society of Montreal for a total of $8 million over multiple phases. He had acquired the property with the intention of developing 1,500 apartments. This was met with resistance from the city of Montreal, who wanted to convert the entire property into a park. Lépine argued that this would not be in the best interest of citizens, as it would cost the city at least $10 million, with no long term tax revenues. Lépine eventually struck a deal with Montreal Mayor Jean Drapeau, who approved the development in the spring of 1981 for 725 apartments, in exchange for Lépine giving the city 20% of the land on his property for public park space at no charge. The project was later approved for over 925 apartments, with added commercial zoning for retail. The parcel of land measured nearly 1.1 million square feet. The project also directly created 2,000 jobs.

In late November 1981, Lépine started the development of Le Sanctuaire du Mont-Royal, a five building, 925-unit condominium, retail and athletic complex in Outremont, Quebec, the biggest project of his career. The project was pioneering and was the first time condominiums were ever built in Montreal, a newly-invented form of ownership that was far more attractive to homebuyers. It was the largest development in Montreal at the time since the Olympic Village. The project was originally estimated to cost $125 million, but increased to $140 million. The project was financed by the Mercantile Bank of Canada, which was acquired by National Bank of Canada during the development in 1986. As was noted by the CMHC in 1989, Lépine's soaring sales were an exception to the lagging real estate market in Quebec during the same period. By 1989, sales at the project had exceeded $250 million. Le Sanctuaire was Lépine's most financially successful and widely considered the magnum opus of his career. It was widely reported that Lépine was intending to retire after developing this project, but did not.

By 1985, Lépine's company Groupe Lépine had over $300 million of real estate assets. Lépine had considered venturing into developing office buildings in partnership with a major Canadian insurance company.

In 1985, Lépine acquired a property at 3440 Peel Street in downtown Montreal from McGill University that included three historic Victorian greystone houses and a low-rise apartment building directly adjacent to two of his other properties. He announced his intention to develop a 67-unit apartment building on the property, originally named Le Cartier II, later changed to Sir Robert Peel, at a cost of $15 million. Lépine was initially refused a demolition permit, but was granted one after winning an appeal in court in May 1987, reversing the initial decision. The move by the appeals court to grant a demolition permit on three historic buildings to Lépine was highly controversial and angered Heritage Montreal and Phyllis Lambert. The project was completed in 1990.

In 1989, Lépine was the lead contender in a $100 million deal to purchase Blue Bonnets, a 146 acre property, from Campeau Corporation. Lépine planned to build a $2 billion mixed use project consisting of apartments, office and retail space on the site, which received partial pre-approval by the city of Montreal. Ultimately, Lépine bid $75 million, but did not buy the property due to weakness in the real estate market at the time.

In 1991, Lépine announced the development of Alexander Pushkin Tower, a $70 million mixed use office and apartment project in Pushkin Square, Moscow, Russia with his business partner Hervé Pomerleau. He was also planning a development called Canada Place, a 1,200-unit apartment project inspired by Le Sanctuaire du Mont-Royal in Moscow that was estimated to cost up to $700 million. However, Lépine's projects in Russia were never completed due to a variety of operational and political difficulties. Lépine was financially backed by the Government of Canada, as well as from the Caisse de dépôts et placement du Québec and tenants who had secured office leases, including Samsung. Moscow mayor Yury Luzhkov was also personally involved in the planning of the project. Lépine was asked by the Government of Canada to build the Canadian embassy in Moscow. He was an official representative of the Canadian government and gave a personal tour of Montreal to a Russian diplomatic delegation that included Yury Luzhkov. Lépine also met with Mikhail Gorbachev, and Boris Yeltsin during their respective delegation visits to Montreal.

In September 1996, Lépine made his first real estate investment in Ontario. He purchased a low income, 208-unit apartment building known as Rideau-Chapel Towers at 160 Chapel Street in Ottawa, Ontario, on the corner of Rideau Street. After a $18.5 million renovation, Lépine increased the number of units to 397 apartments and tripled the original rent. The property was widely publicized after all 175 tenants were controversially evacuated in September 1996 by orders of the Ottawa fire marshal due to multiple building and fire code violations of the previous owner. Lépine gave $65,000 to the city of Ottawa to help relocate the displaced tenants to new homes. Ottawa Mayor Jacquelin Holzman attended the official reopening of the building, renamed Horizon Tower, with Lépine in June 1997.

In 1998, Lépine developed Sussex House, a 85-unit apartment building at 22 Murray Street in the ByWard Market neighborhood of Ottawa, across the street from the newly-built United States Embassy on Sussex Drive. The project was specifically aimed at catering to diplomatic and corporate housing needs. Before opening, Lépine had signed long-term leases with the US Department of State, Nortel and Newbridge Networks for their contract employees. The project cost $10 million. The property was built on land owned by the National Capital Commission, who signed a 66-year leasehold with Lépine. He also developed Robson Court, a 56-unit condominium project in the Kanata Lakes neighborhood of Ottawa, the same year.

In 1999, Lépine purchased Drummond Court, a vacant building in poor condition on De Maisonneuve Boulevard in Montreal from the Montreal YMCA. Lépine demolished Drummond Court in the summer of 2000. The project was part of a deal with the city of Montreal and the Montreal YMCA to revamp the area, which had fallen into disrepair. The project was supported by Montreal Mayor Pierre Bourque, who alleviated hurdles throughout the development process. As part of the deal, the Montreal YMCA agreed to invest $20 million to renovate and relocate to the Norris Building, adjacent to Lépine's new project. Lépine announced he would develop twin, 340-unit apartment buildings named Lépine Towers at 1200 De Maisonneuve Boulevard Ouest for $80 million. The buildings changed names after Lépine sold the property to El-Ad Group during the final phase of construction in 2005.

In 1997, Lépine entered public tender negotiations with the Canadian Department of National Defence to acquire a property they owned on Atwater Avenue, on the side of Mount Royal adjacent to Westmount, Quebec. The same year, the federal government offered the city of Montreal the chance to purchase the property for conservation, but Montreal city officials declined the offer in an official July 1997 correspondence. After failing to sell the property to the municipal government, the Canadian Department of National Defence sold the property to Canada Lands Company for $3.3 million in February 1999, a value the federal government had reviewed to be fair. Soon after, Lépine reached a tentative agreement to purchase the property from Canada Lands Company. Heritage Montreal founder Phyllis Lambert sent a petition with 160 signatures to Montreal Mayor Pierre Bourque, urging him to block Lépine's project. However, the city of Montreal granted his zoning request and overwhelmingly approved Lépine's project, voting 7-2 in favour, in March 1999, shortly before closing on the property.

In April 1999, Lépine acquired the property for $4 million, which was the highest offer obtained by the public tender. As soon as Lépine closed on the property, some estimated its market value with new residential zoning at $20 million. Lépine announced the development of 55 single family homes and 9 condominiums. Lépine's purchase price raised questions as the federal crown corporation reported to Public Works Minister Alfonso Gagliano, a liberal, while Lépine had been a longtime donor to the Liberal Party of Canada. The price paid by Lépine was less than half the property's assessed value of $9 million, but in line with reviewed federal estimates. During his first year of ownership, Lépine paid property taxes based on a value of $9 million. The main building on the property, which was formerly the Canadian Armed Forces main headquarters for Quebec, was classified as a federal historic monument, which Lépine preserved by keeping the original structure and converting it to condominiums as part of the deal. Lépine paid for public utilities on the property, costing $2 million. There was public outcry for conservation and calls to preserve 215 trees. Over 19 trees were cut down, including one over 100 years old.

== Personal life ==
Since his early 70s, Lépine spent his time between work in Montreal and his other home in Palm Beach, Florida.

Lépine died at his home on April 18, 2012, after a lengthy battle with prostate cancer.
