= Le Cartier Apartments =

Apartment building in Montreal

Le Cartier
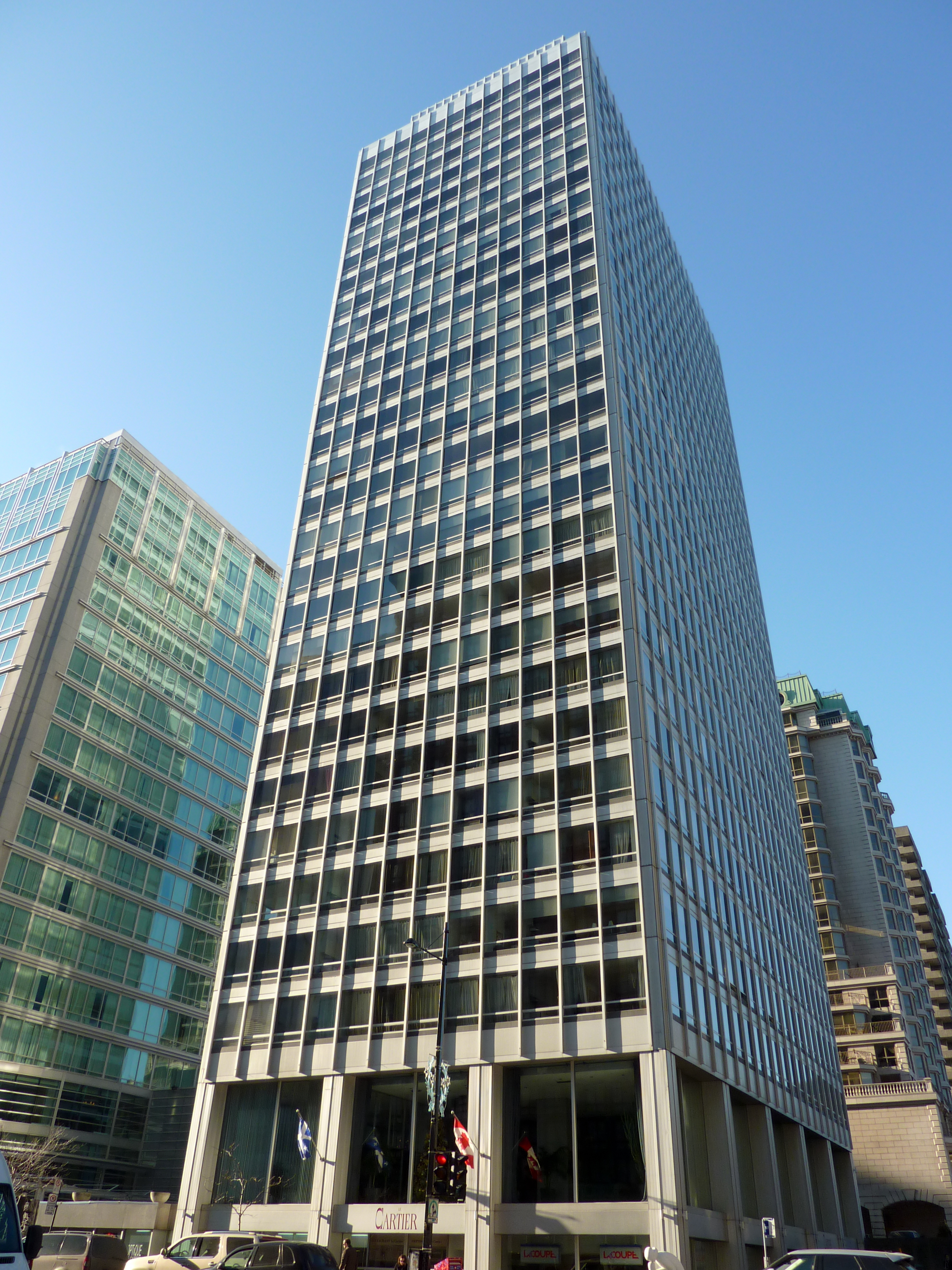
- Alternative names: Tour Le Cartier, Le Cartier Apartments

General information
- Location: 1115 Sherbrooke Street West, Montreal, Quebec
- Coordinates: 45°30′6.53″N 73°34′36.91″W
- Construction started: 1963
- Completed: 1964
- Cost: $9 million (1965)
- Owner: Benvenuto Group

Height
- Roof: 98 metres (322 ft)

Technical details
- Floor count: 35
- Floor area: 31,555.6 m^{2} (339,662 sq ft)

Design and construction
- Architect: Menkès & Webb
- Developer: ACI Property Corporation

Le Cartier is an apartment building in Montreal, Quebec. It is located at 1115 Sherbrooke Street West at the corner of Peel Street and Sherbrooke Street West in the Golden Square Mile area of Downtown Montreal. When completed in 1964, Le Cartier was the tallest apartment building in Canada and throughout the Commonwealth. It is 32 stories above ground and stands at 98 metres (322 ft) tall. It contains four basement floors, four elevators and 188 units.

== History ==
Le Cartier's architecture is considered to be of international style and its core structure is made of steel. Its construction began in 1963 and was completed in 1964. When it was planned it was named the Peelbrooke Tower, but this changed during construction to Le Cartier. It was designed by Menkes and Webb. The developer was ACI Property Corporation, led by British peer Henry Cubitt, 4th Baron Ashcombe. After the bankruptcy of ACI Property Corporation in the mid-1960s, Le Cartier was repossessed by the Montreal Trust Company. It was subsequently purchased by René Lépine and Lorne Wesbter in 1969. René Lépine bought the Webster family's shares.

In December 2020, the Benvenuto Group purchased the building and has since commenced an extensive renovation program.
