= NEUF architect(e)s =

NEUF architectes
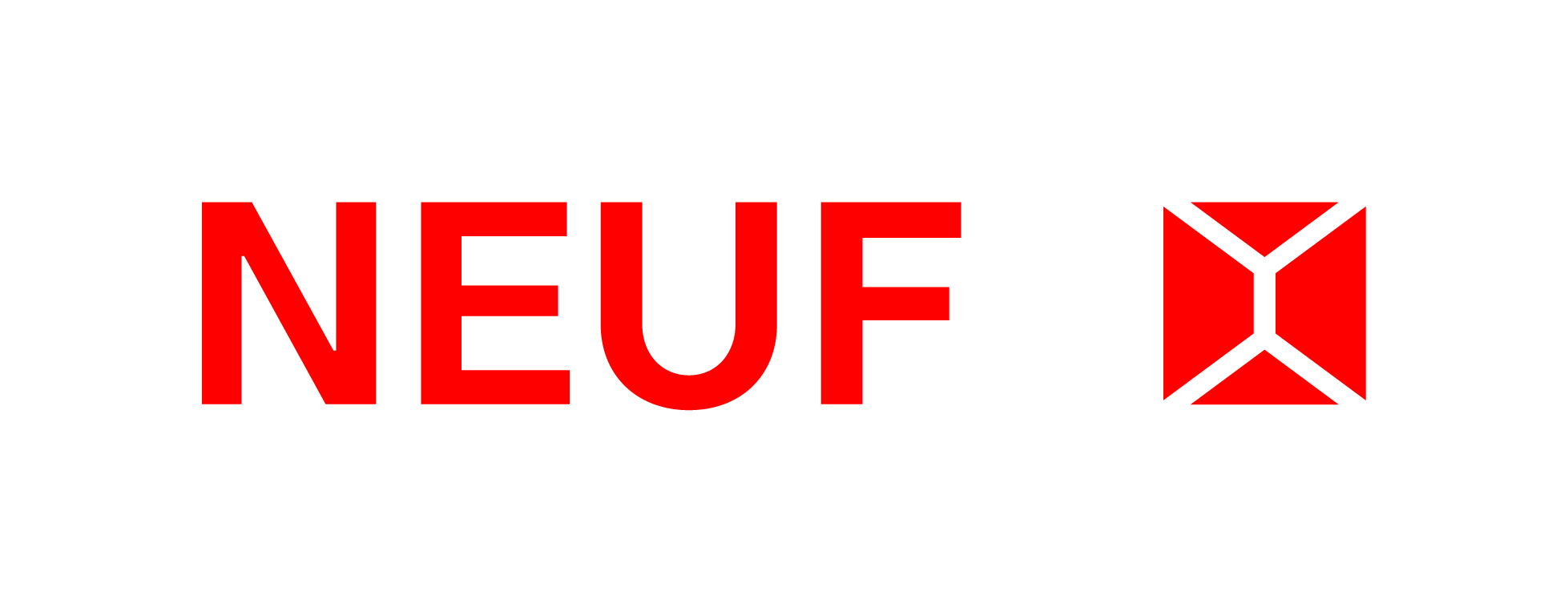
- Type: Private
- Industry: Architecture
- Founded: 1971
- Headquarters: Montreal, Quebec, Canada
- Key people: Anne Bernier; Evelyne Cardinal; Antoine Cousineau (President, since 2024); Azad Chichmanian; Christopher Ilg; Frank Puentes; Guy Caron; Hugo Gagnon; Jean-François Trahan; Kim Pham; Samuel Pouliot; Lilia Koleva; Louis Cormier; Lucien Haddad Charles-André La Violette; Rainier Silva
- Number of employees: 200-250
- Website: https://www.neuf.ca/

NEUF architectes is a Canadian architecture firm.

== Awards and distinctions ==
Project, City	Awards and distinctions	City	Year
SOLSTICE, Montreal, QC	Prix Habitat Design : Espaces Communs	Montreal, CA	2019
SOLSTICE, Montreal, QC	Prix Habitat Design : Choix du Public	Montreal, CA	2019
ROCKCLIFFE PARK FIELD HOUSE, Ottawa, ON	Ottawa Urban Design Awards: Public spaces	Ottawa, CA	2019
ROCKCLIFFE PARK FIELD HOUSE, Ottawa, ON	Ottawa Urban Design Awards: Civic Spaces	Ottawa, CA	2019
111-113 YORKVILLE, Toronto, ON	DNA Paris Design Awards : Commerces et Bureaux	Paris, FR	2020
111-113 YORKVILLE, Toronto, ON	World Architecture Festival: Future Projects - Commercial Mixed-Use (finalist)	Amsterdam, NL	2019
111-113 YORKVILLE, Toronto, ON	Architecture MasterPrize : Architectural Design / Commercial Architecture	Los Angeles, USA	2019
BIRKS HOTEL, Montreal, QC	DNA Paris Design Awards : Hospitalité, Honorable mention	Paris, FR	2020
BIRKS HOTEL, Montreal, QC	Architecture MasterPrize: Architectural Design / Restoration & Renovation	Los Angeles, USA	2019
BIRKS HOTEL, Montreal, QC	World Architecture Festival: Completed Building - Hotel and Leisure (finalist)	Amsterdam, NL	2019
BIRKS HOTEL, Montreal, QC	Prix d'excellence de la construction en acier CISC-ICCA: finalist	Montreal, CA	2019
BIRKS HOTEL, Montreal, QC	International Design Awards : Gold - Hotel & Resorts	Los Angeles, USA	2019
YOO, Montreal, QC	Grands Prix du Design: Terrasse et aménagement paysager résidentiel de projet domiciliaire	Montreal, CA	2019
YOO, Montreal, QC	Architecture MasterPrize: Landscape Architecture / Residential	Los Angeles, USA	2018
SIÈGE SOCIAL CSN, Montreal, QC	Grands Prix du Design: Aire commune	Montreal, CA	2019
SIÈGE SOCIAL CSN, Montreal, QC	Archmarathon: Institutional Building (finaliste)	Miami, USA	2018
PERFORMANCE COURT AT 150 ELGIN, Ottawa, ON	TOBY Awards: 250,000 to 499,999 ft²	Toronto, CA	2018
SAINT-HYACINTHE HOTEL AND CONVENTION CENTRE, Saint-Hyacinthe, QC	Prix d'excellence en architecture de l'Ordre des Architectes du Québec: Prix du public (finalist)	Montreal, CA	2019
SAINT-HYACINTHE HOTEL AND CONVENTION CENTRE, Saint-Hyacinthe, QC	Prix d'excellence de la construction en acier CISC-ICCA: Coup de coeur du jury, Projets commerciaux, Projets jeunes ingénieurs - architectes	Montreal, CA	2018
ANDAZ, Ottawa, ON	Best of Canada: Canadian Interiors, Hospitality	Toronto, CA	2018
THE MEWS - 101 YORKVILLE, Toronto, ON	International Design Awards: Architecture - New Commercial Building / Bronze	Los Angeles, USA	2019
THE MEWS - 101 YORKVILLE, Toronto, ON	Architecture MasterPrize: Landscape Architecture / Public, Landscape Architecture / Commercial	Los Angeles, USA	2018
THE MEWS - 101 YORKVILLE, Toronto, ON	Architizer A+ Awards: Commercial Unbuilt (finalist)	New-York, USA	2018
THE MEWS - 101 YORKVILLE, Toronto, ON	World Architecture Festival: Commercial Mixed-Use Future Project - Highly Commended	Amsterdam, NL	2018
LE NOUVEAU CHUM, Montreal, QC	International Interior Design Association: Healthcare Interior Design Award	Chicago, SUA	2018
LE NOUVEAU CHUM, Montreal, QC	The Chicago Athenaeum: International Architecture Award	Athens, GR	2018
LE NOUVEAU CHUM, Montreal, QC	Healthcare Design Showcase: Award of Merit	Omaha, USA	2018
LE NOUVEAU CHUM, Montreal, QC	Grands Prix du Design: Aire commune, Accessibilité universelle, Santé et recherche, Hors catégorie et Projet de l'année	Montreal, CA	2018
LE NOUVEAU CHUM, Montreal, QC	American Architecture Prize: Healthcare, Heritage	New-York, USA	2017
LE NOUVEAU CHUM, Montreal, QC	Interior Best of Year: Shining Moment, Outdoor	New-York, USA	2017
LE NOUVEAU CHUM, Montreal, QC	Best of Canada Award: Canadian Interiors	Toronto, CA	2017
LE NOUVEAU CHUM, Montreal, QC	Archmarathon: Caring	Miami, USA	2017
LE NOUVEAU CHUM, Montreal, QC	CISC Awards: Architectural walkway, Erection	Montreal, CA	2017
LE NOUVEAU CHUM, Montreal, QC	World Architecture Festival: Display, Health Completed Projects, Old and New Completed Buildings (finalist)	Berlin, DE	2017
LE NOUVEAU CHUM, Montreal, QC	INSIDE Festival: Health and Education	Berlin, DE	2017
LE NOUVEAU CHUM, Montreal, QC	Design and Health Academy Awards: Future Healthy Building	Vienna, AT	2017
LE NOUVEAU CHUM, Montreal, QC	AERMQ: Design innovateur	Montreal, CA	2017
LE NOUVEAU CHUM, Montreal, QC	AZ Awards: Lighting Installation	Toronto, CA	2017
LE NOUVEAU CHUM, Montreal, QC	WAN Awards: Metal in Architecture, Healthcare (finalist)	London, UK	2017
LE NOUVEAU CHUM, Montreal, QC	Architizer A+ Awards	New-York, USA	2016
LE NOUVEAU CHUM, Montreal, QC	A' Design Award	Como, IT	2016
LE NOUVEAU CHUM, Montreal, QC	LEAF: Urban Design (finalist)	London, UK	2016
LE NOUVEAU CHUM, Montreal, QC	World Architecture Festival: Future Health Project (finalist)	Berlin, DE	2016
LE NOUVEAU CHUM, Montreal, QC	Canadian Council for Private Public Partnership	Toronto, CA	2015
PROMENADES GATINEAU, Gatineau, QC	ICSC Canadian Shopping Centre Awards: Grand Opening, Expansion & Renovation	Toronto, CA	2016
BIODÔME MIGRATION, Montreal, QC	International competition for the Biodome: Winning team	Montreal, CA	2015
BIODÔME MIGRATION, Montreal, QC	Canadian Architect Award of Excellence	Toronto, CA	2015
AIMIA-ALTORIA TOWER, Montreal, QC	Prix d'excellence en architecture de l'Ordre des Architectes du Québec: Mention accessibilité universelle	Montreal, CA	2015
NEUF OFFICES, Montreal, QC	Grands Prix du Design	Montreal, CA	2013
NEUF OFFICES, Montreal, QC	Grand Prix Grafika: Nouvelle identité	Montreal, CA	2013
NEUF OFFICES, Montreal, QC	Asia Pacific Interior Design Award for Elite: Bronze	Montreal, CA	2013
SCHLÜTER SYSTEMS, Sainte-Anne-de-Bellevue, QC	Concours Energia : Bâtiment neuf - Reconnaissance Hydro-Québec	Quebec, CA	2013
SCHLÜTER SYSTEMS, Sainte-Anne-de-Bellevue, QC	Prix excellence OAQ : Bâtiments industriels + 5M$ (3e prix)	Quebec, CA	2011
SCHLÜTER SYSTEMS, Sainte-Anne-de-Bellevue, QC	Prix excellence ICCA: Bâtiment vert	Quebec, CA	2011
ESTÉREL SUITES ET SPA, Estérel, QC	Grands Prix du Tourisme Québécois	Quebec, CA	2014
ESTÉREL SUITES ET SPA, Estérel, QC	Grands Prix du Tourisme Québécois	Quebec, CA	2012
JC PERREAULT, Laval, QC	Grands Prix du Design : Magasin à rayons	Montreal, CA	2012
1200 DE MAISONNEUVE OUEST, Montreal, QC	Concours Armatura : Résidentiel	Montreal, CA	2006
MONT-TREMBLANT RESORT, Mont-Tremblant, QC	Centre de villégiature no.1 dans l'est de l'Amérique du Nord	Mont-Tremblant, CA	1996 to 2012 / 2014 to 2017
