= Dundonald, Saskatoon =

Dundonald
- Neighbourhood
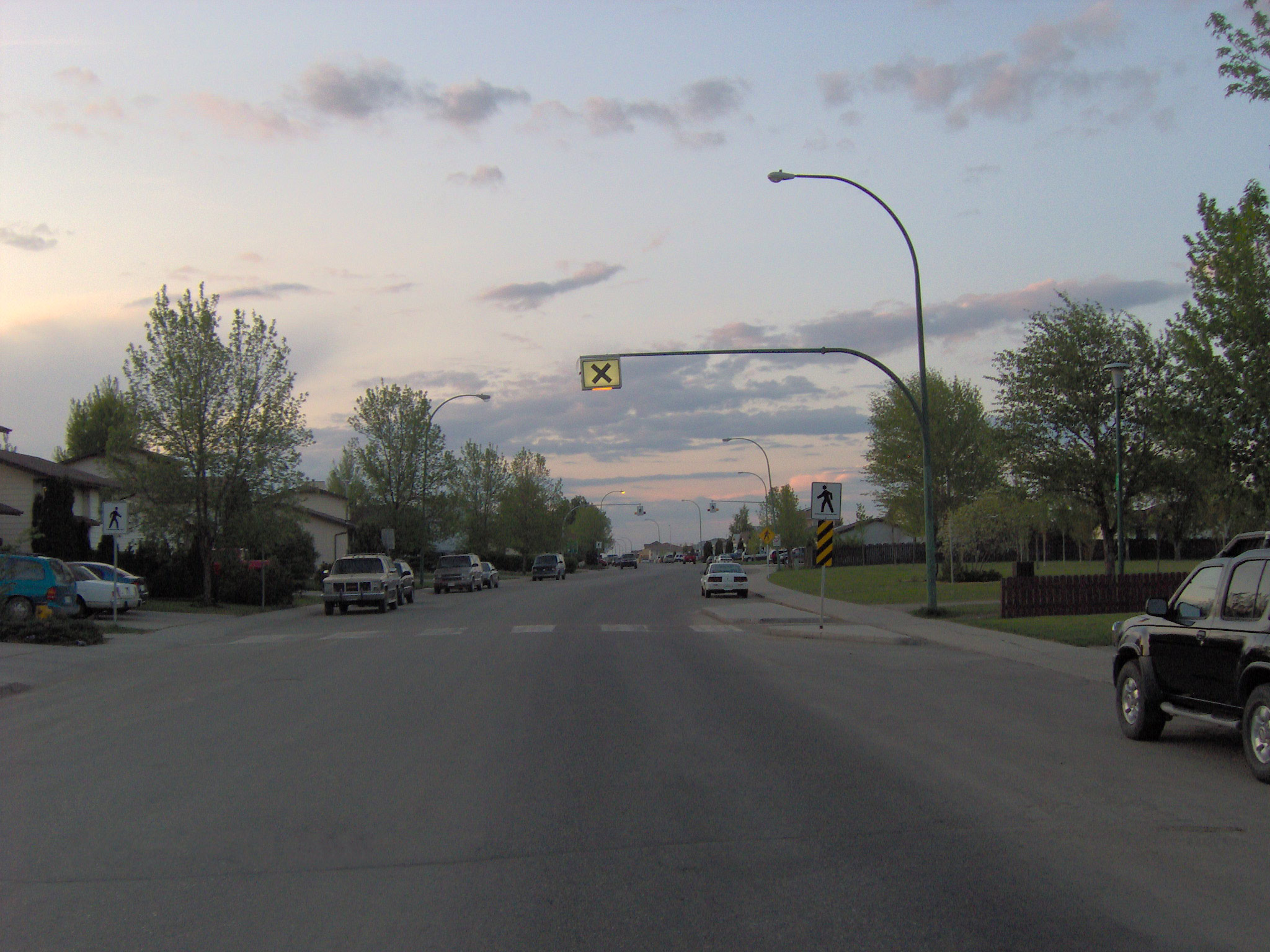
- Dundonald Streetscape
- Interactive map of Dundonald
- Coordinates: 52°8′49″N 106°43′37″W
- Country: Canada
- Province: Saskatchewan
- City: Saskatoon
- Suburban Development Area: Confederation SDA
- Neighbourhood: Dundonald

Government
  - Type: Municipal (Ward 4)
  - Administrative body: Saskatoon City Council
  - Councillor: Troy Davies
- Time zone: UTC-6 (UTC)

Dundonald is a neighbourhood located in the northwest corner of Saskatoon, Saskatchewan. The neighbourhood was built in the 1980s, and served as the last development of the northwest corner of the city, prior to the development of Hampton Village. Dundonald is surrounded by a large landscaped park, with a storm pond. In comparison, the neighbourhood of Dundonald with a 2001 census population of 5,285 is larger than the Saskatchewan city of Melville which had a population of 4,149 in 2006, and 4,453 in 2001 and Dundonald is also larger than the provincial city of Humboldt which was 4,998 in 2006, and 5,161 in 2001. In Saskatchewan rural towns must maintain a population above 5,000 to apply for city status.

== History ==
The land was annexed for Dundonald between 1975 and 1979, and construction began in the early to mid 1980s and reached full build out in the mid-1990s . The community is named after Dundonald Avenue, a major arterial street that for years marked the western boundary of development in Saskatoon. The construction of the Circle Drive freeway resulted in Dundonald Avenue being removed between 11th and 33rd Streets. This left behind two segments of the roadway (Dundonald Avenue North and Dundonald Avenue South), with the northern segment forming the eastern boundary of the Dundonald community. When construction got underway on the neighbourhood, however, the northern stretch of Dundonald Avenue was renamed Junor Avenue in honour of Don Junor, a longtime businessman and civic leader in Saskatoon who was also a city councillor, which fit the criteria for street naming in the community (see below).

The name Dundonald was also at one point assigned to a proposed Dundonald Suburban Centre where 22nd Street intersected with Dundonald Avenue/Circle Drive. This ultimately evolved into the Confederation Urban Centre. Prior to that, however, Dundonald was also plotted as a potential neighbourhood in the 1913 planning document by City Commissioner Christopher J. Yorath, approximately where the final community is today.

== Government and politics ==
Dundonald exists within the federal electoral district of Saskatoon West. It is currently represented by Brad Redekopp of the Conservative Party of Canada, first elected in 2019.

Provincially, the area is within the constituency of Saskatoon Westview. It is currently represented by David Buckingham of the Saskatchewan Party, first elected in 2016.

In Saskatoon's non-partisan municipal politics, Dundonald lies within ward 4. It is currently represented by Troy Davies, first elected in 2012.

== Education ==
École Dundonald School
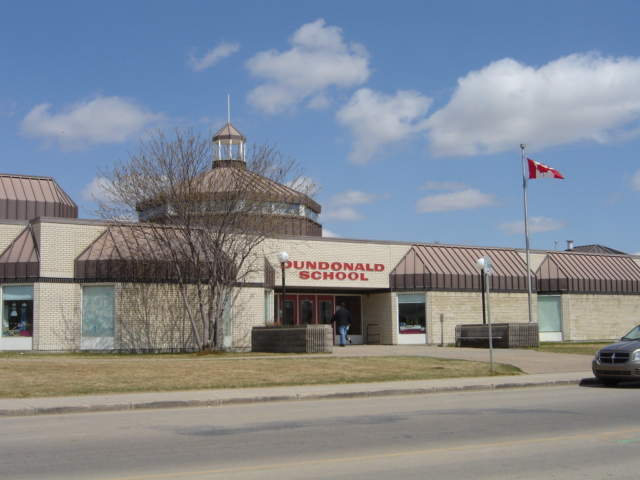

Location
- 162 Wedge Road; Saskatoon, Saskatchewan, S7L 6Y4; Canada

Information
- Type: Elementary
- Opened: 1987
- School board: Saskatoon Public School Division
- Principal: Sharon Champ
- Grades: Kindergarten to Grade 8
- Enrollment: 482 (2017)
- Education system: Public
- Language: English, French Immersion
- Feeder to: Tommy Douglas Collegiate
- Website: Dundonald School

École St. Peter School
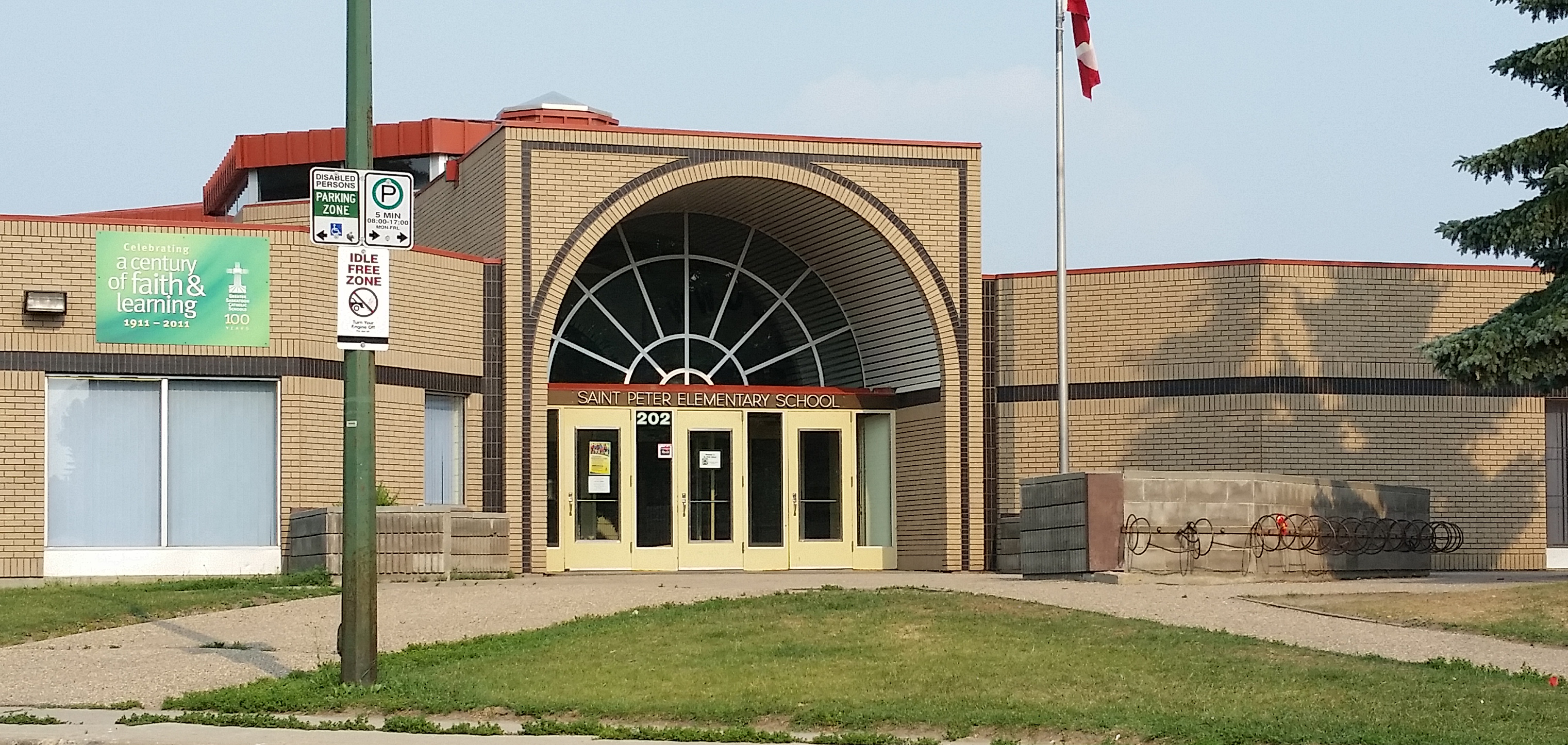

Location
- 202 Sumner Crescent; Saskatoon, Saskatchewan, S7L 7A4; Canada

Information
- Type: Elementary
- Religious affiliation: Catholic
- Opened: 1985
- School board: Greater Saskatoon Catholic Schools
- Principal: Shawn Lorenz
- Grades: Kindergarten to Grade 8
- Enrollment: 474 (2017)
- Education system: Separate
- Language: English, French Immersion
- Feeder to: Bethlehem High School
- Website: St. Peter School

- École Dundonald School - public elementary, part of the Saskatoon Public School Division
- École St. Peter School - separate (Catholic) elementary, part of Greater Saskatoon Catholic Schools

== Area Parks ==
- Dundonald Park 19.31 acres (78,100 m^{2})
- Princess Diana Multi-District Park

== Transportation ==
=== City Transit ===
Dundonald is serviced by the City Transit Bus Route Saskatoon Transit; Route 7: City Center - Dundonald/Confederation Terminal & Route 22: City Center (Peak Times Only).

== Layout ==
33rd Street is to the south and 37th Street to the north, and whereas these two streets run parallel to each other, there are no other numbered streets throughout the neighbourhood, Originally the grid layout was going to continue before the city decided to develop with the crescents and cul-de-sac layout instead. This neighbourhood constructed in the 1980s abandoned the grid style of road layout, leaving 33rd & 37th Streets the remaining numeric ones in the neighbourhood. Junor Avenue marks the eastern boundary and Hughes Drive serves as the western boundary, while 37th Street is the northern boundary and 33rd Street serves as the southern boundary.

The street names honour former City councillors.

List of Dundonald Roads
Road name	City Councillor
Bowman Lane, Crt, Crescent	Bowman, Aden (1941–1952); Bowman, Lillie F. (1955–1964)
Carrothers Court	Carrothers, W.A. (1930)
Flavelle Court, Crescent	Flavelle, W.T.A. (1953–54, 1961–66)
George Road	Alexander, George
Heggie Court, Crescent	Heggie, Robert A. (1954–1963)
Hughes Drive	Hughes, Helen (1976–1980)
Hunt Road	Hunt, George L. (1952–1954)
Junor Avenue (formerly Dundonald Avenue North)	Junor, Donald (1968–1979)
Kirkpatrick Court, Crescent	Kirkpatrick, W.P. (1923–1924)
Latrace Road	Latrace, Harold (1964–1967)
Lennon Crescent	Lennon, Thomas George (1973–1976)
Makaroff Road	Makaroff, P.G. (1939)
Manning Crescent, Lane	Manning, W.G. (1947–1951, 1954–1957)
McCann Way	McCann, Peter (1982–85, 1991–2000)
Murray Place	Murray, George (1928–1929)
Nesbitt Lane, Way, Crescent	Nesbitt, W.G. (1948–1957)
Nixon Crescent	Nixon, Howard (1982–1985)
O'Regan Court, Crescent	O'Regan, W.B. (1931–1934)
Robinson Crescent	Robinson, Gladys (1965)
Stacey Court, Crescent	Stacey, Francis L. (1954–1956)
Sumner Place, Lane, Crescent	Sumner, A.J.E. (1943–1945)
Ward Road, Court	Ward, George (1968–1970)
Wedge Road	Wedge, J.B. (1961–68, 1971–72)

== Shopping ==
- Dundonald Neighbourhood Commercial Centre (located at Wedge & George Roads)

In the neighbouring subdivisions there is also these retail experiences.

- Confederation Park Urban Centre, which includes Confederation Mall
- 22nd Street Arterial Commercial District
- 33rd Street Arterial Commercial District
- Blairmore Urban Centre

=== See also ===
- List of shopping malls in Saskatoon

== Recreation ==
In the neighbouring subdivision this facility is very nearby.

- Cosmo Civic Centre & Ice Arena and Carlyle King Branch Library

== Life ==
Dundonald Community Association maintains the ice rink in Dundonald Park, as well as provides leisure activities at both schools.
