= Montgomery Place, Saskatoon =

Montgomery Place
- Neighbourhood
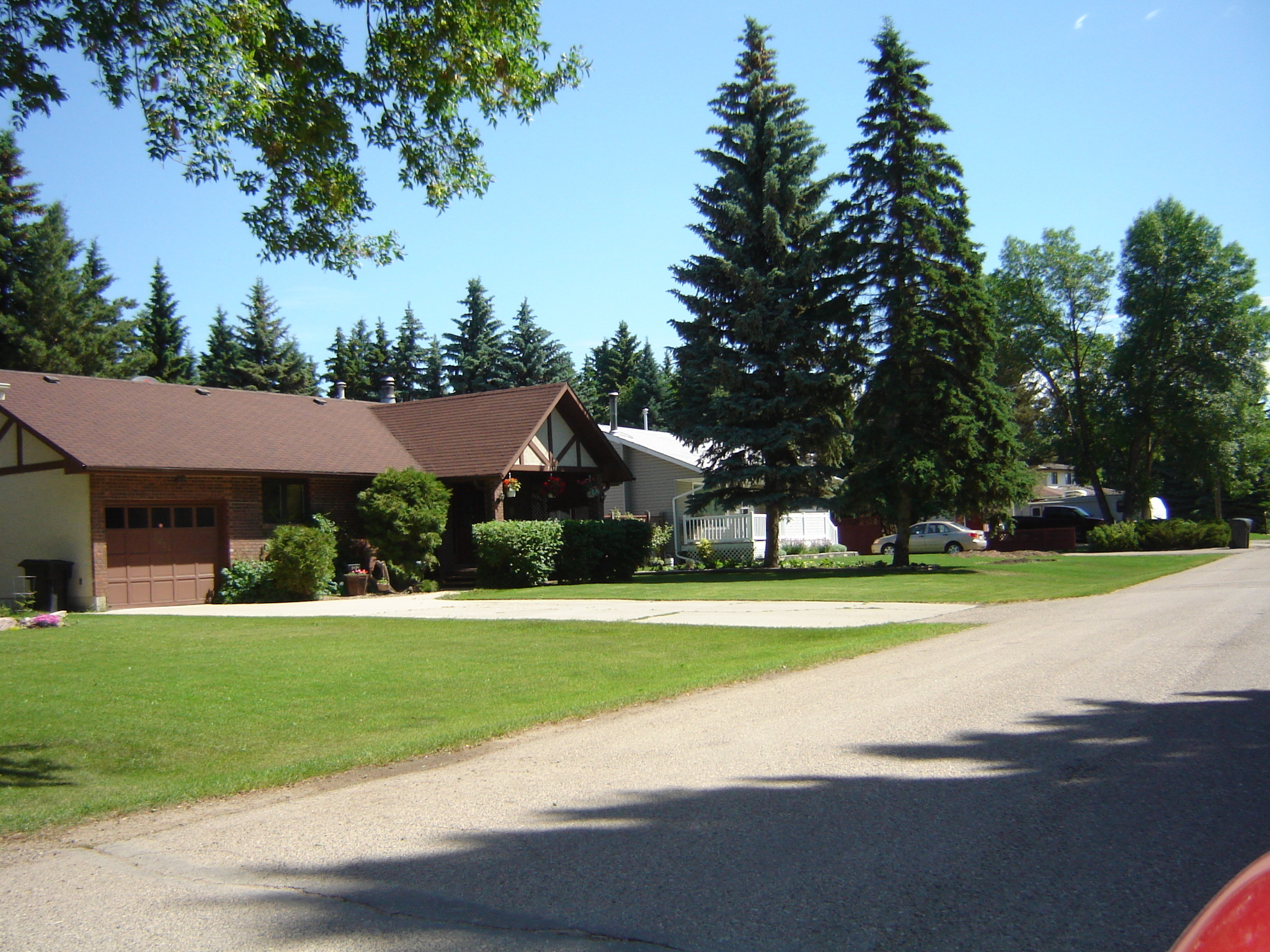
- Street in Montgomery Place, Saskatoon
- Interactive map of Montgomery Place
- Coordinates: 52°6′40″N 106°43′44″W
- Country: Canada
- Province: Saskatchewan
- City: Saskatoon
- Suburban Development Area: Confederation SDA
- Neighbourhood: Montgomery Place

Government
  - Type: Municipal (Ward 2)
  - Administrative body: Saskatoon City Council
  - Councillor: Hilary Gough

Area
  - Total: 1.7 km^{2} (0.66 sq mi)

Population (2009)
  - Total: 2,649
  - Density: 1,600/km^{2} (4,000/sq mi)
  - Average Income: $94,446
- Time zone: UTC-6 (UTC)
- Website: Montgomery Place

Montgomery Place is a post-World War II community erected for veterans outside Saskatoon, Saskatchewan, Canada, that consists primarily of residential homes. It was amalgamated within the city of Saskatoon in 1956, and is now a National Historic Site. Montgomery Place has an average household size of 3.2 persons, and homeownership is at 93.7%. According to MLS data, the average sale price of a home as of 2013 was $403,840. It was named in honour of Field Marshal The 1st Viscount Montgomery of Alamein, the famous Ulster Scots commander in the British Army during the Second World War.

== History ==
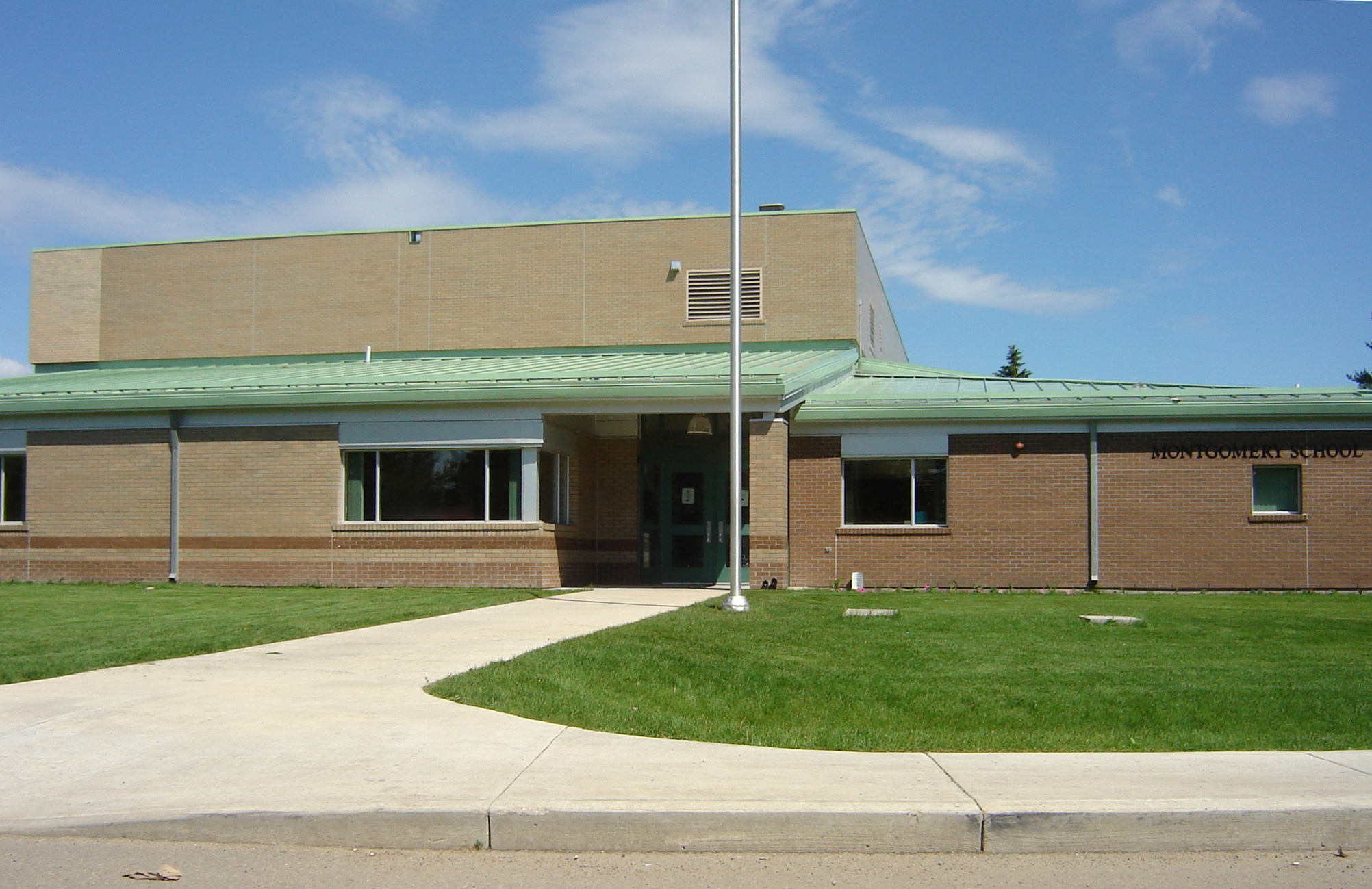
Montgomery School after the 2003 expansion. The original entrance was at 3229 Caen Street. After the expansion, the school changed its address to 3220 Ortona Street. Montgomery School is located at the corner of Ortona Street & Currie Avenue

Plans for a community on the current site of Montgomery Place date back to the May 1912 "Saskatoon and Environs Map" published by Commercial Map and Blue Printing, which sketched out proposed neighbourhoods far beyond the then-current boundaries of the young city. What is today's Montgomery Place carried the name River Heights then (a name given to another city neighbourhood decades later).

Most of this neighbourhood was built after World War II as a part of the Veterans' Land Act settlement plan; at the time, the land was still located outside Saskatoon's city limits. Ten years later in 1955 it became a neighbourhood of Saskatoon The area was designated a National Historic Site on July 4, 2016. It was named after Field Marshal Lord Montgomery - 'Monty' - and most street names honour notable people and places associated with the war.

This monument commemorates the Canadian Forces veterans who built their homes here during the years 1946–77. Montgomery Place was established with small land holdings under the Federal Government;s Veteran's Land Act for men and women returning from World War II and the Korean War. Dedicated September 16, 1999

— Image Origins of Montgomery Place

Field Marshal B.L. Montgomery (1887–1976) Montgomery was one of the most inspirational British military leaders of the Second World War. After significant victories over German General Erwin Rommel in North Africa (1942–1944), he was promoted to Field Marshal in command of British and Canadian troops. Montgomery presided over the Battles of Arnhem and Normandy and accepted the formal surrender of the German military at Luneburg Heath on May 4, 1945. His flair for command and the absolute belief in his infallibility made him a legendary, if not always popular, leader.

— Image B.L. Montgomery

Lt. Colonel Cecil Merritt (1908–1991) Lt. Col. Cecil Merritt won the first Victoria Cross given to a Canadian in WWII for gallantry and inspired leadership during the disastrous raid in Dieppe. He landed with the South Saskatchewan Regiment at Pourville on August 19, 1942. To capture important high ground to the east, they had to cross the Scie by a bridge under heavy fire. Seeing the situations, Merritt walked on to the bridge, waved his helmet to encourage his men, and shouted: "Come on over, there's nothing to worry about here." After hours of heavy fighting, Merritt and his men were taken captive. Merritt was commended for his leadership while a prisoner.

— Image Cecil Merritt

=== Future expansion ===
The neighbourhood was considered to have reached full build-out in the early 1980s, however in the years since some additions have occurred. Current (2013) development plans for the region call for an expansion of Montgomery Place to the west of Chappell Drive, with additional residential development (previously, the area had been earmarked for a light industrial district). Beginning in 2012, construction of residential development north of 11th Street and south of the 11th Street Bypass (constructed as part of the South Circle Drive project) began, which has added the first apartment-style multi-family developments to the community. No time frame has been presented on the western expansion. With the completion of Circle Drive, there is also potential future development land available on the west side of Dundonald Avenue, which as of 2013 no longer connects to Valley Road or the City Landfill and has a number of lots that were left vacant for decades due to uncertainty over the eventual outcome of the Circle Drive alignment.

The community established a new law prohibiting subdivision of lots, in an effort to keep large spacious yards a tradition for many years to come.

== Layout ==
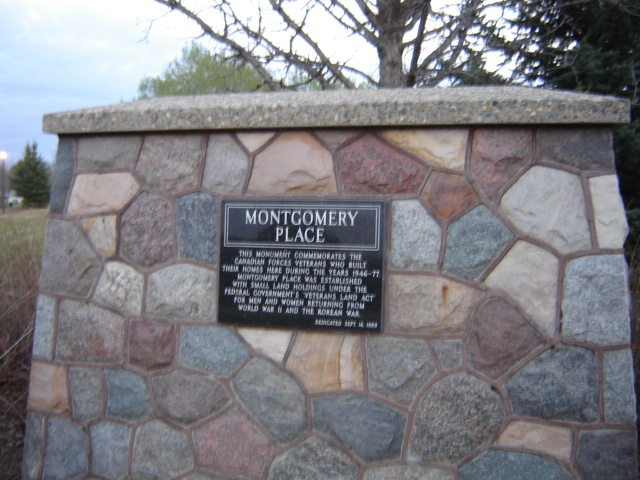
Origins of Montgomery Place, Saskatoon, located in Montgomery Park at the corner of Rockingham Avenue & Caen Street

11th Street and the new 11th Street Bypass are the northernmost roads in Montgomery Place. Chappell Drive is the furthest west road at present, whereas Dundonald Avenue and the southwest extension of Circle Drive lie to the east (Dundonald formerly linked south to Valley Road and Spadina Crescent, but is now closed at Mountbatten Street). The southern boundary of the community's residential development is denoted by Burma Road, a private (non-City of Saskatoon) roadway servicing the CN Rail yards on the south side of Montgomery Place. The neighbourhood is a conglomeration of streets and avenues in near grid fashion combined with crescents. The neighbourhood naming practices honour the history and theaters of World War II.

The city's main rail yard and passenger station is located on the south side of Montgomery Place, and the northern side of the community is in the shadow of the Viterra Grain Terminal (formerly known as Canadian Government Elevators and later AgPro), one of the city's iconic landmarks.

== Streets ==
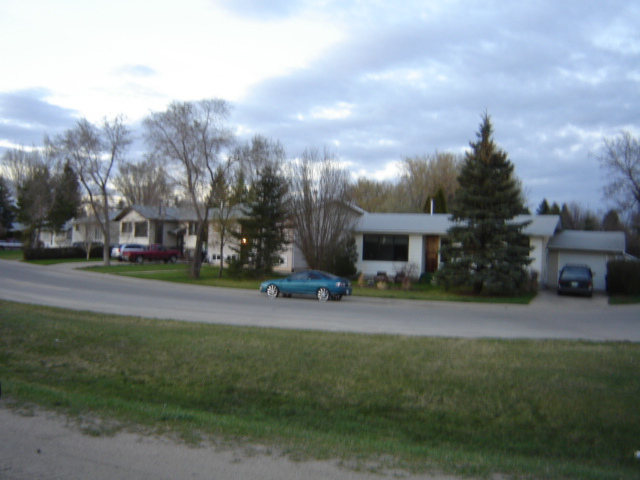
Newer area of Montgomery Place, Saskatoon. This is at the corner of McNaughton Avenue and Ortona Street

The following streets are located in this area:

11th Street West/11th Street Bypass, Caen Street, Arnhem Street, Normandy Street, Ortona Street, Merritt Street, Dieppe Street, Mountbatten Street, Currie Avenue, McNaughton Avenue, Elevator Road, Rockingham Avenue, Haida Avenue, Simonds Avenue, Cassino Avenue & Place, Crerar Drive, Crescent Boulevard, Lancaster Boulevard & Crescent, Bader Crescent, Dundonald Avenue, Chappell Drive, Burma Road.

Burma Road, a private roadway, runs east-to-west between the residential development of Montgomery Place and the rail yards to the south. The road did not appear on official city maps prior to 2012, but was recognized by Google Maps, and unofficial street signs were erected. Beginning in 2013, the City of Saskatoon's official street map shows it, even though it is not open for public traffic.

As noted above, most streets take their names from locations and individuals connected to the first two world wars. Exceptions include Crescent Boulevard (a generic name) and Elevator Road (named for the large grain terminal it leads to). In the 1960s, Crerar Drive was named Central Drive, but this was changed due to confusion over the similarly named Central Avenue in Sutherland.

A notable aspect of many older roadways within Montgomery Place is the lack of sidewalks. Several older streets within the community also were left unpaved for many years due to a stated desire by residents of the day to keep property taxes low.

== Government and politics ==
Montgomery Place exists within the federal electoral district of Saskatoon West. It is currently represented by Sheri Benson of the New Democratic Party, first elected in 2015.

Provincially, the area is within the constituency of Saskatoon Riversdale. It is currently represented by Danielle Chartier of the Saskatchewan New Democratic Party, first elected in 2009.

In Saskatoon's non-partisan municipal politics, Montgomery Place lies within ward 2. It is currently represented by Hilary Gough, first elected in 2016.

== Education ==
Montgomery School
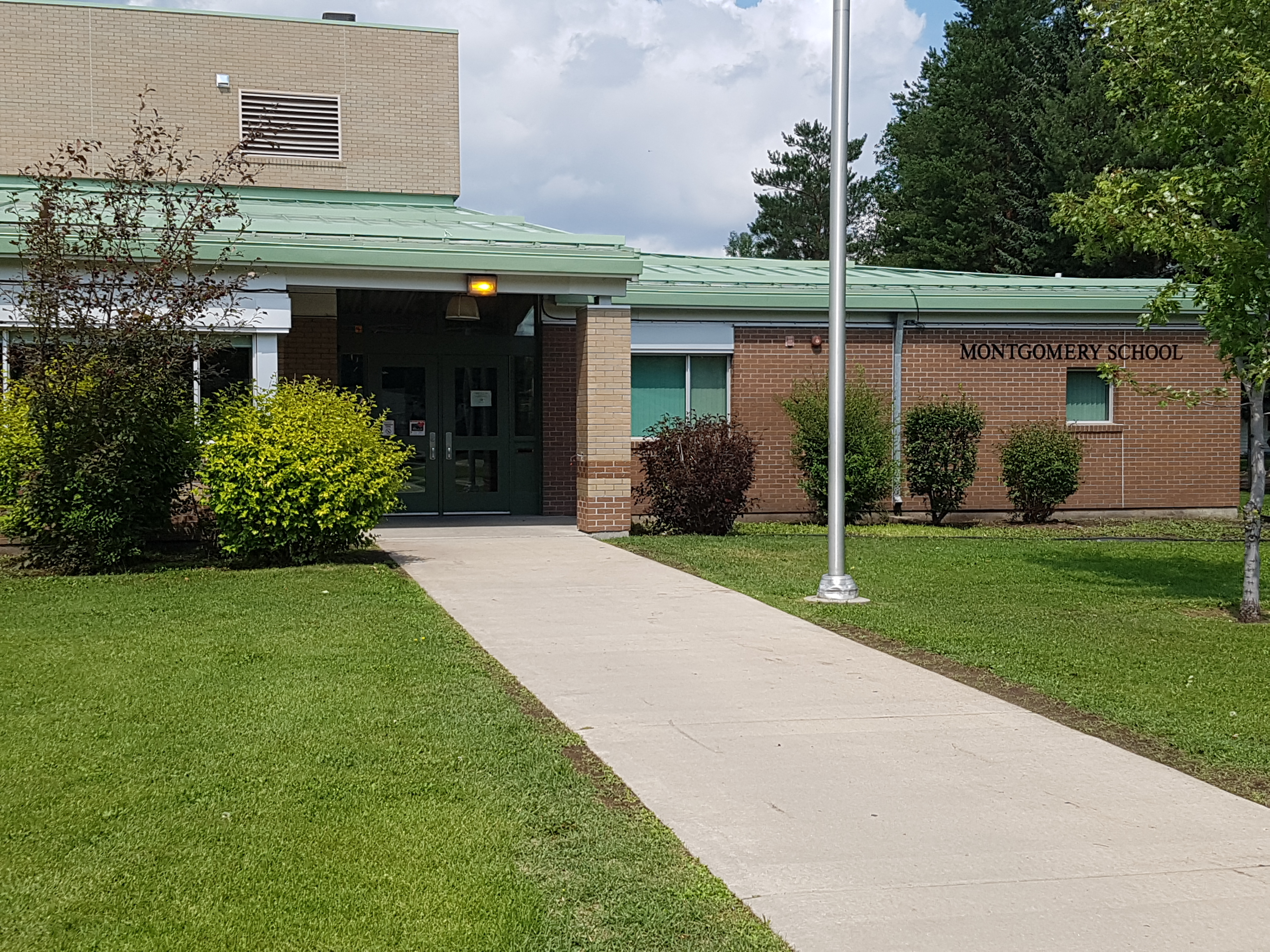

Location
- 3220 Ortona Street; Saskatoon, Saskatchewan, S7M 3R6; Canada; 52°06′44″N 106°43′39″W

Information
- Type: Elementary
- School board: Saskatoon Public School Division
- Principal: Hugh Hamilton
- Enrollment: 295 (2017)
- Education system: Public
- Language: English
- Feeder to: Tommy Douglas Collegiate
- Website: Montgomery School

St. Dominic School
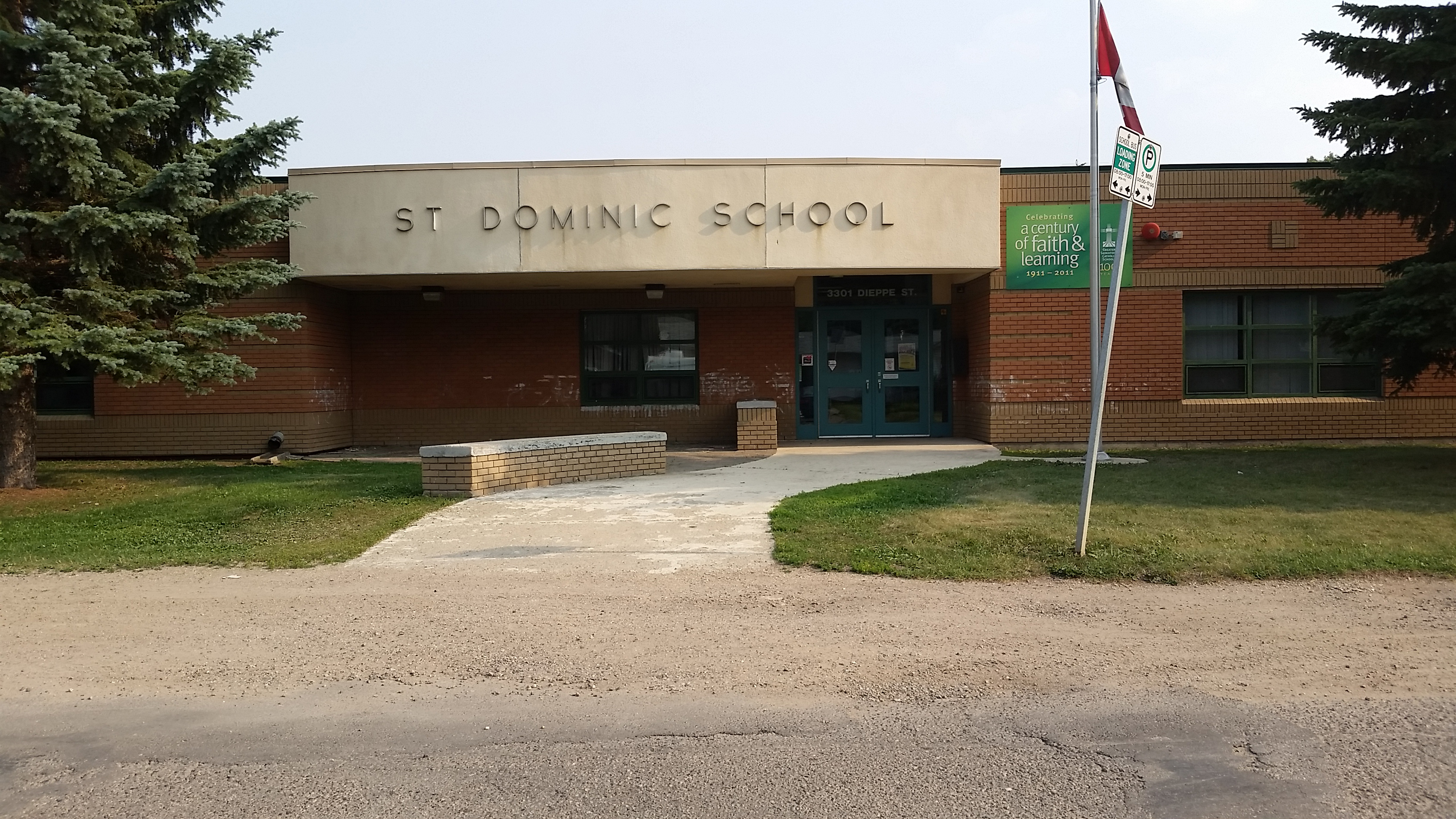

Location
- 3301 Dieppe Street; Saskatoon, Saskatchewan, S7M 3S6; Canada; 52°06′33″N 106°43′47″W

Information
- Type: Elementary
- Religious affiliation: Catholic
- Opened: 1964
- School board: Greater Saskatoon Catholic Schools
- Principal: Jennifer Millar
- Grades: Kindergarten to Grade 8
- Enrollment: 148 (2017)
- Education system: Separate
- Language: English
- Feeder to: Bethlehem High School
- Website: St. Dominic School

- Montgomery School - public elementary, part of the Saskatoon Public School Division
- St. Dominic School - separate (Catholic) elementary, part of Greater Saskatoon Catholic Schools

== Commercial area ==
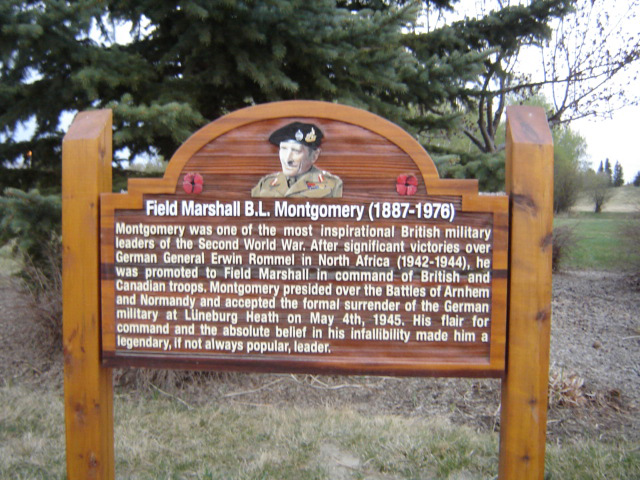
B.L. Montgomery, Namesake. Montgomery Place, Saskatoon

The Confederation Urban Centre is the closest large retail center and contains 400 operating businesses which is 8% of Saskatoon's retail sector. The Blairmore Urban Centre is under development. Montgomery residents can directly access the former via Circle Drive and the latter via 11th Street and the realigned Highway 7.

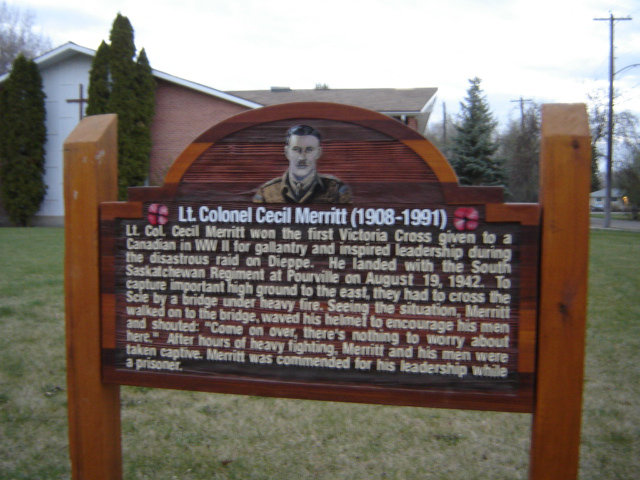
Cecil Merritt. Montgomery Place, Saskatoon this plaque can be found at the corner of Merritt Street and Rockingham Avenue on the St. David's Trinity United Church property

== Community events ==
The annual Montgomery Garage Sale occurs on the first Saturday in May. By all measures, this is the largest community garage sale in Saskatoon. Many community groups use the event as an opportunity to host fundraising barbecues and bake sales. Traffic within the neighbourhood is often abnormally congested during this event.

In addition, Montgomery Place hosts a Remembrance Day ceremony each year in Montgomery Park. Given its unique history as a veteran's neighbourhood (as reflected by many of the street names), there is always overwhelming community support for the service.

== Area parks ==
- Gougeon Park 2.26 acres (9,100 m^{2})
- Lt. Col. Drayton Walker Park 1.93 acres (7,800 m^{2})
- Lt. Gen. G.G. Simonds Park 2.76 acres (11,200 m^{2})
- Montgomery Park 8.32 acres (33,700 m^{2})

== Other recreation ==
- The CN Curling Club is located on Chappell Drive on the west side of the community.

== Transportation ==
=== City transit ===
Saskatoon Transit serves the neighbourhood with regular bus service. Route 22: Montgomery

=== Rail ===
Via Rail's Saskatoon passenger station is located off the southwest corner of the community, having been relocated there from downtown Saskatoon in the 1960s.
