= Parkridge, Saskatoon =

Parkridge
- Neighbourhood
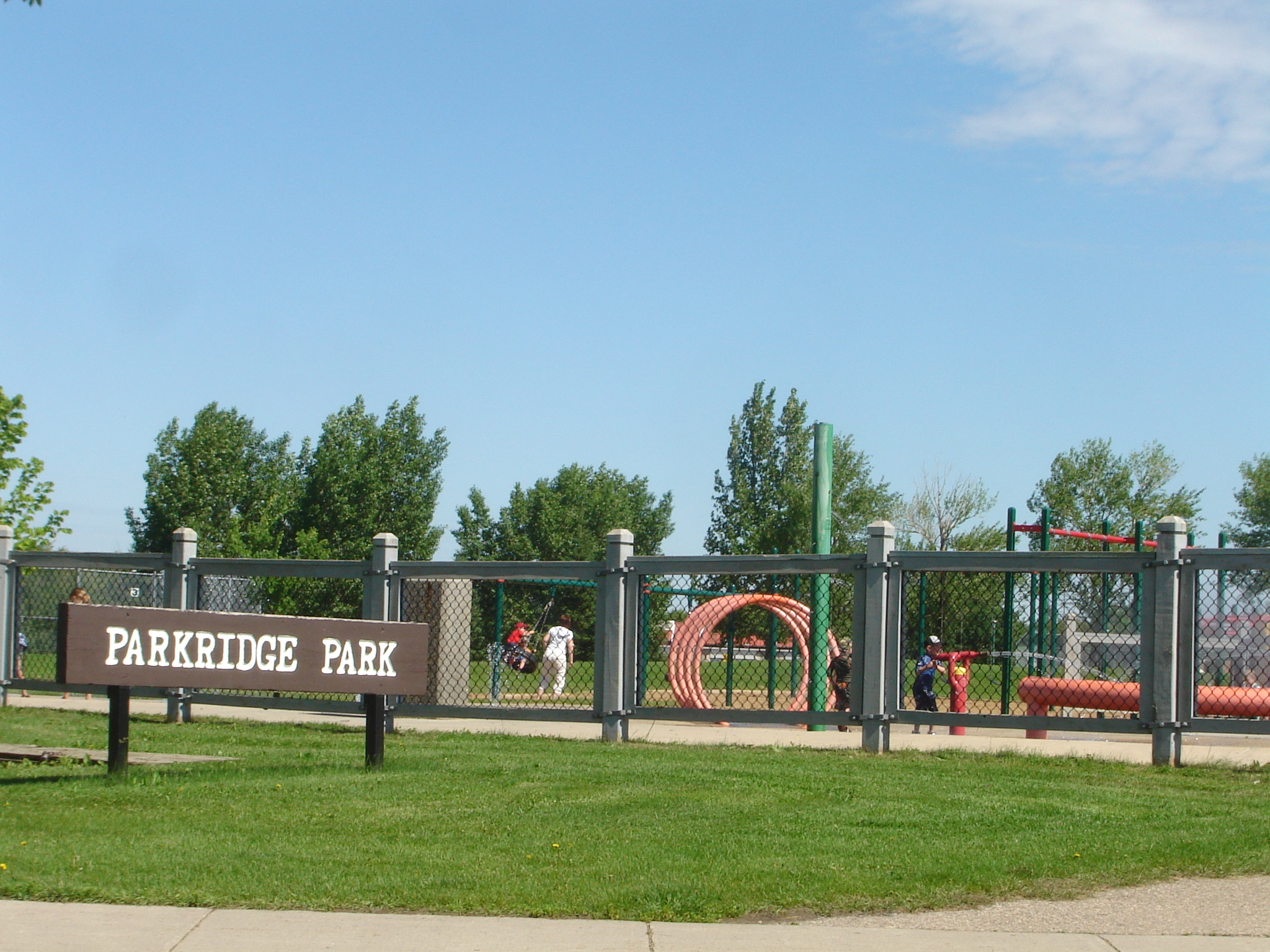
- Parkridge Park
- Interactive map of Parkridge
- Coordinates: 52°07′24″N 106°44′47″W
- Country: Canada
- Province: Saskatchewan
- City: Saskatoon
- Suburban Development Area: Confederation SDA
- Neighbourhood: Parkridge

Government
  - Type: Municipal (Ward 3)
  - Administrative body: Saskatoon City Council
  - Councillor: David Kirton

Population (2006)
  - Total: 4,500
  - Average Income: $58,944
- Time zone: UTC−6 (UTC)

Parkridge is a residential community in western Saskatoon, Saskatchewan, located on land annexed by the city between 1975 and 1979. Development of the subdivision initially began in the early 1980s. The extreme west end of the neighbourhood remained undeveloped until the subsequent creation of the adjacent Blairmore Urban Centre led to the final phase of Parkridge being built out in the early 2010s. Whereas the majority of residents are employed in the sales and service sector, the next highest employer is business, finance and administration. The two main age groups are those in their 40s and teenagers as of 2005. Until recently, Parkridge was the farthest western neighbourhood of Saskatoon south of 22nd Street. However, new construction will soon see Neighbourhood 2 of the Blairmore SDA bear that distinction. In comparison, the neighbourhood of Parkridge with a 2001 census population of 4,505 is larger than the Saskatchewan city of Melville which had a population of 4,149 in 2006, and 4,453 in 2001 and Parkridge is a little smaller than the provincial city of Humboldt which was 4,998 in 2006, and 5,161 in 2001. In Saskatchewan rural towns must maintain a population above 5,000 to apply for city status. According to MLS data, the average sale price of a home as of 2013 was $327,072.

== History ==
Most roadways are named after those people who contributed significantly to the City of Saskatoon.

List of Parkridge Roadways
Street Name	Resident	Contribution
Postnikoff Cres.		
Grooper Cres.		
Blue Place		
Poth Way, Cres.		
Gooding Pl, Cres.		
Heise Cres.		
Fairburn Crt		
Fortosky Cres., Manor, Terr.	Owen Fortosky	city councillor
Fusedale Terr.		
Needham Cres., Way	Needham, C.A. (1928–1929)	City councillor
Neatby Cres., Pl.	Hilda Neatby	Head of the Dept. of History (1958–69)
Podiluk Crt.	Dr. Walter Podiluk, C.M., LL.D. (Hon.)	Saskatoon Catholic schools board of Education
Strumm Terr.	Strumm, Gil	Saskatoon Sports Hall of Fame in 1986.
Cory Pl.		
Arrand Cres.	James and Walter Arrand	Saskatoon contractors
Batoche Cr.	Xavier Letendre dit Batoche	Village founder
Blackley Pl.	David Blackley	Temperance Colony Pioneer
Skuce Pl.		
Caldwell Pl. Crt. Cres.	Jessie Caldwell, B.Sc.	Canadian Achiever by the Government of Canada
Smith Cr., Pl., Road		
Borland Pl.		
Whitecap Terr. Pl. Cres.	Chief Whitecap (Wapahska)	Friend and guide of Saskatoon founder John Lake
Sherry Cres., Way, Pl. Crt.		
McCormack Road		
Wrigley Cres.	James Brooke Wrigley; Eleanor Wrigley	real estate business, J.P. & etc.
Streb Cres. Way		

== Education ==
James L. Alexander School
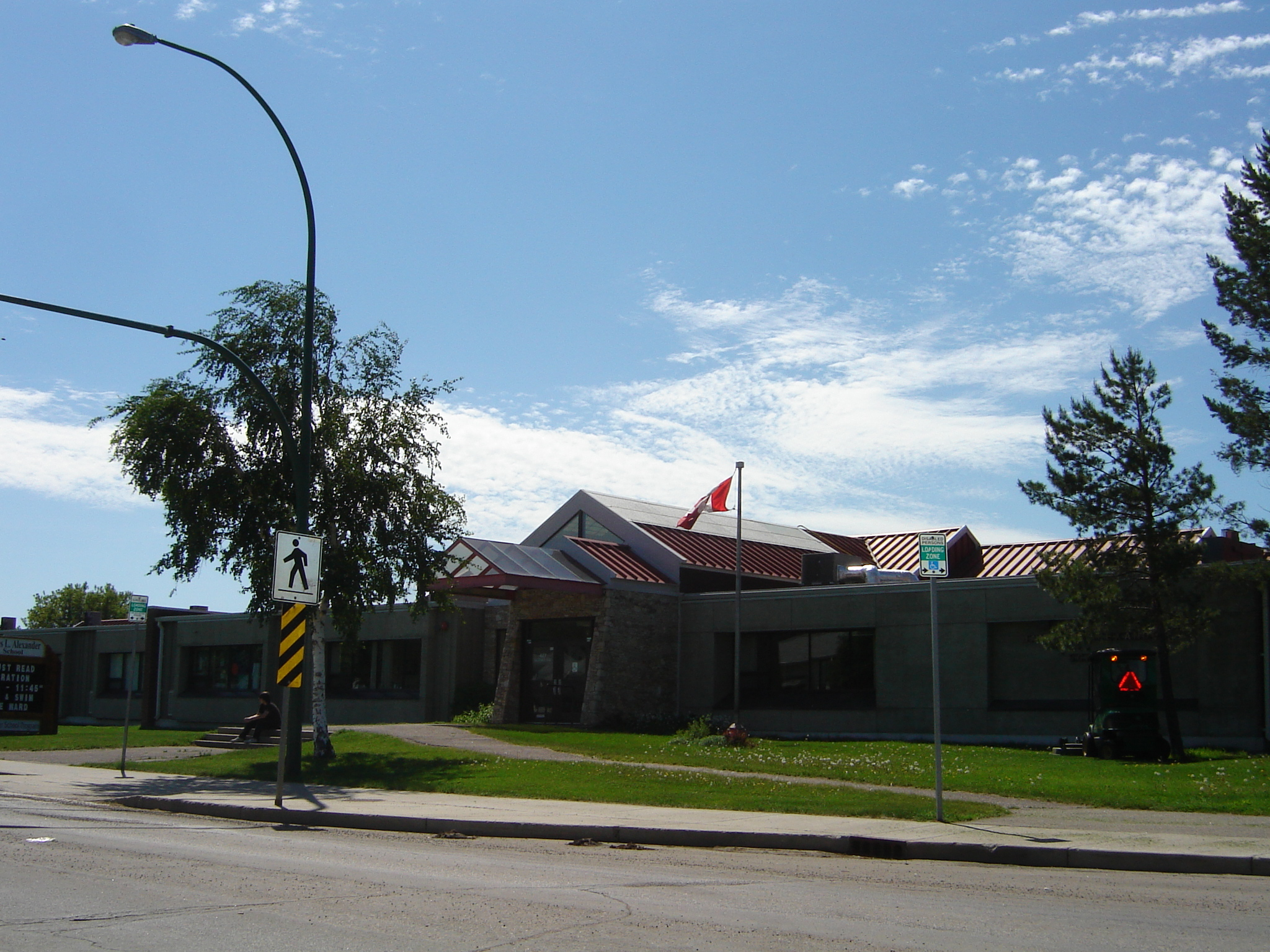

Location
- 427 McCormack Road; Saskatoon, Saskatchewan, S7M 5L8; Canada

Information
- Type: Elementary
- School board: Saskatoon Public School Division
- Principal: Chandra Gerich
- Grades: Kindergarten to Grade 8
- Enrollment: 353 (2017)
- Education system: Public
- Language: English
- Feeder to: Tommy Douglas Collegiate
- Website: James L. Alexander School

St. Marguerite School
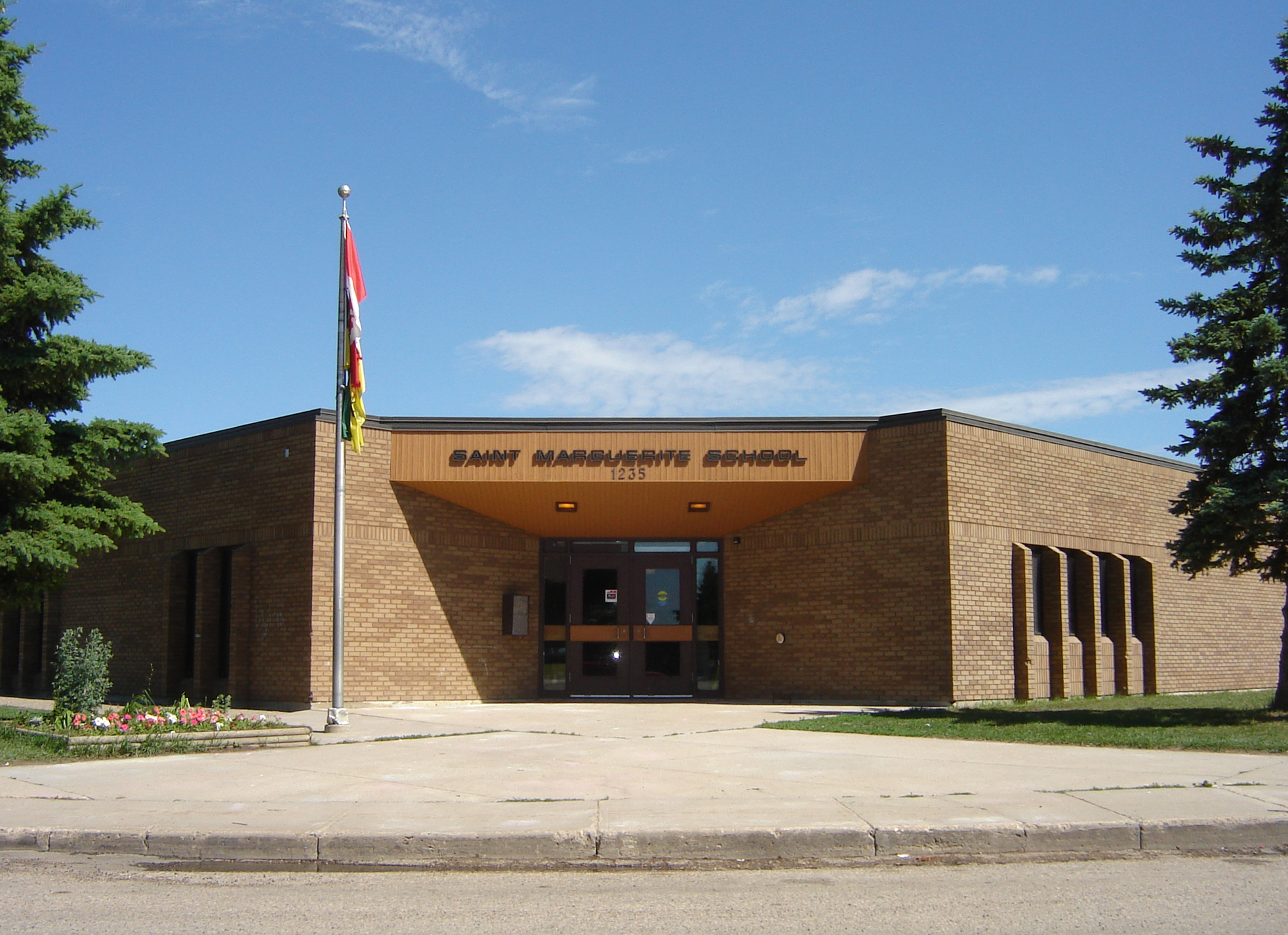

Location
- 1235 McCormack Road; Saskatoon, Saskatchewan, S7M 5L6; Canada

Information
- Type: Elementary
- Religious affiliation: Catholic
- Opened: 1983
- School board: Greater Saskatoon Catholic Schools
- Principal: Sean Brannen
- Grades: Kindergarten to Grade 8
- Enrollment: 428 (2017)
- Education system: Separate
- Language: English
- Feeder to: Bethlehem High School
- Website: St. Marguerite School

- James L. Alexander School - public elementary, part of the Saskatoon Public School Division
- St. Marguerite School - separate (Catholic) elementary, part of Greater Saskatoon Catholic Schools

Two high schools, Tommy Douglas Collegiate and Bethlehem Catholic High School, are located in the nearby Blairmore Urban Centre.

== Area parks ==
- Parkridge Park 19.45 acres (78,700 m^{2})
- James Girgulis Park 18.04 acres

Parkridge is serviced by two Saskatoon Transit routes: Route #9 (Riversdale/CityCenter) services the neighbourhood boundary on Fairlight Drive while Route #5 (McComack/City Center) goes west on McCormack Road.

== Government and politics ==
Parkridge exists within the federal electoral district of Saskatoon West. It is currently represented by Brad Redekopp of the Conservative Party of Canada, first elected in 2019.

Provincially, the area is within the constituency of Saskatoon Fairview. It is currently represented by Vicki Mowat of the Saskatchewan New Democratic Party, first elected in a 2017 by-election.

In Saskatoon's non-partisan municipal politics, Parkridge lies within ward 3. It is currently represented by David Kirton, first elected in 2020.

== Layout ==
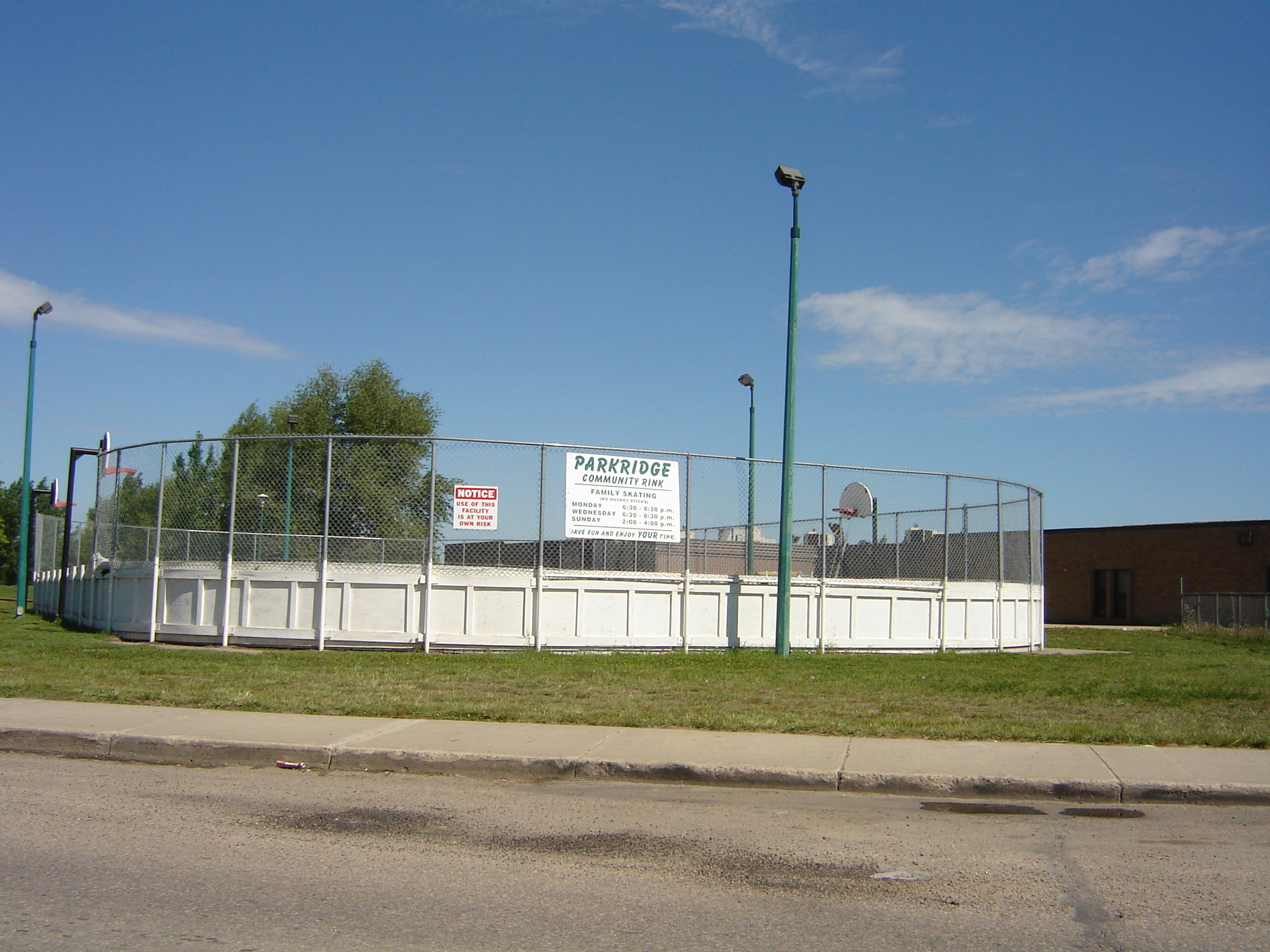
Parkridge Community Rink

Parkridge goes no further west than Highway 7. 22nd Street is the northernmost limit for this neighbourhood. CPR rail line is as far south as this neighbourhood will venture. Fairlight Drive creates a curved eastern boundary. The neighbourhood is of uneven shape, and even though there are main thoroughfares west, south and north, the community nestles around Parkridge Park with courts and crescents. Parkridge Park is centrally located with James L. Alexander School at the north end, and St. Marguerite School at the south end of the park. The community's main access road, McCormack Road, winds through the district. In 2009, the city honored a request to convert the Kinloch development from a crescent to two cul-de-sac streets.

== Development history ==
Parkridge was originally called "Fairhaven I," as it was developed as a residential extension of the neighbouring Fairhaven community. Early construction took place in the late 1970s and 1980s, with another burst of development occurring in 2009–2010, nearly completing the original community plan. In 2015, the Parkridge Extension was approved, introducing 174 new single-unit lots to the south of Hart Road, with linear parks connecting pedestrians to existing pathways and greenspaces. In 2023, the Hart Road Project by Camponi/Sask Native Housing broke ground, with construction underway on the first three of six buildings planned for the Blairmore Urban Centre within the Parkridge Community Association boundaries.

== Amenities and services ==
Parkridge contains no commercial amenities within its boundaries; however, the adjacent Blairmore Urban Centre and SmartCentres Saskatoon West offer nearby shopping, groceries, restaurants, and medical offices. The neighbourhood has two elementary schools: James L. Alexander School (public) and St. Marguerite School (Catholic), the latter also providing an outdoor rink at 1235 McCormack Road. Two high schools — Tommy Douglas Collegiate and Bethlehem Catholic High School — are located directly north in the Blairmore Suburban Centre. The neighbourhood has access to the Shaw Centre, a recreation facility offering aquatic services, fitness facilities, and sports fields.

== Health care ==
Parkridge Centre, located at 110 Gropper Crescent, is a long-term care home operated by the Saskatchewan Health Authority providing residential care for 237 residents across two levels and six neighbourhoods. It offers specialised programs including a Geriatric Re-Enablement Unit, Emergency Respite, Planned Respite, and a Community Day Program for clients living independently in the wider community.

== Housing ==
The housing stock in Parkridge consists predominantly of single-family detached homes, with approximately three-quarters of residents owning their homes. Around half of the properties were built between 1960 and 1980, with most remaining buildings constructed in the 1980s and 2000s. The average home price is approximately $297,000, making it a popular choice for first-time buyers and families.

== Shopping ==
The neighbouring subdivision of Fairhaven hosts a few neighbourhood convenience stores, and a strip mall alongside Confederation Inn. Major commercial development, including hotels and big-box retail, is available in the Blairmore Urban Centre to the immediate northwest. Additional commercial services are to the northeast in the Confederation Urban Centre. Confederation Mall is the closest enclosed shopping centre.

== Amenities ==
The Shaw Centre recreation facility is located to the north of Parkridge in the Blairmore Suburban Centre.

Parkridge Centre is a long-term care facility for 240 residents who vary in age from pre-school to elderly.
