= Pacific Heights, Saskatoon =

Pacific Heights
- Neighbourhood
- Interactive map of Pacific Heights
- Coordinates: 52°08′00″N 106°44′27″W
- Country: Canada
- Province: Saskatchewan
- City: Saskatoon
- Suburban Development Area: Confederation SDA
- Neighbourhood: Pacific Heights

Government
  - Type: Municipal (Ward 3)
  - Administrative body: Saskatoon City Council
  - Councillor: David Kirton

Population (2006)
  - Total: 4,265
  - Average Income: $51,862
- Time zone: UTC−6 (UTC)

Pacific Heights is a neighbourhood geographically located in northwest Saskatoon. The main construction boom for this community was the 1970s, during which the City of Saskatoon annexed the land. Following elementary school, students usually attend Tommy Douglas Collegiate or Bethlehem Catholic High School on Bowlt Crescent a part of Blairmore SDA community. According to MLS data, the average sale price of a home as of 2013 was $279,500.

== Layout ==
Diefenbaker Drive is a main artery which curves around the neighbourhood on both the eastern and the northern limits. Childers Crescent defines the western edge, and the main City thoroughfare of 22nd Street West is the southern perimeter.

=== Abolishment of Monck Avenue ===
The 2012 concept plan for the new community of Kensington, to the west, indicated the neighborhood's westernmost street, Monck Avenue would be abolished, despite having been constructed in the 1970s. The street never had any residential development, due to its status of bordering along the R.M. of Corman Park on the west side.

The City of Saskatoon officially announced the closure in the summer of 2013, following the successful annexation from the R.M. of Corman Park that saw the land from Monck Avenue to Neault Road become part of the city limits.

Due to its lack of residential development and status of being located between Diefenbaker and Centennial Drives on the city limits, Monck Avenue earned a notoriety for speeding and late night drag racing in the 2000s prior to the installation of speed bumps in 2007.

Monck Avenue was replaced by both Childers Crescent on the south end and Diefenbaker Terrace on the north end, when the first phase of Kensington was developed in 2013, with the Devonshire Crescent leg closed off and rerouted to a back lane leading to Diefenbaker Drive, as a way to compensate for the loss of Monck.

To date, it is unknown whether or not the City of Saskatoon plans to reuse the Monck name on any future street developments.

== Area Parks ==
- Pacific Park 19.10 acres (77,300 m^{2})
- Pacific Park 5.47 acres (22,100 m^{2})
- Atlantic Park 10.07 acres (40,800 m^{2})

== Government and politics ==
Pacific Heights exists within the federal electoral district of Saskatoon West. It is currently represented by Brad Redekopp of the Conservative Party of Canada, first elected in 2015.

Provincially, the area is within the constituency of Saskatoon Fairview. It is currently represented by Vicki Mowat of the Saskatchewan New Democratic Party, first elected in a 2017 by-election.

In Saskatoon's non-partisan municipal politics, Pacific Heights lies within ward 3. It is currently represented by Ann Iwanchuk, first elected in 2011.

== Education ==
Lester B. Pearson School
- 3620 Centennial Drive; Saskatoon, Saskatchewan, S7L 5L2; Canada

Information
- Type: Elementary
- School board: Saskatoon Public School Division
- Principal: Shane Bradley
- Enrollment: 245 (2017)
- Education system: Public
- Language: English
- Feeder to: Tommy Douglas Collegiate
- Website: Lester B. Pearson School

Father Vachon School
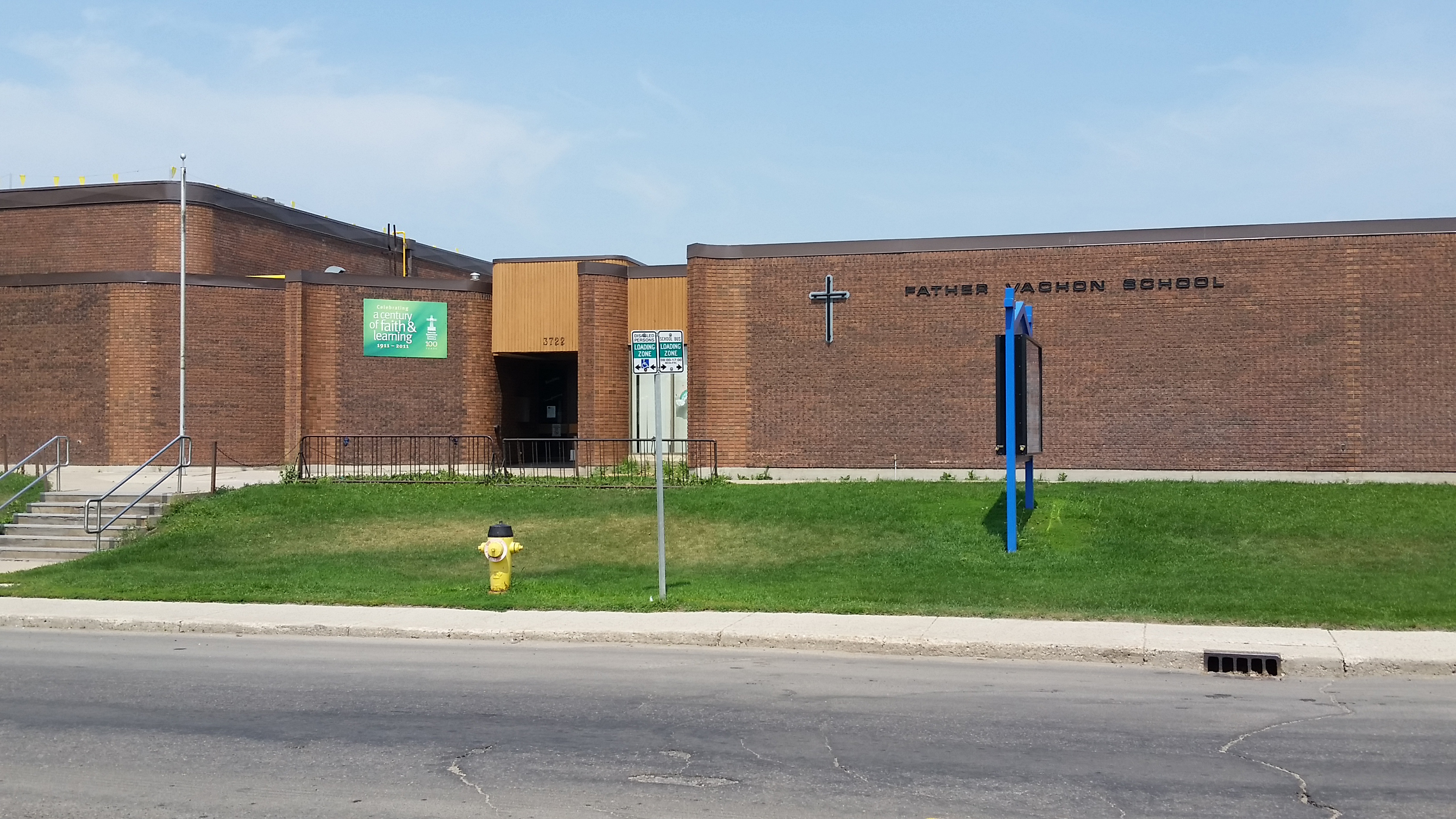
- 3722 Centennial Drive; Saskatoon, Saskatchewan, S7L 5K4; Canada

Information
- Type: Elementary/Middle
- Religious affiliation: Catholic
- Opened: 1976
- School board: Greater Saskatoon Catholic Schools
- Principal: Rebecca Pion
- Grades: Pre-Kindergarten to Grade 8
- Enrollment: 311 (2017)
- Education system: Separate
- Language: English
- Feeder to: Bethlehem High School
- Website: Father Vachon School

- Lester B. Pearson Public Elementary School
- Father Vachon Catholic K-8 School

Both Lester B. Pearson School and Father Vachon School are nestled side by each along Centennial Drive with their northern school yards extend out into Pacific Park.

== Shopping ==
Pacific Heights is served by the amenities provided next door at Confederation Urban Centre especially 22nd Street Arterial Commercial District which is just across Diefenbaker Drive. Community residents will also soon enjoy those proffered by Blairmore Urban Centre which is under construction.

== Transportation ==
Highway 14 extends out westward from 22nd Street West and is being revamped for the new neighbourhood construction west of the old City limits. Blairmore SDA will soon define the new western city limits. Asquith and, Biggar will soon be the new bedroom communities as Saskatoon expands.

=== City Transit ===
Pacific Heights is serviced by the City Transit Bus Route Saskatoon Transit. Route 60: Confederation & Route 65: Kensington.

== Life ==
Pacific Heights community Association, established November 1978, puts on elementary school fun nights, and is responsible for assembling together a number of sports, recreational and fitness programs for the areas various age groups. The association also maintains their own website at Pacific Heights Community Association

== History ==
The roadways are mainly named after prominent politicians and fathers of confederation.

List of Streets in Pacific Heights
Street Name	Politician
Centennial Drive	Named in honour of the Canadian centennial in 1967
Cockburn Crescent	James Cockburn; Father of confederation
Devonshire Crescent, Way	Duke of Devonshire Governor General of Canada
Diefenbaker Drive	John G. Diefenbaker; Former Prime Minister of Canada
Dickey Crescent	Robert B. Dickey; Father of confederation
Haviland Crescent	Thomas Heath Haviland; Father of confederation
Johnson Crescent	John Mercer Johnson; Father of confederation
Langevin Crescent	Sir Hector-Louis Langevin; Father of confederation
Lisgar Avenue	John Young, 1st Baron Lisgar; second Governor General of Canada
Lloyd Crescent	Woodrow Stanley Lloyd; Former premier of Saskatchewan
McDougall Crescent	William McDougall; Father of confederation
Michener Crescent, Way, Court, Place.	Roland Michener Governor General of Canada 1967–1974
Monck Avenue (former street)	Charles Stanley Monck, 4th Viscount Monck (1819–1894), Governor General of Canada
Mowat Crescent	Oliver Mowat; Father of confederation
Patterson Crescent	William Paterson; Former premier of Saskatchewan
Pope Crescent	James Colledge Pope; Father of confederation
Tache Crescent	Étienne-Paschal Taché; Father of confederation
Vanier Crescent, Way	Georges Vanier; 19th Governor General of Canada
