= Confederation Park, Saskatoon =

Confederation Park
- Neighbourhood
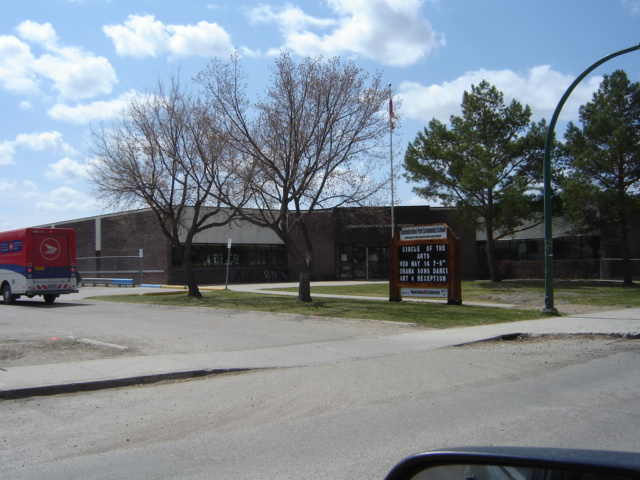
- wâhkôhtowin (formerly Confederation Park) School
- Interactive map of Confederation Park
- Coordinates: 52°8′25″N 106°44′23″W
- Country: Canada
- Province: Saskatchewan
- City: Saskatoon
- Suburban Development Area: Confederation SDA
- Neighbourhood: Confederation Park

Government
  - Type: Municipal (Ward 3)
  - Administrative body: Saskatoon City Council
  - Councillor: David Kirton

Area
  - Total: 1.54 km^{2} (0.59 sq mi)

Population (2019)
  - Total: 7,347
  - Density: 4,770/km^{2} (12,400/sq mi)
- Time zone: UTC−6 (CST)

The Confederation Park subdivision of Saskatoon, Saskatchewan, Canada, is located west of the South Saskatchewan River, Saskatoon's west side.

== History ==
The community first appeared on city maps in the late 1960s, with development commencing in the early 1970s. Most street names in the community are those of prominent politicians in Canadian history, primarily prime ministers, though others, including governors-general have also been recognized. Full build-out of the neighbourhood did not occur until the mid-2000s with the construction of one final street, Blakeney Crescent, honoring former Saskatchewan premier Allan Blakeney. In 2012, a small extension to the community was indicated as part of the area concept plan for the neighboring new area of Kensington, involving a short extension of Steeves Avenue to connect with a realigned 33rd Street. This will presumably facilitate the construction of a small number of additional dwellings.

In December 2023, John A. Macdonald Road was renamed miyo-wâhkôhtowin Road. The word is a translation of “good relationship” in the Cree language.

== Geography ==
The suburb is fashioned around Parc Canada, a 40.5-acre (164,000 m^{2}) park area comprising Bishop Roberecki School and Confederation Park School. The northern boundary is 33rd Street West and the eastern is Confederation Drive. The southern boundary is Laurier & Diefenbaker Drives. To the west of Confederation Park is Kensington.

== Demographics ==
In 2006, the neighbourhood consisted of 6,324 residents with an average family income of $50,210. At this time, the average household was valued at $143,142, and 72.7% of the population owned their own home. The average household size was 2.9. In 2019, Confederation Park was home to 7,347 people, with an average personal income of $36,210. At this time, 71.9% of the population owned their own home. The average household size was 3.

According to the City of Saskatoon Planning and Development, the average sale price of a home as of 2021 was $236,616.

== Government and politics ==
Confederation Park exists within the federal electoral district of Saskatoon West. It is currently represented by Brad Redekopp of the Conservative Party of Canada, first elected in 2019.

Provincially, the area is within the constituency of Saskatoon Fairview. It is currently represented by Vicki Mowat of the Saskatchewan New Democratic Party, first elected in a 2017 by-election.

In Saskatoon's non-partisan municipal politics, Confederation Park lies within ward 3. It is currently represented by Ann Iwanchuk, first elected in 2011.

== Education ==
Bishop Roborecki School
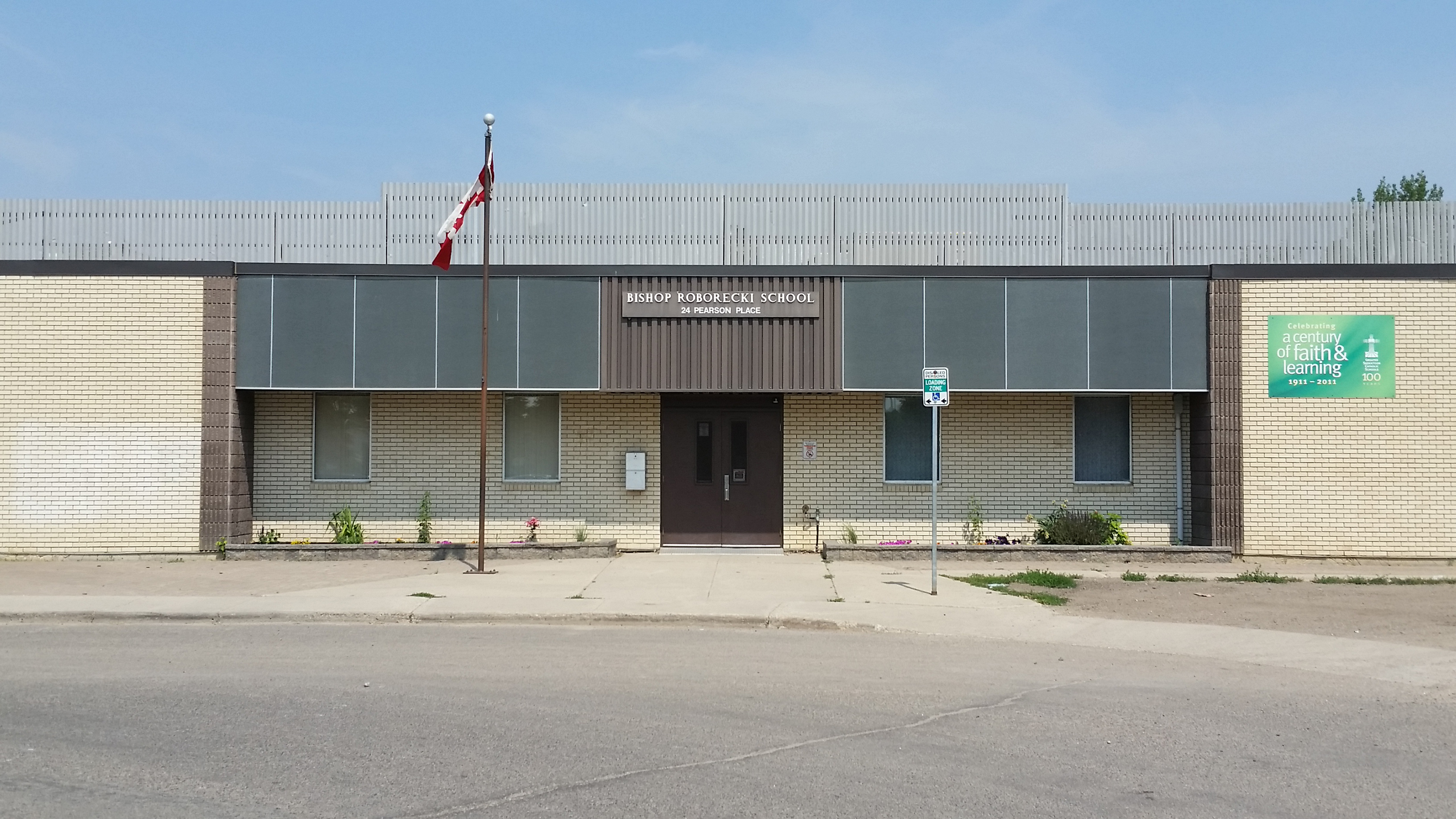
- 24 Pearson Place; Saskatoon, Saskatchewan, S7L 4S7; Canada

Information
- Type: Elementary
- Religious affiliation: Catholic
- Opened: 1974
- School board: Greater Saskatoon Catholic Schools
- Principal: Carol Sarich
- Grades: Pre-Kindergarten to Grade 8
- Enrollment: 352 (2017)
- Education system: Separate
- Language: English
- Feeder to: Bethlehem High School
- Website: Bishop Roborecki School

wâhkôhtowin School
- 3555 miyo-wâhkôhtowin Road; Saskatoon, Saskatchewan, S7L 4R9; Canada

Information
- Type: Elementary
- School board: Saskatoon Public School Division
- Principal: Pete Chief
- Grades: Kindergarten to Grade 8
- Enrollment: 486 (2017)
- Education system: Public
- Language: English, Cree
- Feeder to: Tommy Douglas Collegiate
- Website: wâhkôhtowin School

- Bishop Roborecki School is a separate elementary school.
- wâhkôhtowin School is a public elementary school providing education for grade levels K to 8, approximately ages 5 to 13.

== Street names ==
With the exception of 33rd Street and miyo-wâhkôhtowin Road, the roadways are mainly named after prominent prime ministers, premiers, and fathers of confederation.

List of Streets in Confederation Park
Street Name	Politician
Bennett Place	R. B. Bennett; 11th prime minister of Canada
Bernard Crescent	Susan Agnes Bernard; wife of John A. Macdonald
Blakeney Crescent	Allan Blakeney; 10th premier of Saskatchewan
Borden Crescent, Place	Robert Borden; 8th prime minister of Canada
Byng Avenue	Julian Byng, 1st Viscount Byng of Vimy; 12th Governor General of Canada
Carter Crescent, Way	Frederick Carter; Father of confederation
Cartier Crescent	George-Étienne Cartier; Father of confederation
Chandler Place	Edward Barron Chandler; Father of confederation
Confederation Drive, Crescent, Place	Named in honour of the confederation in 1867
Diefenbaker Drive	John G. Diefenbaker; 13th prime minister of Canada
Dominion Crescent	Named in honour of the confederation in 1867
Douglas Crescent	Tommy Douglas; 7th premier of Saskatchewan
Fisher Crescent	Charles Fisher; Father of confederation
Galt Court	Alexander Tilloch Galt; Father of confederation
Laurier Drive	Wilfrid Laurier; 7th prime minister of Canada
McCully Crescent	Jonathan McCully; Father of confederation
McGee Crescent	D'Arcy McGee; Father of confederation
Meighen Crescent	Arthur Meighen; 9th prime minister of Canada
miyo-wâhkôhtowin Road	Cree word for good relationship; the name was changed from John A. Macdonald Road in December 2023
Palmer Place	Edward Palmer; Father of confederation
Pearson Place	Lester B. Pearson; 14th prime minister of Canada
Shea Crescent	Ambrose Shea; Father of confederation
Smallwood Crescent	Joey Smallwood; 1st premier of Newfoundland and Labrador
St. Laurent Crescent	Louis St. Laurent; 12th prime minister of Canada
Steeves Avenue	William Steeves; Father of confederation
Tilley Avenue	Samuel Leonard Tilley; Father of confederation
Tupper Crescent	Charles Tupper; 6th prime minister of Canada
Whelan Crescent, Lane, Way	Edward Whelan; Father of confederation
