= Kensington, Saskatoon =

Kensington
- Neighbourhood
- Interactive map of Kensington
- Coordinates: 52°8′25″N 106°45′13″W
- Country: Canada
- Province: Saskatchewan
- City: Saskatoon
- Suburban Development Area: Blairmore
- Neighbourhood: Kensington
- Construction: 2013—Ongoing

Government
  - Type: Municipal (Ward 3)
  - Administrative body: Saskatoon City Council
  - Councillor: Ann Iwanchuk

Area
  - Total: 1.61 km^{2} (0.62 sq mi)
  - Land: 2.07 km^{2} (0.80 sq mi)

Population
  - Total: 8,300 (est. upon buildout)
  - Average Income: $
- Time zone: UTC-6 (UTC)

Kensington is a neighbourhood located in west Saskatoon, Saskatchewan, Canada that began construction in 2013. Around 2028, Kensington will reach completion and have an estimated population of 8,300. Kensington will feature Saskatoon's first application of the fused grid street network.

== History ==
From 1968 to 2005, a local greenhouse used 120 acres (49 ha) of land in the area as its primary tree nursery. Remnants of shelterbelts remained prior to development. The land that includes Kensington was annexed between 2000 and 2005. The first concept drawings of Kensington (then unnamed) appeared in the Blairmore Sector Concept Plan in 2005. Saskatoon City Council approved the neighbourhood plan on April 16, 2012.

== Government and politics ==
Kensington exists within the federal electoral district of Saskatoon West. It is currently represented by Brad Redekopp of the Conservative Party of Canada, first elected in 2019.

Provincially, the area is within the constituency of Saskatoon Fairview. It is currently represented by Vicki Mowat of the New Democratic Party, first elected in a 2017 by-election.

In Saskatoon's non-partisan municipal politics, Kensington lies in ward 3. It is currently represented by Ann Iwanchuk, first elected in 2011.

== Institutions ==
=== Education ===
No plans exist yet for schools in Kensington proper. Bethlehem High School and Tommy Douglas Collegiate are located in the Blairmore Urban Centre immediately to the south. The nearest elementary schools are located in adjacent Confederation Park and Pacific Heights, though the city's public and separate school boards have yet to indicate where students residing in Kensington will be bused until such a time as schools are constructed in the community.

== Parks and recreation ==
As of 2022, construction had begun on Lions Century Park. The park is to be completed by 2023 and will include a skiing hill, spray park, ball diamond, and playground. There are four completed parks – Mahoney Park, Ed Jordan Park, Peter H Currie Park, and George H Clare Park.

== Commercial ==
The neighbourhood concept plan identifies two commercial zones: a mixed-use commercial/residential area on the edge of the community immediately north of 22nd Street, and smaller neighbourhood commercial further to the north; the former of which was under development as of 2016, with the city's first Save-On-Foods location opening in the summer of 2017. Additional commercial is shown on current (2017) city planning maps being zoned along Neault Road to the west. Kensington is located immediately adjacent and north of the commercial district within the Blairmore Suburban Centre which includes Wal-Mart and other big-box commercial stores.

== Institutional ==
The community plan for Kensington incorporates the former Yarrow Youth Farm, a correctional facility for at-risk youth, which was annexed into Saskatoon with the rest of the Blairmore region. In March 2012, the City of Saskatoon was in negotiations with the province to relocate the facility. The provincial government announced the closure of the facility in January 2015. By October 2015, the 40-acre site was for sale.

== Location ==
Kensington is located within the Blairmore Suburban Development Area. It is bounded by the west boundaries of the Confederation Park and Pacific Heights neighbourhoods to the east, Highway 14 to the south, and the remained of the Blairmore Development Area to the north and west. The proposed northern extension of Saskatchewan Highway 7 (currently Secondary Highway 684), also known as Neault Road) will form the western boundary and link to the western access point into Kensington (designated Kensington Gate). Access from the south will be via Kensington Boulevard (which will connect with 33rd Street in the north and Betts Avenue and the regional commercial hub in the south); access from the east will be provided via extensions of Diefenbaker Drive and Centennial Drive and 33rd Street West serves as a partial northern boundary for the neighbourhood; the street was realigned to make way for Kensington's development. Childers Crescent replaced Monck Avenue as the neighborhood's eastern boundary.
