= 22nd Street (Saskatoon) =

Street in Saskatoon, Saskatchewan

- Part of: Highway 7 / Highway 14
- Maintained by: City of Saskatoon
- Length: 7.4 km (4.6 mi)
- Location: Saskatoon
- East end: Spadina Crescent
- Major junctions: Idylwyld Drive; Circle Drive
- West end: Saskatoon City Limits; continues as Highway 14

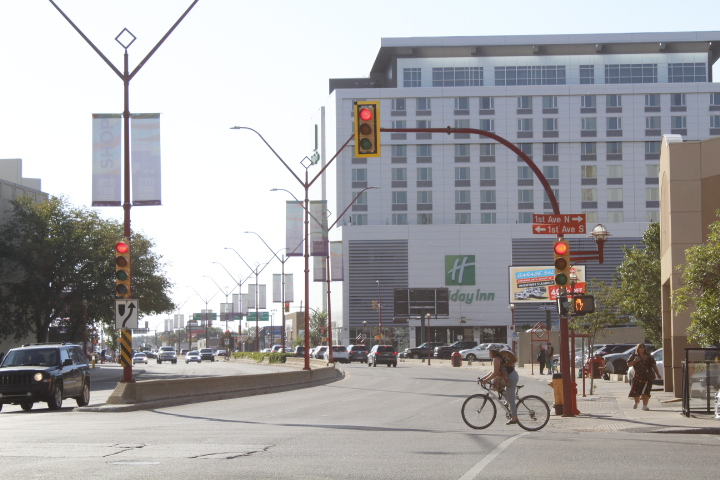
22nd Street downtown

22nd Street is an arterial road in Saskatoon, Saskatchewan. It begins as 22nd Street East in the Central Business District. Going west it passes the Midtown Plaza and TCU Place. At the intersection with Idylwyld Drive, it becomes 22nd Street West; the intersection also serves as the eastern terminus for both Highway 7 and Highway 14. Through the inner city neighbourhoods of Caswell Hill, Riversdale, Westmount, and Pleasant Hill, it contains a mixture of commercial and residential development. It then connects with Circle Drive via an interchange. Next to the interchange is the Confederation Mall. Across from that is a Real Canadian Superstore. From there is passes by the neighbourhoods of Pacific Heights, Blairmore, and Kensington. The road then heads out of the city and continues on as Highway 14.

Prior to 2005, 22nd Street used to turn southwest near the present-day Hart Road intersection and continue as Highway 7, while traffic had to leave the roadway to follow Highway 14. The roadway was removed to make way Blairmore Urban Centre, with 22nd Street transitioning directly to Highway 14, while Highway 7 temporarily followed Betts Avenue from 2005 to 2012 and then was moved to its permanent realignment via Nault Road.

== 22nd Street West ==
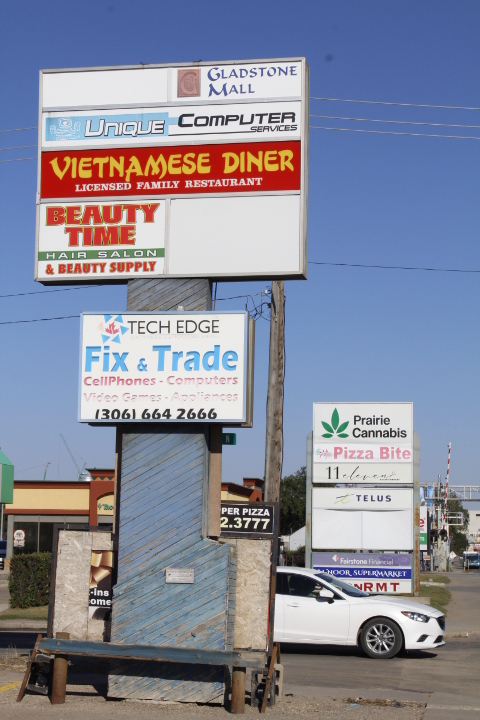
One of the strip malls lining 22nd Street West.

For a portion of residential neighbourhoods known as "the Avenues," which stretches from Avenue A to Avenue Y, 22nd Street West serves as the dividing line between north and south. It serves as a major commercial street for the Meadowgreen, Mount Royal, Pleasant Hill, Westmount, Riversdale, and Caswell Hill neighbourhoods. It also encompasses Asimakaniseekan Askiy 102B, an urban Indian reserve. It is home to many commercial businesses within these neighbourhoods, including restaurants, fast food, liquor stores, pharmacies, pawn shops, mechanic offices, churches, apartments, beauty salons, computer repair stores, a hardware supply store, an amusement arcade, and a Super 8 motel.

A strip mall called Westgate Plaza exists on 22nd Street West between Avenue W North and Witney Avenue, which contains a medical clinic, some restaurants, a Scotiabank location, as well as a Shoppers Drug Mart location. Another strip mall called Gladstone Mall intersects 22nd Street West and Avenue G North, which includes multiple fast food restaurants and local stores. Intersecting 22nd Street West and Avenue J South is Gabriel Dumont Institute, a post-secondary institution.

Entering Blairmore Urban Centre, the street contains the Shaw Centre, Saskatoon's largest leisure centre. It also contains both Tommy Douglas Collegiate and Bethlehem Catholic High School.

Bus access on 22nd Street West is provided by Saskatoon Transit. The routes include 60 - Confederation, 61 - Blairmore, and 65 - Kensington.

== Major intersections ==
From east to west. The entire route is in Saskatoon.

km	mi	Destinations	Notes
0.0	0.0	Spadina Crescent	
0.4	0.25	3rd Avenue	
0.6	0.37	1st Avenue	
0.9	0.56	Idylwyld Drive (Highway 11) to Highway 16 / Highway 5 – Prince Albert, Regina, Battlefords, Yorkton Highway 7 / Highway 14 begins	Highway 7 / Highway 14 eastern terminus
1.7	1.1	Avenue H	
2.5	1.6	Avenue P	To St. Paul's Hospital
3.3	2.1	Avenue W	
4.2– 4.4	2.6– 2.7	Circle Drive (Highway 11 / Highway 16) / Confederation Drive / Fairlight Drive	Circle Drive interchange; at-grade access to Confederation Drive / Fairlight Drive
4.9	3.0	Diefenbaker Drive	
5.6	3.5	Hart Road	Seagull intersection
7.0	4.3	Betts Avenue / Kensington Boulevard	
7.3– 7.4	4.5– 4.6	Highway 7 west / Nault Road (Highway 684 north) – Rosetown, Dalmeny	Split intersection; west end of Highway 7 concurrency
7.3– 7.4	4.5– 4.6	Highway 14 west – Biggar	Continues west
1.000 mi = 1.609 km; 1.000 km = 0.621 mi: Concurrency terminus
