= Montgomery School =

Montgomery School may refer to the following educational establishments:

- Montgomery School at Montgomery Place, Saskatoon, Canada
- Montgomery School, Hohne, a Service Children's Education school in Germany
