= Bethlehem Catholic High School (Saskatoon) =

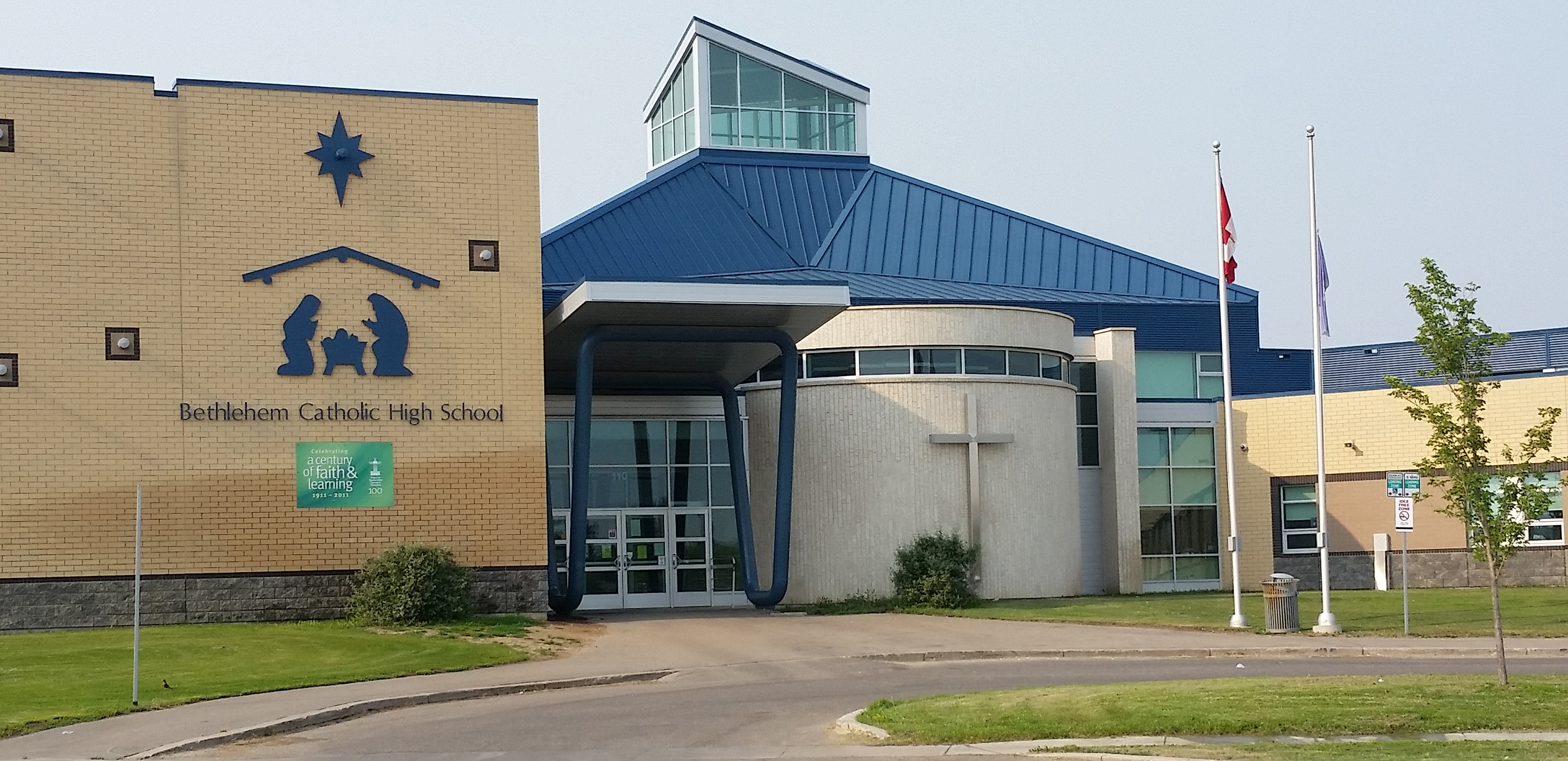

Location
- 110 Bowlt Crescent; Saskatoon, Saskatchewan, S7M 0L1; Canada; 52.128444°N 106.744189°W

Information
- Type: Secondary
- Motto: Be Courageous. Be Committed. Be United. On Earth As It Is In Heaven
- Religious affiliation: Catholic
- Opened: 2007
- School board: Greater Saskatoon Catholic Schools
- Principal: Shelda Hanlan-Stroh
- Grades: Grade 9 to Grade 12
- Enrollment: 1,439 (2025)
- Education system: Separate
- Language: English, French Immersion, Ukrainian Bilingual
- Colours: Navy, Gold and White
- Team name: Bethlehem Stars
- Website: Bethlehem Catholic High School

Bethlehem Catholic High School is a separate (Catholic) high school in Saskatoon, Saskatchewan, Canada, that opened in August 2007. It is located off 22nd Street West in the Blairmore Urban Centre neighbourhood.

Bethlehem serves students living on the west side of Circle Drive. This school integrates faith and learning in a facility featuring a chapel, two gymnasiums and a theatre. It is physically connected to the public high school Tommy Douglas Collegiate through the adjacent Shaw Centre recreation facility.

Bethlehem was named after the birthplace of Jesus Christ, the foundation of the Christian religion.

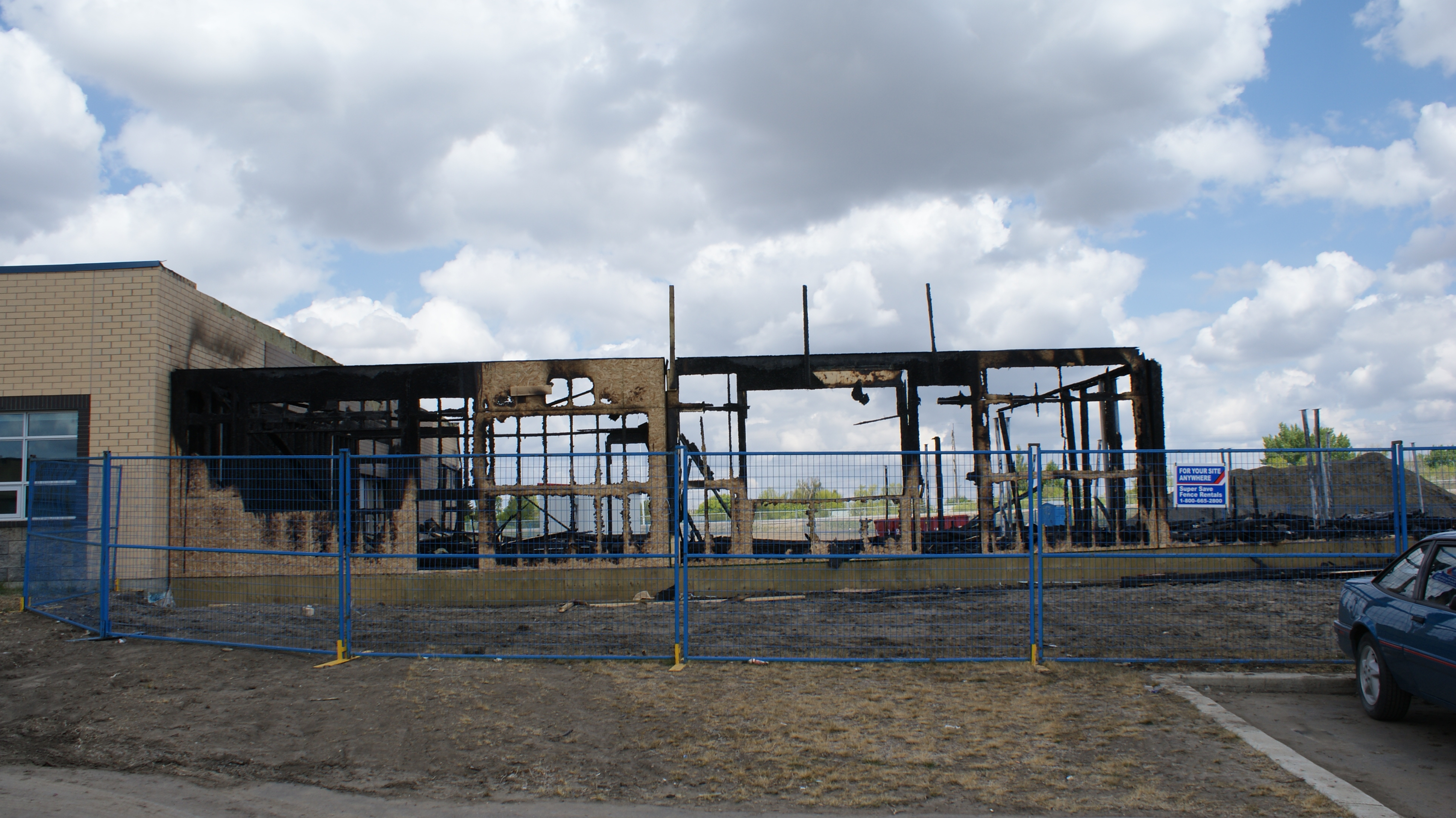
Bethlehem High School Addition fire

On June 7, 2009, a fire destroyed an addition containing portable classrooms still under construction. Damage was estimated at $750,000. The fire caused only minor damage to the existing building. The cause of the fire was determined to be arson.

In 2011, work began on four classrooms to be added to the existing portables.

Currently its feeder schools are Bishop Klein School, Bishop Roborecki School, Father Vachon School, St. Dominic School, St. Gerard, St. Marguerite School, St. Lorenzo Ruiz Catholic School, St. Mark School and St. Peter School.

== Recreation ==
Aside from in-house facilities, Bethlehem school is connected to the Shaw Centre recreation complex, which opened in 2009 with a 50-metre swimming pool.

== Gallery ==
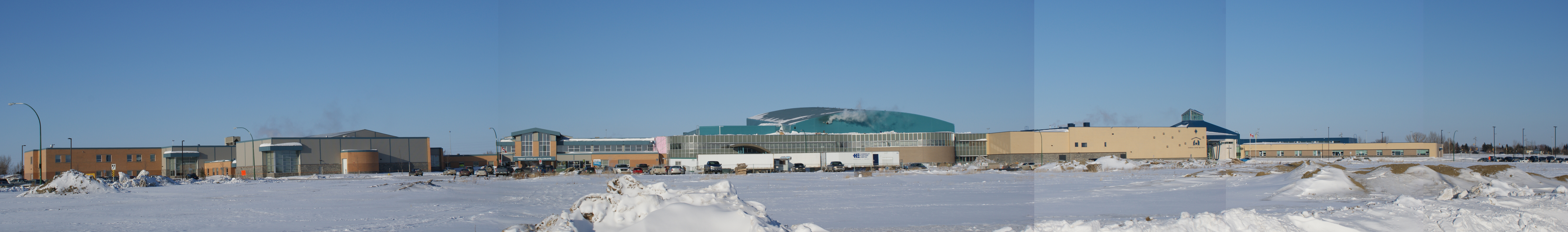
