= Blairmore Urban Centre, Saskatoon =

Coordinates: 52°7′36″N 106°45′11″W

Blairmore Urban Centre
- Neighbourhood
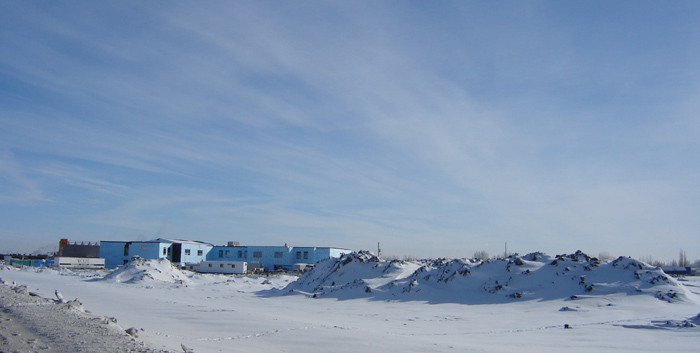
- Construction in the Blairmore Urban Centre
- Interactive map of Blairmore Urban Centre
- Country: Canada
- Province: Saskatchewan
- City: Saskatoon
- Sector: Blairmore

Government
  - Type: Municipal (Ward 3)
  - Administrative body: Saskatoon City Council
  - Councillor: Ann Iwanchuk

Blairmore Urban Centre, previously named Blairmore Suburban Centre, is a community service/commercial/residential community currently under development in western Saskatoon, Saskatchewan. It is part of the city's Blairmore Sector, a large region annexed from the Rural Municipality of Corman Park No. 344 in 2005. Ultimately, the sector will consist of seven new neighbourhoods, plus the Blairmore Urban Centre, which is the first component of the sector to be developed.

The urban centre lies south of 22nd Street West, which is also Saskatchewan Highway 14. Saskatchewan Highway 7 forms the area's western boundary as it links to the site of a proposed interchange at 22nd Street; prior to 2012, however, the highway was temporarily aligned with Betts Avenue within the urban centre until a new roadway was later constructed. The community also dovetails with the final phase of construction of the adjacent Parkridge community to the south. At present, the urban centre consists of two high schools Tommy Douglas Collegiate and Bethlehem High School, plus a recreation/civic centre named Shaw Centre which opened the fall of 2008.; the three facilities are unique in Saskatoon as they are the first to be physically connected as one large building, allowing sharing of recreation amenities.

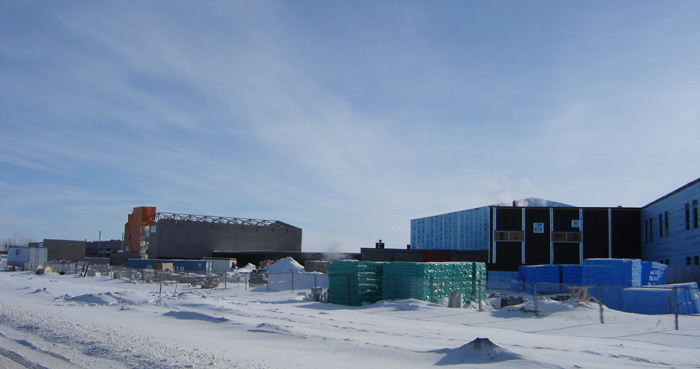
Construction in the Blairmore Urban Centre

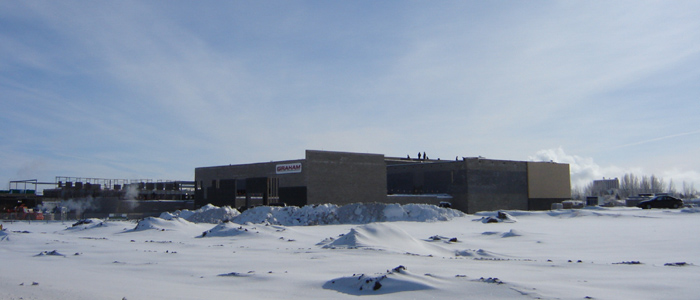
Construction in the Blairmore Urban Centre

== Recreation facilities ==
- Shaw Centre (formerly known as Blairmore Civic Centre) on Bowlt Crescent opened in the fall of 2009 and includes a track and 10, 7.5, 5, & 3 metre platform and springboard diving with 10 lane 50 metre competitive high performance swimming pool and 6 lane warm up pool It is physically connected to the area's two high schools.

== Shopping ==
- A major big-box development is located west of Betts Avenue and south of 22nd Street, featuring a Wal-Mart and other retailers including Sally Beauty Supply, Bulk Barn, Jump.ca, Subway, Pennington's, Reitman, Sleep Country, and the Royal Bank.
- Additional strip-mall and hotel development exists east of Betts Avenue, as well. The hotels being built includes some of the first new accommodations to be constructed on the west side of the city in decades.
- Approximately 315,000 square feet (29,300 m^{2}) of retail is expected to be ultimately constructed in Blairmore Sector It is not known how much of this is earmarked for the urban centre itself.
- The urban centre is located a few kilometres west of the main 22nd Street commercial hub at Circle Drive.
- Hotels: Best Western Plus
- Additional retail is located off 22nd Street in adjacent Kensington.
- There is a Boston Pizza, Dollarama, Staples, Montana's, and Wok Box

== Government and politics ==
Blairmore Urban Centre exists within the federal electoral district of Saskatoon West. It is currently represented by Brad Redekopp of the Conservative Party of Canada, first elected in 2019.

Provincially, the area is within the constituency of Martensville-Blairmore. Prior to the 2024 Saskatchewan general election, the area was in the riding of Saskatoon Fairview.

In Saskatoon's non-partisan municipal politics, Blairmore Urban Centre lies within ward 3. It is currently represented by Ann Iwanchuk, first elected in 2011.

== Education ==
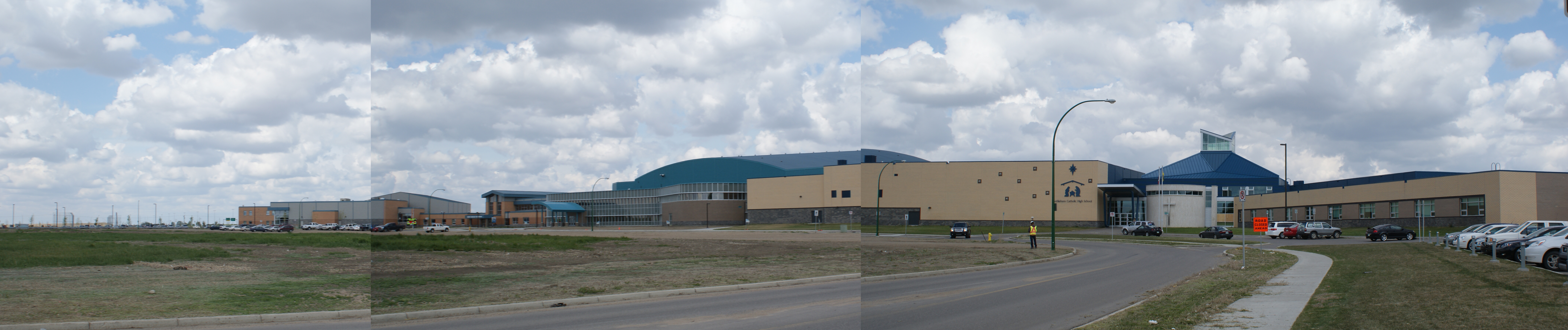
The area's two high schools are connected together by way of the Shaw Centre recreation complex.

- Tommy Douglas Collegiate, public secondary school opened in the fall of 2007
- Bethlehem Catholic High School, Catholic/separate secondary school, opened in the fall of 2007.

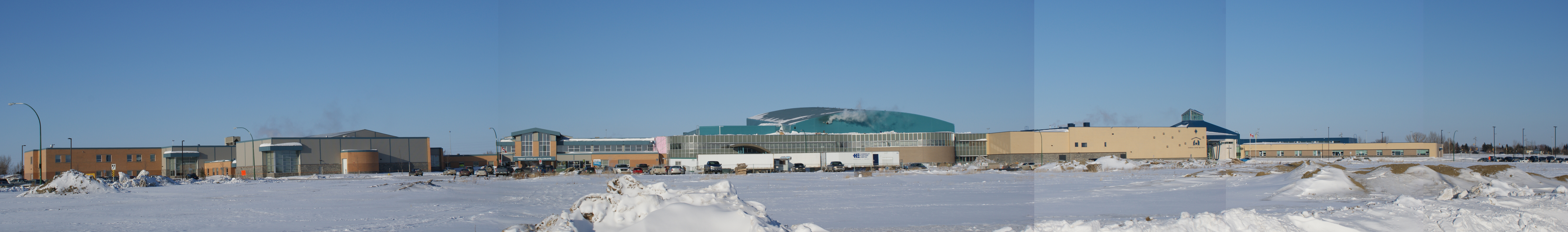

== Transportation ==
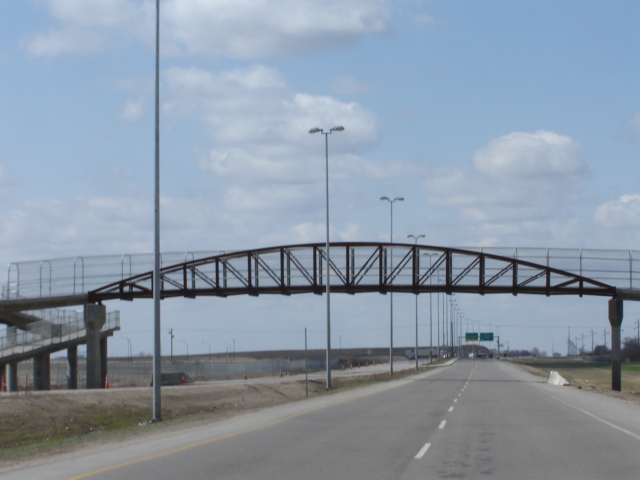
Pedestrian overpass over 22nd Street

22nd Street (Highway 14) is a major thoroughfare through Saskatoon Highway 14 connects with Asquith, Biggar Wilkie, Unity, and Macklin en route to Alberta.

Much of the SC is being constructed on the former alignment of Highway 7; the highway wsd temporarily rerouted along Betts Avenue to Hwy 14/22nd Street. A permanent realignment, farther to the west, was put in place in 2012, with an interchange planned at the junction of Hwys 7 and 14.

=== City Transit ===
Public Transit to the area began on August 31, 2008. Route 23 to Hampton Place runs Monday to Friday at a 30-minute frequency during peak hours, and a 60-minute frequency during midday hours. There is no evening or weekend service.
