= Confederation Urban Centre, Saskatoon =

Confederation Urban Centre
- Neighborhood
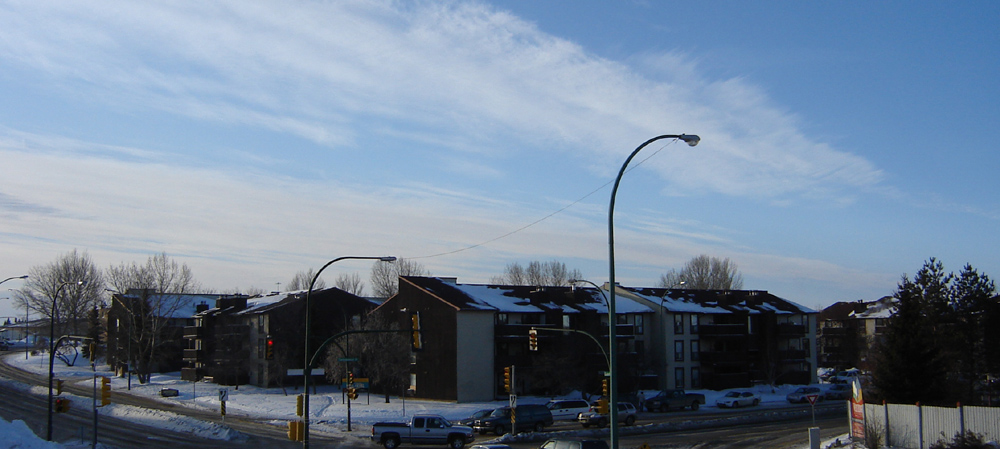
- Housing complex in Confederation Urban Centre
- Interactive map of Confederation Urban Centre
- Coordinates: 52°7′57″N 106°43′17″W
- Country: Canada
- Province: Saskatchewan
- City: Saskatoon
- Sector: Confederation

Government
  - Type: Municipal (Ward 3)
  - Administrative body: Saskatoon City Council
  - Councillor: David Kirton

Population (2005)
  - Total: 580
  - Average Income: $22,873

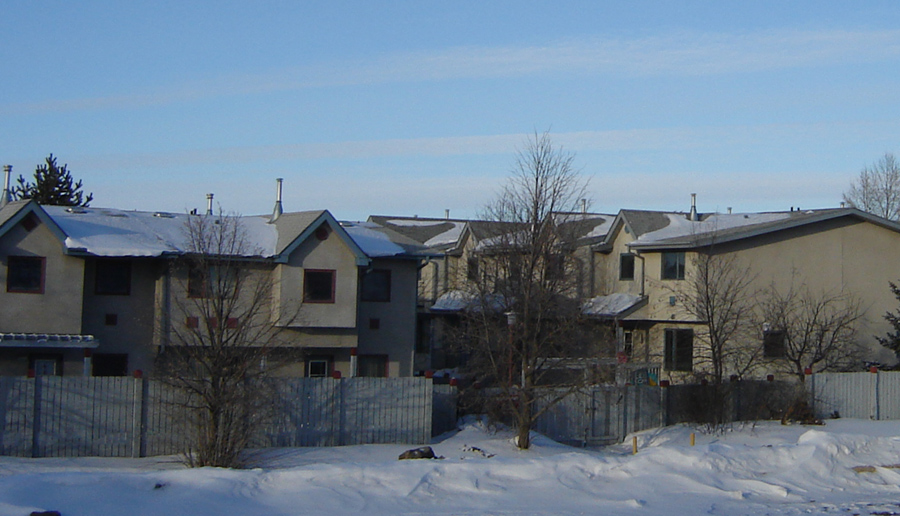
Townhouse Complex in Confederation Urban Centre

Confederation Urban Centre, previously known as Confederation Suburban Centre, is a community in the city of Saskatoon, Saskatchewan, which consists primarily of commercial development.

== Scope ==
Confederation Urban Centre contains Confederation Park Mall, Cosmo Civic Centre, Plaza 22, Carlyle King Library, Fairhaven Bowl and The Real Canadian Superstore. Confederation Urban Centre has a straight northern boundary that does not follow any roadway but follows along the edge of the Massey Place Neighborhood around and about Milton Street and a southernmost tip at 11th Street East. It has an eastern boundary along Circle Drive.

The western boundary is Diefenbaker Drive between 22nd Street and extends north from here to about Milton Street. The western boundary on the southern portion of 22nd Street encompasses Confederation Inn, and all retail sectors which are east of Fairmount Drive, and north of Fairlight Drive. The western boundary continues along the course of Circle Drive until 11th Street taking in the SGI complex, the Jehovah Witness Hall and the Baseball Diamonds and some of W.A. Reid Park.

== History ==
Planning for a suburban centre near the intersection of what was then 22nd Street and Dundonald Avenue (Dundonald later became Circle Drive) was underway by the spring of 1966. At that time, the area was to be called the Dundonald Suburban Centre, and would have been located east of Dundonald Avenue/Circle Drive, north of 22nd Street and south of 29th Street (an area now part of the Mount Royal residential community).

Most of the amenities were constructed between 1970 and 1990. The area was designated a Suburban Centre in the 1980s; prior to this the portion north of 22nd Street was considered part of the Confederation Park community and the area to the south part of Fairhaven.

== Layout ==
This area comprises mainly non residential development between the neighboring communities. It makes use of land area on the west side of the major interchange between 22nd Street and Circle Drive.

== Government and politics ==
Confederation Urban Centre exists within the federal electoral district of Saskatoon West. It is currently represented by Sheri Benson of the New Democratic Party, first elected in 2015.

Provincially, the area is divided by Fairmont Court into two constituencies. The southern portion lies within the constituency of Saskatoon Riversdale. It is currently represented by Danielle Chartier of the Saskatchewan New Democratic Party (NDP), first elected in a 2009 by-election. The northern portion of the area lies within the constituency of Saskatoon Fairview. It is currently represented by Jennifer Campeau of the Saskatchewan Party, first elected in 2011.

In Saskatoon's non-partisan municipal politics, Confederation Urban Centre lies within ward 3. It is currently represented by Ann Iwanchuk, first elected in 2011.

== Shopping Malls ==
The Confederation Urban Centre contains 400 operating businesses which is 8% of Saskatoon's retail sector

=== 22nd Street Arterial Commercial District ===
This is a neighborhood of shopping amenities. Several strip malls complement the area and nestle around Canadian Tire, and The Real Canadian Superstore offering a wide variety of goods and services.

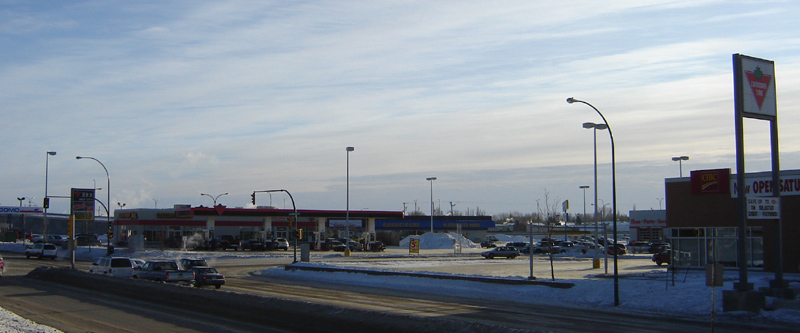
22nd Street Arterial Commercial District, Plaza 22 Strip Mall, Canadian Tire, Superstore, and Royal Square Strip Mall.

=== See also ===
List of shopping malls in Saskatoon

== Recreation ==
=== Cosmo Civic Centre ===
- Gymnasium
- Racquetball and Wallyball Court
- Fitness Room
- Meeting Rooms
- Theatre
- Combatives Room
- Carlyle King Branch Library

== Area Parks ==
- Charlottetown Parks
- W.A. Reid Park

== Transportation ==
22nd Street is a major thoroughfare through Saskatoon and carries both Highway 7 and Highway 14. Highway 7 connects with Vanscoy, Delisle, Rosetown, and Kindersely en route to Calgary, Alberta; while Highway 14 connects with Asquith, Biggar Wilkie, Unity, and Macklin en route to Alberta.

=== City Transit ===
Saskatoon Transit Bus Terminal Mall located on the north side of the Confederation Park Parking Lot along Laurier Drive.

- Route 2 Meadowgreen/City Centre
- Route 5 McCormack/City Center
- Route 7 Dundonald/City Centre
- Route 9 Montgomery/Riversdale/City Centre
- Route 10 Pleasant Hill/City Centre
- Route 22 Montgomery/City Centre/Hampton Village
- Route 60 Confederation/City Centre
- Route 61 Blairmore
- Route 63 Hampton Village
- Route 65 Kensington/City Center
