= Saskatoon Public Schools =

School division in Saskatoon, Canada

Saskatoon Public Schools (Saskatoon S.D. No. 13)

Location
- 310 21st St E, Saskatoon, SK S7K 1M7 Canada
- Coordinates: 52.126873°N 106.662188°W

District information
- Type: Public
- Motto: Inspiring Learning
- Grades: Pre-Kindergarten to Grade 12
- Schools: 58
- Budget: CA$318 million

Students and staff
- Students: 29,000 (2025)
- Staff: Approx. 3,300

Other information
- Director of Education: Charlene Scrimshaw
- Board of Directors Chairperson: Kim Stranden
- Teachers' Union: Saskatchewan Teachers' Federation
- Website: Saskatoon Public Schools

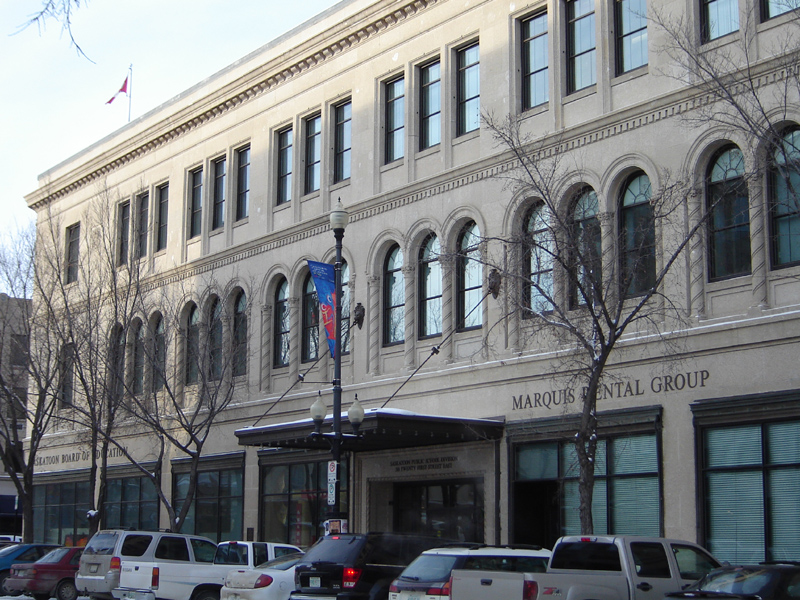
The SPS central office is located in the building that formerly housed Eaton’s as well as Army & Navy.

Saskatoon Public Schools (SPS) or Saskatoon S.D. No. 13 is the largest school division in Saskatchewan serving approximately 29,000 students with the support of more than 3,300 dedicated professional and support staff. Saskatoon Public Schools includes 48 elementary schools and 10 secondary schools in Saskatoon, including a flexible learning program for artists and athletes, and a unique partnership school — Charles Red Hawk Elementary School located on the Whitecap Dakota Nation.

SPS is overseen by a Board of Trustees. The Saskatoon Public Schools Board is responsible for shaping the overall educational vision for its schools and for developing and upholding policies that guide the division. The board's administrative office is located in the historic Eaton's Building at 310 21st St E in downtown Saskatoon.

Saskatoon Public Schools are multicultural and multi-faith. SPS has been recognized as a leader in literacy as well as for its unique program offerings. Some of these unique programs include:

- French Immersion
- Montessori
- Nêhiyâwiwin Cree Language and Culture
- Métis/Michif Cultural Program
- English as an Additional Language
- Nature-Based Learning
- Flexible/Blended Learning
- Intergenerational Classroom
- Saskatoon Academically Gifted Education (SAGE)
- Creative Action (Arts)
- Ecoquest (Ecological Outdoor Adventure)
- Let's Lead - Nīkānētān (Experiential Learning)
- ScienceTrek (Field-Based Science)

== Elementary schools ==
Saskatoon Public Schools is home to the following elementary schools:

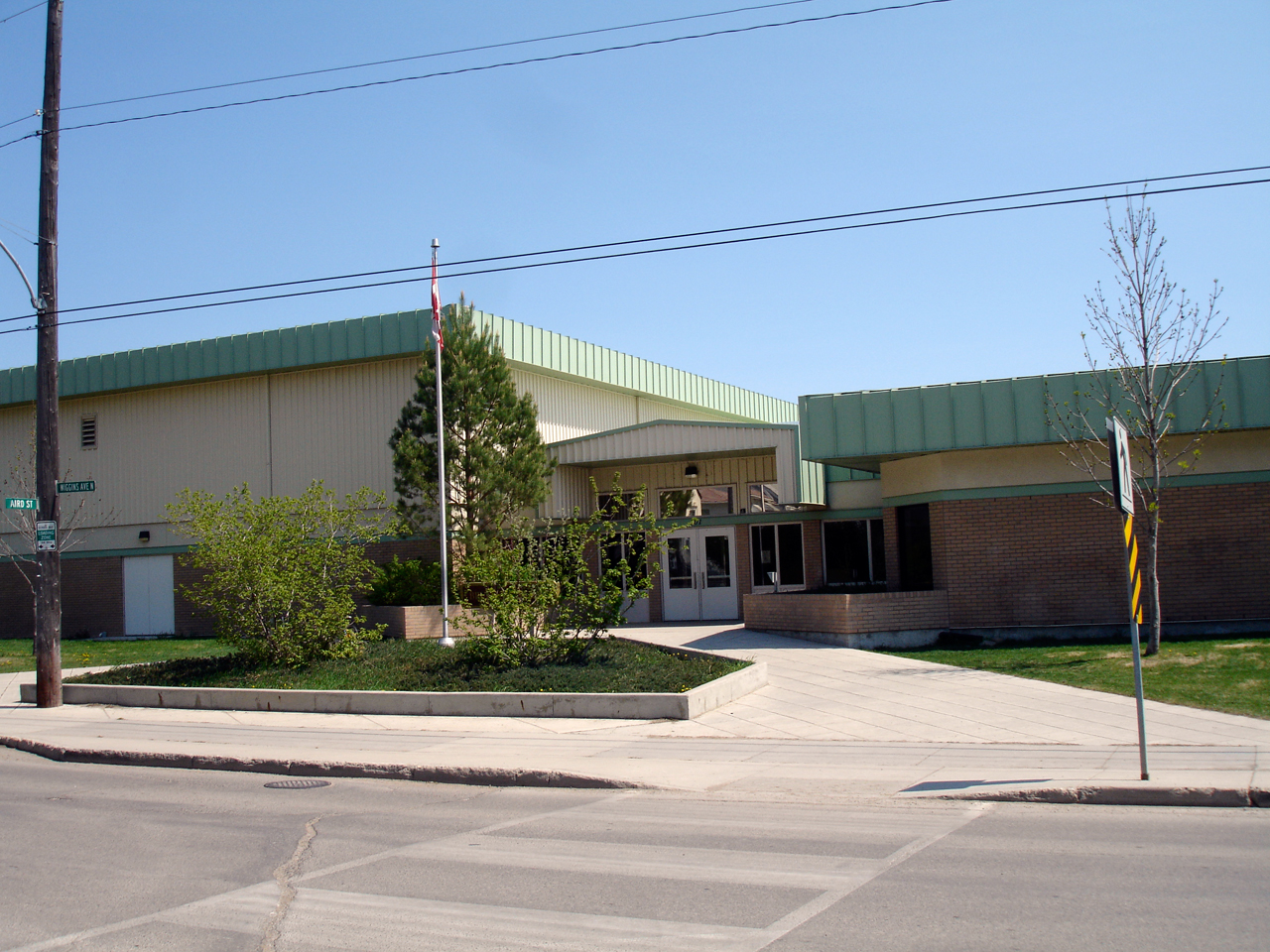
Brunskill School

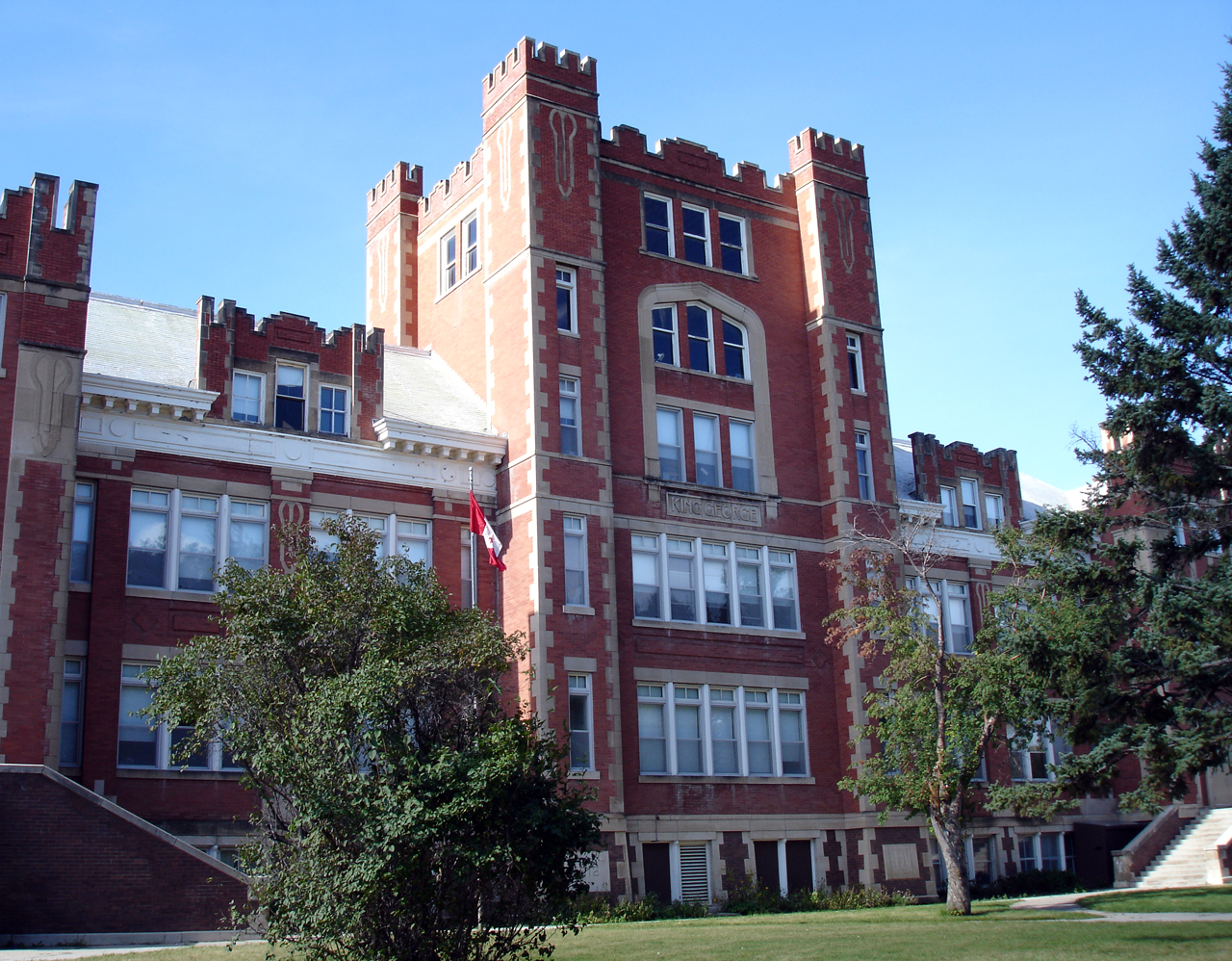
King George School

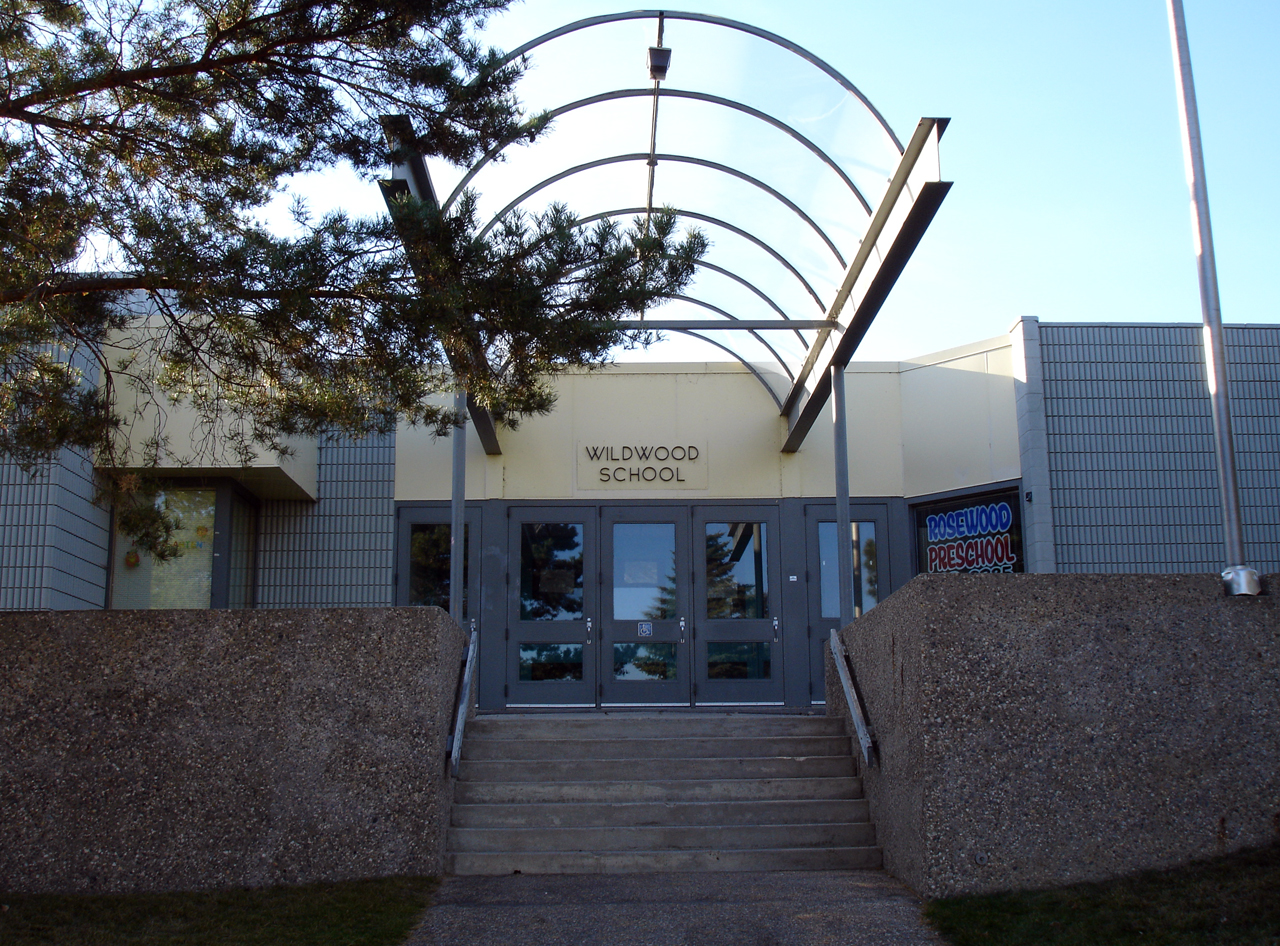
Wildwood School

- École Alvin Buckwold School
- Brevoort Park School
- Brownell School
- Brunskill School
- Buena Vista School
- Caroline Robins Community School
- Caswell Community School
- Chief Whitecap School
- City Park School
- Colette Bourgonje School
- École College Park School
- Dr. John G. Egnatoff School
- École Dundonald School
- Ernest Lindner School
- Fairhaven School
- École Forest Grove School
- Greystone Heights School
- École Henry Kelsey School
- Holliston School
- Howard Coad Community School
- Hugh Cairns V.C. School
- James L. Alexander School
- John Dolan School
- John Lake School
- King George Community School
- Lakeridge School
- École Lakeview School
- Lawson Heights School
- Lester B. Pearson School
- Mayfair Community School
- Montgomery School
- North Park Wilson School
- Prince Philip School
- Queen Elizabeth School
- École River Heights School
- Roland Michener School
- École Silverspring School
- Silverwood Heights School
- Sutherland Community School
- Sylvia Fedoruk School
- École Victoria School
- Vincent Massey Community School
- wâhkôhtowin Community School
- Westmount Community School
- Wildwood School
- Willowgrove School
- W.P. Bate Community School

== Secondary schools ==
Saskatoon Public Schools is home to the following secondary schools:

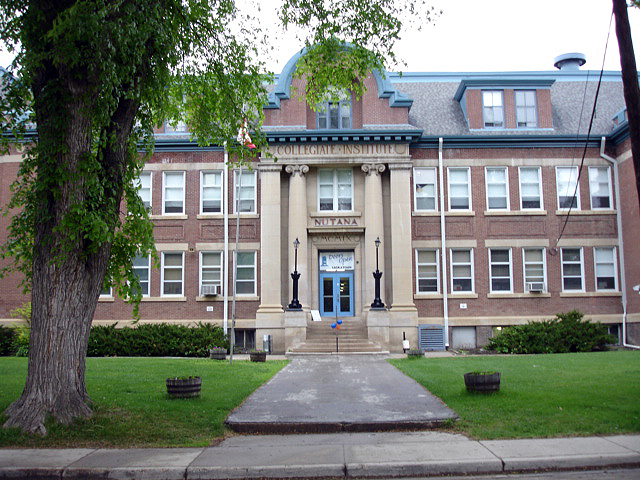
Nutana Collegiate (1910)

- Aden Bowman Collegiate
- Bedford Road Collegiate
- Centennial Collegiate
- Estey School (grades 6-12)
- Evan Hardy Collegiate
- Marion M. Graham Collegiate
- Mount Royal Collegiate
- Nutana Collegiate
- Tommy Douglas Collegiate
- Walter Murray Collegiate

== Alliance school ==
Saskatoon Public Schools is home to the following alliance school:

- Charles Red Hawk Elementary School] (Whitecap Dakota alliance school)
