= Tommy Douglas Collegiate =

Location
- 130 Bowlt Crescent; Saskatoon, Saskatchewan, S7M 0L1; Canada; 52.128476°N 106.747190°W

Information
- Type: Secondary
- Opened: 2007
- School board: Saskatoon Public Schools
- Principal: Tammy Chief
- Grades: 9 to 12
- Enrollment: 1,071 (September 2022)
- Education system: Public
- Language: English, French Immersion
- Colours: Navy and orange
- Mascot: Tiger
- Team name: Tigers
- Website: www.saskatoonpublicschools.ca/school/tommydouglas

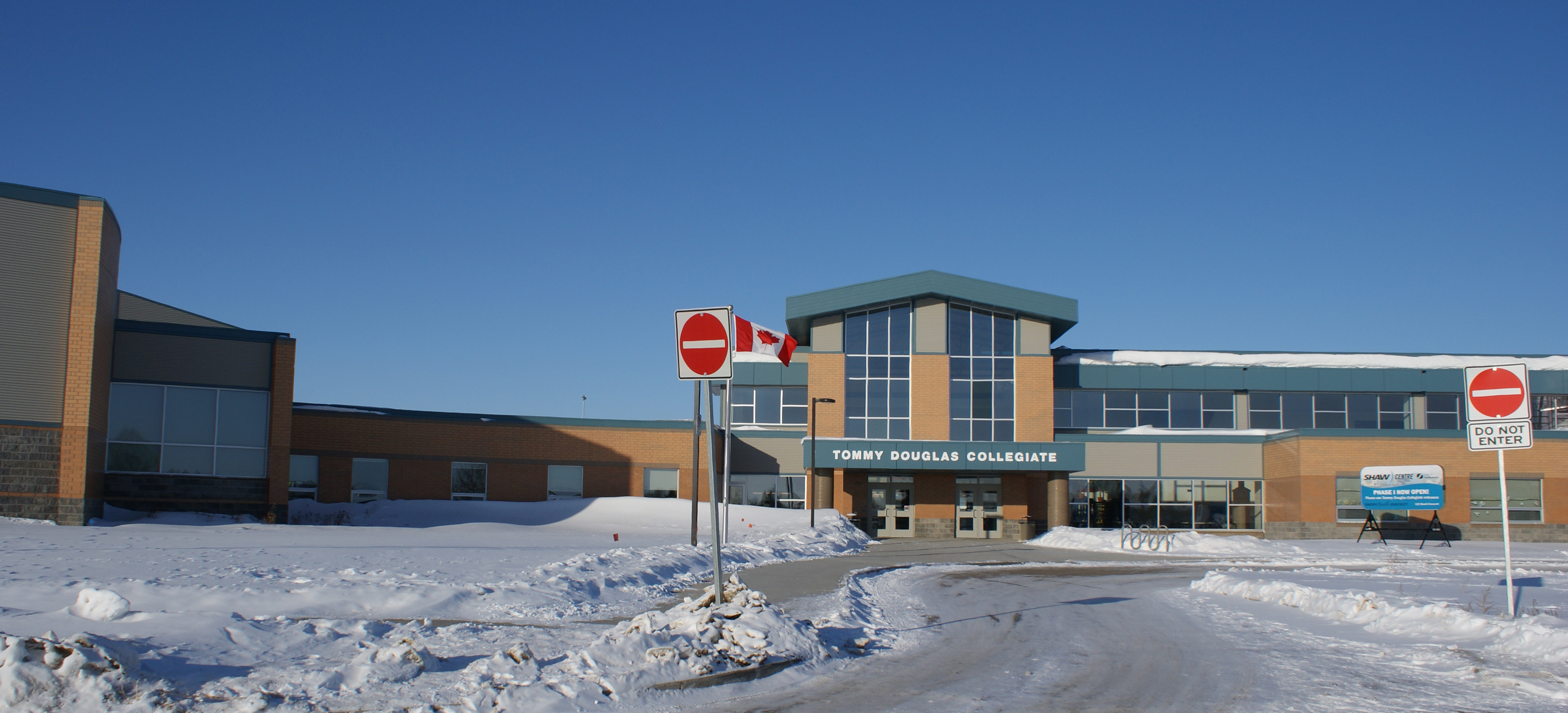

Tommy Douglas Collegiate Institute is a high school located in the Blairmore Urban Centre district of western Saskatoon, Saskatchewan, serving students from grades 9 through 12. It is named for Tommy Douglas, the "Father of Canadian Medicare," leader of the Saskatchewan Co-operative Commonwealth Federation and premier of Saskatchewan from 1944 to 1961. The school is unique among Saskatoon public schools in that it is the first to be physically connected to both a regional recreation complex (Shaw Centre) and to a Catholic/separate school (Bethlehem Catholic High School).

Its feeder schools are Dundonald School, Ernest Lindner School, Fairhaven School, James L. Alexander School, Lester B. Pearson School, Montgomery School, Wâhkôhtowin School and École Henry Kelsey.

== Recreation ==
A 50-metre swimming pool, fully equipped gym and various other facilities are available in both the school itself and the adjacent Shaw Centre.

== Sports ==
Sport	Grade	Season
Junior Football	9-10	Sept-Oct
Senior Football	11-12	
Frosh Volleyball	9	Sept-Oct
Junior Volleyball	9-10	Sept-Oct
Senior Volleyball	11-12	Sept-Nov
Frosh Basketball	9	
Junior Basketball	9-10	
Senior Basketball	9-12	
Wrestling	9-12	
Curling	9-12	
Badminton	9-12	
Track & Field	9-12	

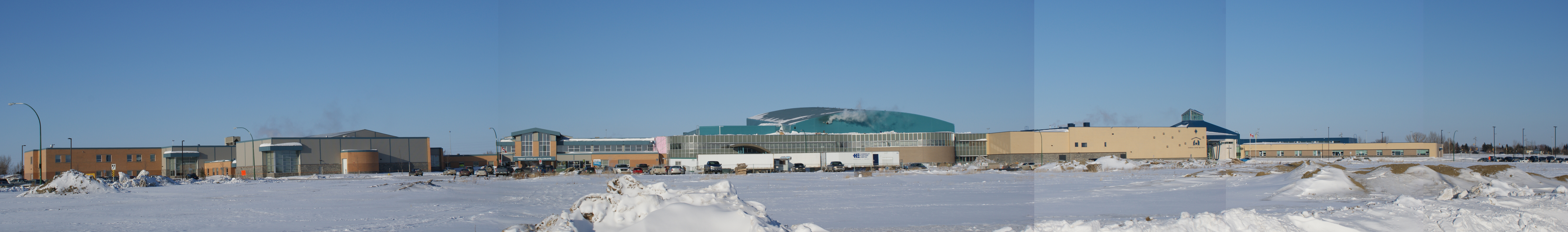
Tommy Douglas Collegiate - Shaw Centre - Bethlehem High School panorama
