= Confederation Sector =

- Sector
- Interactive map of Confederation Sector
- Country: Canada
- Province: Saskatchewan
- City: Saskatoon

Area
  - Water: 0 km^{2} (0 sq mi) 0%

Population (2021)
  - Total: 70,192
- Postal Code: S7M,
- Area code: Area code 306

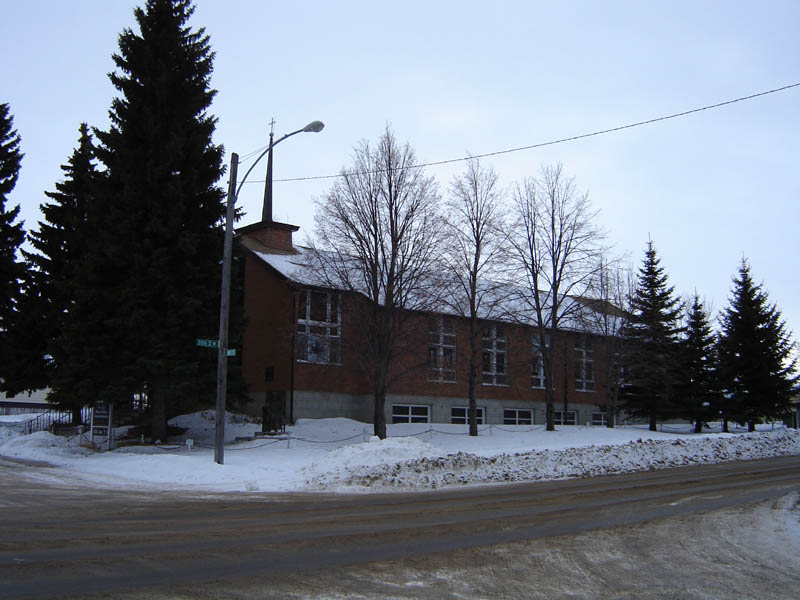
Our Lady of Czestochowa Roman Catholic Church Meadowgreen

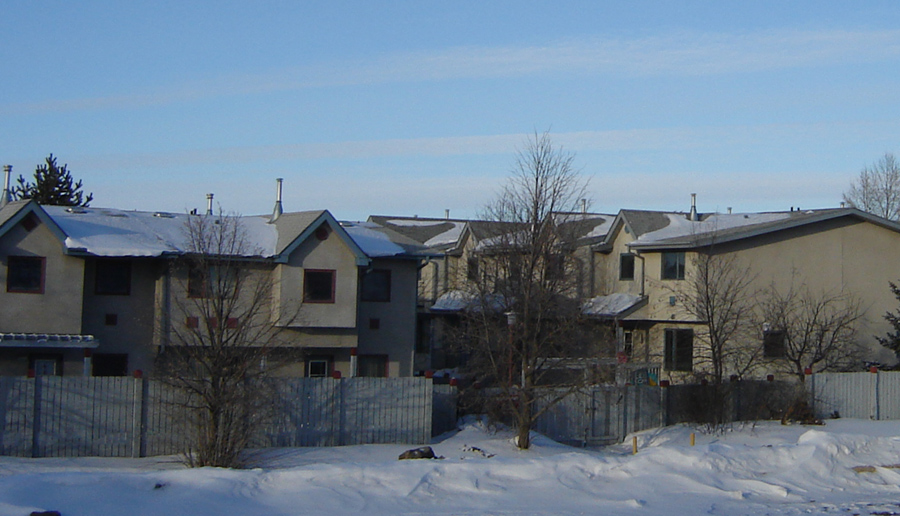
Townhouse Complex in Confederation Urban Centre

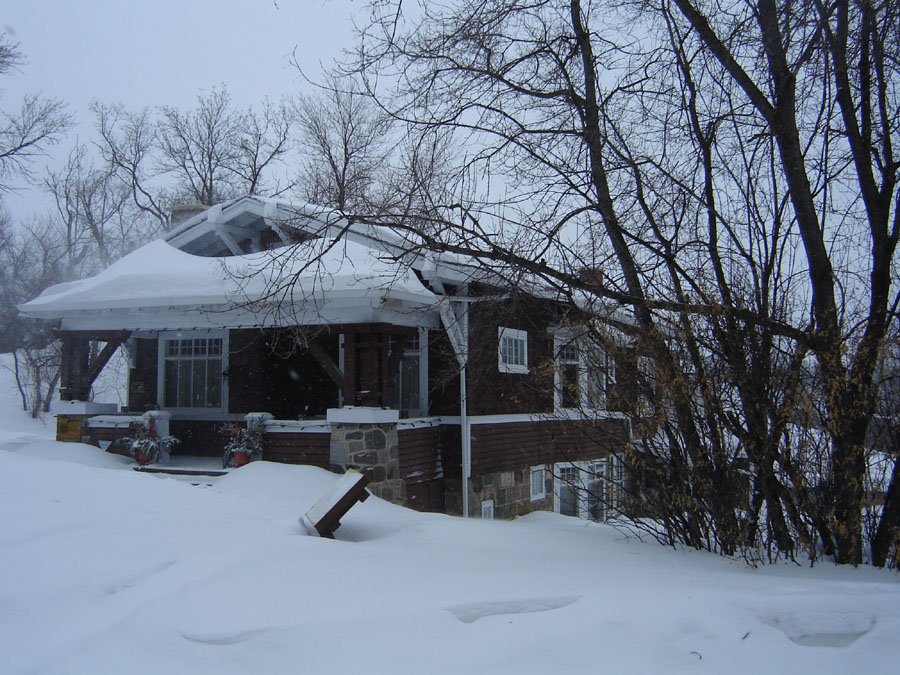
Municipal Heritage Properties Bowerman House Holiday Park

Confederation Sector, previously known as Confederation Suburban Development Area (SDA), is a sector in Saskatoon, Saskatchewan, Canada. It is a part of the west side community of Saskatoon. It lies (generally) north of the outskirts of the City and the Rural Municipality of Corman Park No. 344, west of downtown Saskatoon, and the Core Neighbourhoods Sector, south of the Riel Industrial Sector, and east of the Blairmore Sector.

== Neighbourhoods ==
- AgPro Industrial
- Confederation Park
- Confederation Urban Centre
- Dundonald
- Fairhaven
- Hampton Village
- Holiday Park
- Hudson Bay Park
- Massey Place
- Meadowgreen
- Montgomery Place
- Mount Royal
- Pacific Heights
- Parkridge
- South West Industrial
- West Industrial
- Westview

== Recreation facilities ==
- Cosmo Civic Centre & Ice Arena

== Shopping ==
- Confederation Park Mall
- Pleasant Hill Plaza
- Westgate Plaza
- Westgreen Plaza

=== See also ===
- List of shopping malls in Saskatoon

== Education ==
Confederation Sector is home to the following schools:

=== Separate education ===
==== Secondary schools ====
- E. D. Feehan High School

==== Elementary schools ====
- St. Edward School
- École Henry Kelsey
- St. Mary Community School
- Caroline Robins Community School

=== Public education ===
==== Secondary schools ====
- Bedford Road Collegiate
- Mount Royal Collegiate
- Mount Royal West

Secondary Schools of Saskatoon

==== Elementary schools ====
- College Park School
- Confederation Park School
- Fairhaven School
- Howard Coad School
- King George School
- Pleasant Hill School
- W.P. Bate School

== Library ==
Carlyle King Branch

== Transportation ==
22nd Street (Highway 7 and Highway 14) is a major thoroughfare through Saskatoon. Highway 7 connects Saskatoon with Calgary, Alberta, while Highway 14 connects with Asquith, Biggar, Wilkie, Unity, and Macklin en route to Alberta. The Circle Drive ring road also passes through the area.

=== City transit ===
The following routes serve the area, all meeting at the bus terminal at Confederation Mall.

- 1 Westview – Wildwood
- 2 Meadowgreen – 8th Street
- 3 Riversdale – College Park
- 4 Dundonald – Willowgrove
- 5 Fairhaven – Briarwood
- 22 City Centre – McCormack
- 23 Hampton Village – Shaw Centre
- 50 Pacific Heights – Lakeview
- 60 Confederation – Lakeridge
