= Saskatoon bear spray attacks =

Crimes in Saskatoon, Canada

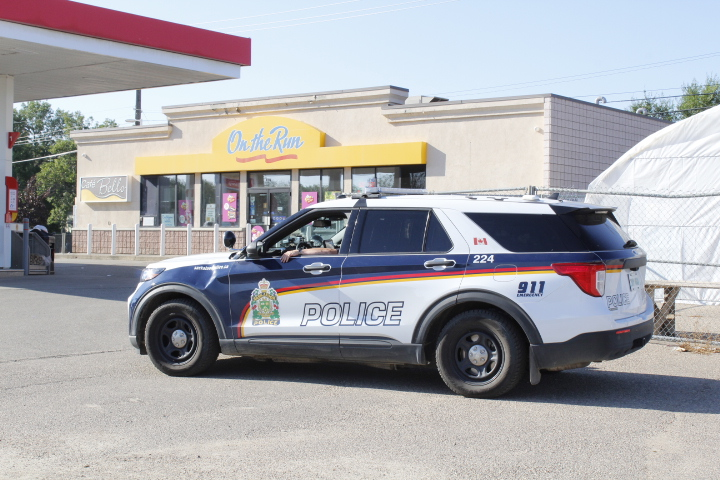
Saskatoon Police Service has received thousands of reports of bear spray attacks from 2020 to 2025.

Bear spray attacks are an ongoing concern in which a large wave of bear spray attacks have taken place in Saskatoon, Saskatchewan in the early and mid 2020s. These are considered criminal offences, as they fall under laws for assault. In 2025, the Saskatoon City Council introduced new municipal bylaws to help combat the prevalence of these attacks. These attacks have been a subject of public interest and concern since 2020, where a Saskatoon Police Service superintendent suggested that the sale of bear spray should be banned in Saskatoon, citing weekly police responses to bear spray attacks. Bear spray attacks are prominent in other cities and municipalities in Saskatchewan; from 2020 to 2024, police responded to over 3,000 incidents. A growing amount of bear spray attacks from 2022 to 2025 have been perpetrated by young adults.

== Frequency ==
Of 3,000 reported bear spray attacks in Saskatchewan from 2021 to 2025, 1099 occurred in Saskatoon.

Number of Reported Bear Spray Attacks in Saskatoon, as of July 2025
	2021	2022	2023	2024	2025 (as of July)	Notes
Number of Reported Incidents	185	180	364	367	258	
Change From Previous Year (%)	N/A	▼2.7%	▲102.22%	▲0.82%	▼29.7%	
Number of Incidents Involving Youth Perpetrators	12	N/A	N/A	74	N/A	Although data has not been compiled regarding the number of bear spray attacks perpetrated by youth in 2022, 2023, or 2025, the number of incidents had increased by 500% from 2021 to 2024.

== Notable Incidents ==
=== 2020 ===
- On 4 May 2020, a fifteen-year-old boy attacked a thirteen-year-old boy with bear spray in a park behind wâhkôhtowin School in Confederation Park. Police charged him with assault with a weapon, carrying a concealed weapon, possession of a dangerous weapon and wearing a disguise with intent, while a second suspect was released without charges.
- On 28 May 2020, a woman committed two separate bear spray attacks, with three victims. The first attack was on a 13-year-old girl and 17-year-old boy in Confederation Park. The second attack was against a man in a parking lot in Mount Royal.
- On 7 June 2020, three people were victimised in a bear spray attack in Fairhaven.
- On 19 June 2020, a 21-year-old man attacked two other men with bear spray in the Nutana neighbourhood. The three men had allegedly gotten into a disagreement over a drug deal.
- On 17 September 2020, a 53-year-old man and a 41-year-old woman were attacked with bear spray in a motel in Mayfair.

=== 2021 ===
- On 27 October 2021, a man attacked five people, including two young children, in an apartment in Dundonald. He was charged by police the following day.
- On 28 December 2021, an armed robber assaulted several people with bear spray in a residence in College Park East. One man suffered a gunshot wound.

=== 2022 ===
- In August 2022, three separate bear spray attacks occurred across six days during Prairieland Park's "Exhibition". Multiple people, including an infant, were injured and had to be treated by paramedics. Most notably, at 9:15 p.m. on the 13th of August, bear spray was deployed in the park's Grand Stand during a Trooper (band) concert. Fifty people were affected. In November of that year, a 26-year-old man was charged for the attack.
- In October 2022, two teenagers attacked a victim with bear spray at Mount Royal Collegiate. They had also been carrying a concealed firearm.

=== 2023 ===
- On 3 January 2023, two victims were assaulted with knives and bear spray on a Saskatoon Transit bus. They were hospitalised after the incident.
- On 17 March 2023, two teen boys were caught with bear spray and imitation firearms outside of E. D. Feehan Catholic High School.
- On 26 October 2023, a woman deployed bear spray at a shopping centre in the Central Business District as an attempt to flee from a robbery.

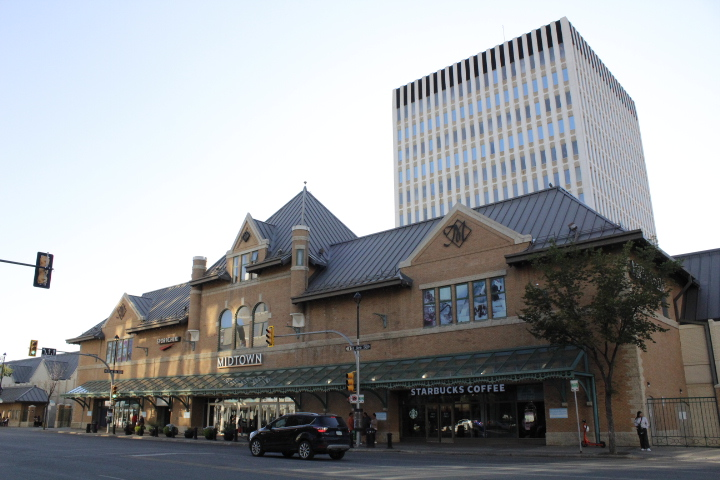
Midtown Plaza, the site of multiple bear spray attacks in Saskatoon

=== 2024 ===
- In June 2024, two teenagers were charged with assault and criminal mischief after deploying bear spray on a Saskatoon Transit bus in Fairhaven.
- In October 2024, over twenty bear spray attacks were recorded. Three attacks were recorded on the 3rd of October, including one which caused Mount Royal Collegiate to be evacuated.
- On 28 November 2024, a thirteen-year-old boy discharged bear spray in the food court of Midtown Plaza.

=== 2025 ===
- On the weekend of 22–23 February 2025, Saskatoon Police Service received ten calls for bear spray incidents. A 16-year-old girl deployed bear spray on a Saskatoon Transit bus. A man attacked a security guard with bear spray in a stairwell at Midtown Plaza. A man was attacked at a restaurant on Saskatoon's 8th Street.
- On 7 April 2025, a 13-year-old boy assaulted another youth with bear spray in the food court of The Centre. The mall had to close for the day following the incident.
- On 10 April 2025, bear spray was deployed at a bus stop next to Walter Murray Collegiate, in which two students had to receive medical treatment.
- In May 2025, a man was charged with assault with a weapon after he deployed bear spray against another man during an altercation outside of a Saskatoon nightclub.
- On 26 July 2025, a man committed two acts of assault with bear spray. He assaulted and robbed a woman in the Pleasant Hill neighbourhood, and, later that day, assaulted a man one block away.

== Legislative Action ==
Both the provincial and municipal governments have introduced legislation to help curb the number bear spray attacks in Saskatoon and in Saskatchewan. On 1 August 2025, the provincial government enacted the Safe Public Spaces (Street Weapons) Act, which applies to Saskatchewan municipalities and First Nations on an opt-in basis. The Act prohibits persons from possessing bear spray or other items deemed as "street weapons" in public places, as well as in private businesses without consent of the owner. Those who violate the Act can be charged with a provincial offence and can be subject to fines and imprisonment. Additionally, Saskatoon City Council amended its Business License Bylaw on 30 July 2025 to restrict unauthorised sales of bear spray. Under the new bylaw, businesses must keep a registry of persons who have purchased bear spray, bear spray must be sold out of public view, businesses must ask for two pieces of identification, and businesses are not permitted to sell bear spray to minors under eighteen years of age. The changes were well received by community members.
