= Hudson Bay Park, Saskatoon =

Hudson Bay Park
- Neighbourhood
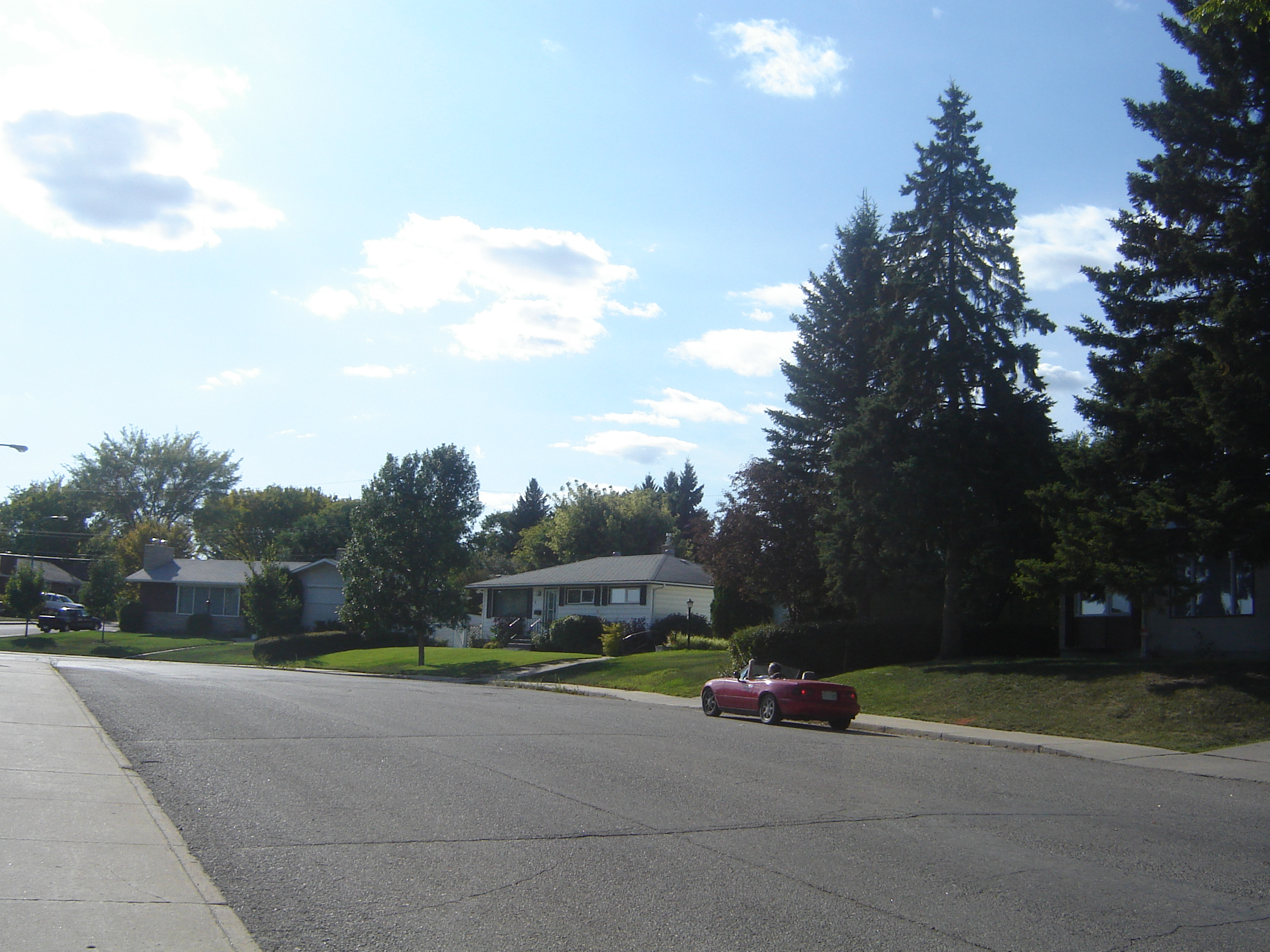
- Hudson Bay Park Streetscape
- Interactive map of Hudson Bay Park
- Coordinates: 52.145278°N 106.693333°W
- Country: Canada
- Province: Saskatchewan
- City: Saskatoon
- Suburban Development Area: Confederation SDA
- Neighbourhood: Hudson Bay Park
- Construction: 1940 and 1960

Government
  - Type: Municipal (Ward 1)
  - Administrative body: Saskatoon City Council
  - Councillor: Darren Hill

Population (2006)
  - Total: 1,830
  - Average Income: $45,194
- Time zone: UTC-6 (UTC)

Hudson Bay Park is geographically located in north west Saskatoon just south of Circle Drive along 33rd Street and Avenue P North. It is mainly characterized by single detached homes along with apartments that are less than five stories in height. Oliver Place and St. Joseph's Home are seniors residences located in this residential neighbourhood. This locale honours the pioneers of Saskatoon, as well as providing two very large park spaces which curve through the neighbourhood. The community was under construction mainly during the post war years between 1940 and 1960 when there was a housing shortage. The land for this neighbourhood was annexed during the City expansion around the time of 1910 to 1915. Following elementary school, students usually attend Mount Royal Collegiate in the neighboring area of Mount Royal or E.D. Feehan Catholic High School on Avenue M North a part of Westmount community. In 2006, the average family size was 2.1 residents. ^{Statistics c2005 -}

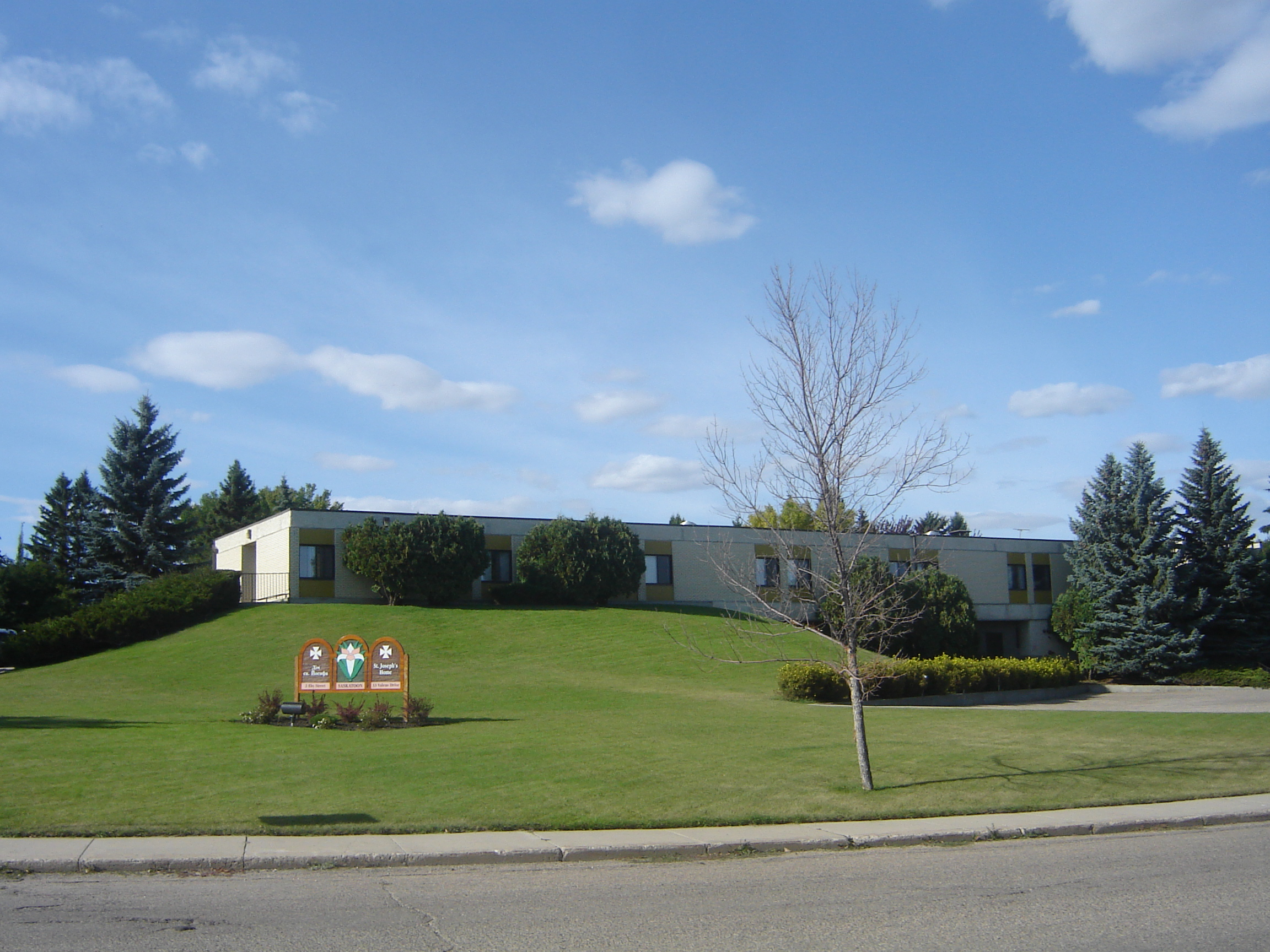
St. Joseph's Home

== History ==
- The Forestry Expo 2005 was recently held at Vic Rempel City Yards. In 2005, Mayfair School toured the yards as part of the Schools Plant Legacy in Trees (SPLIT) program which promotes educational tree planting. The greenhouses and nursery of Vic Rempel City Yards often hot various school classes.
- The roadways are mainly named after settlers and Saskatoon pioneers.

City of Saskatoon Neighbourhoods
Street Name	Pioneer
Bowerman St.	Allen Bowerman, a prominent developer
Howell Ave	
Stewart Ave	
John East Ave	John East Iron Works
Valens Dr.	VALENS, Dr. John A.
Donald St.	
Faulkner Cres.	Faulkner, Norman
Eby St.	Mr. James Eby
Tiffin Cres.	

== Education ==
École Henry Kelsey School
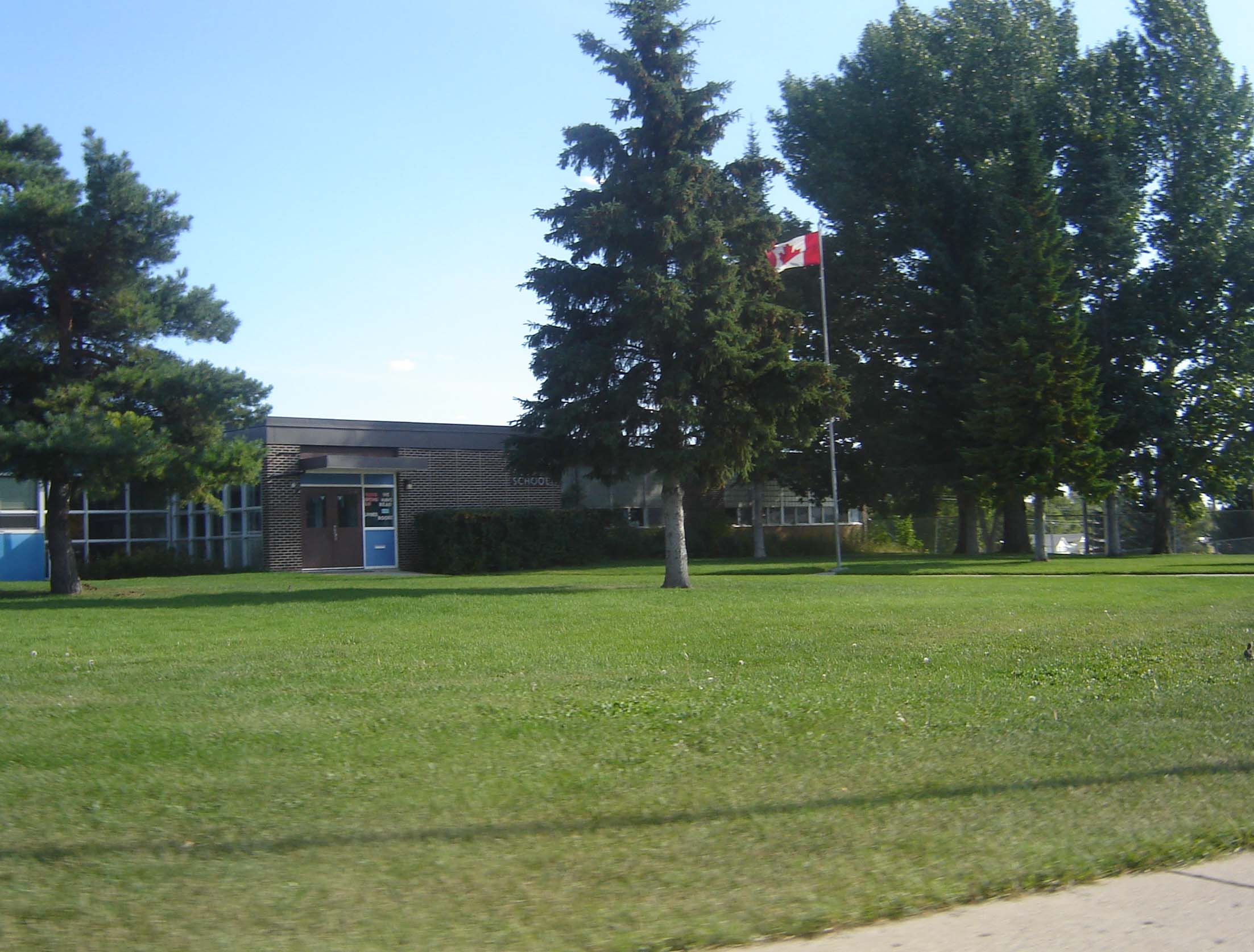

Location
- 16 Valens Drive; Saskatoon, Saskatchewan, S7L 3S1; Canada

Information
- Type: Elementary
- School board: Saskatoon Public School Division
- Principal: Don McBean
- Enrollment: 344 (2017)
- Education system: Public
- Language: English, French
- Feeder to: Bedford Road Collegiate
- Website: École Henry Kelsey School

St. Edward School
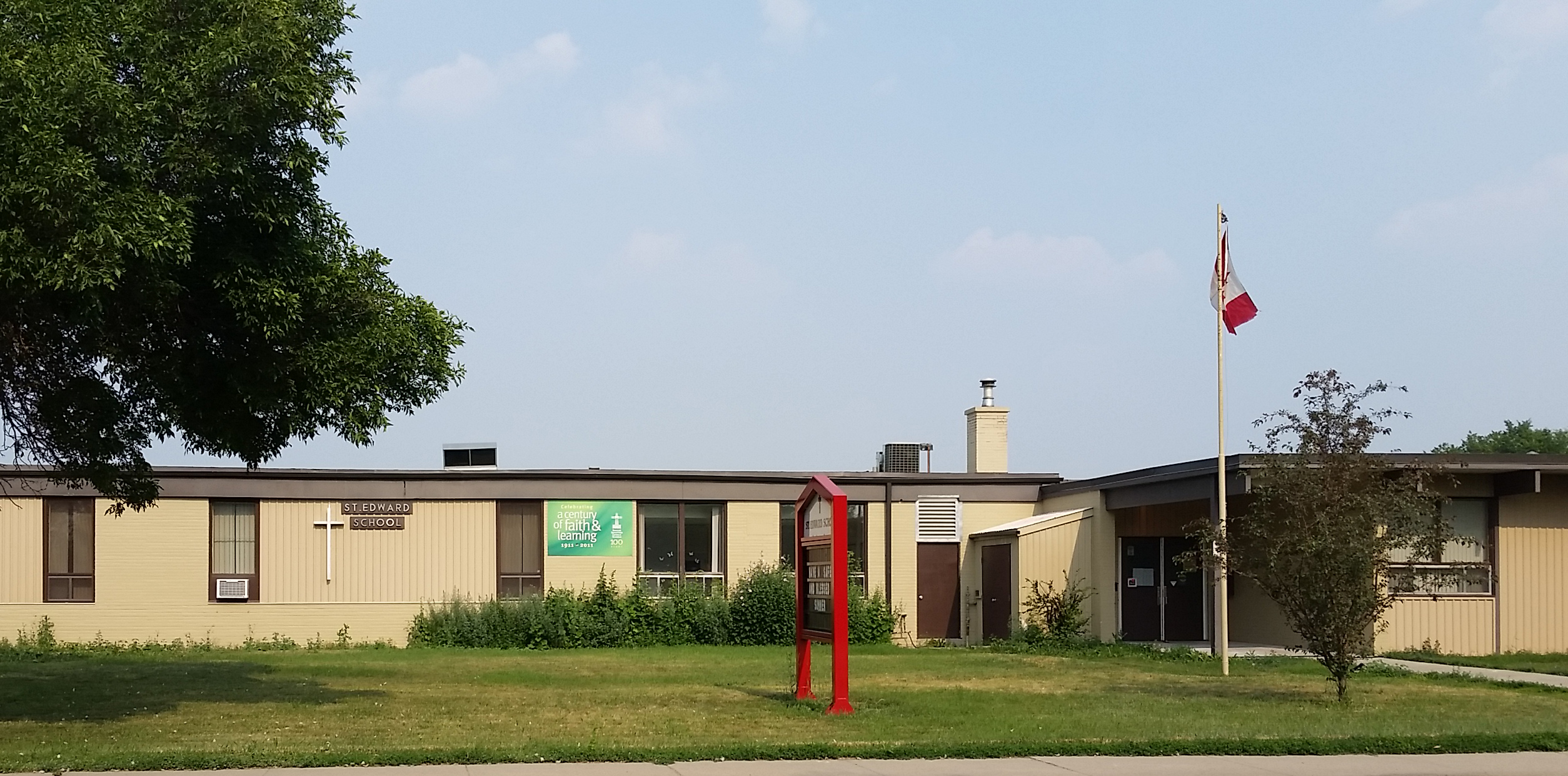

Location
- 1002 Avenue P North; Saskatoon, Saskatchewan, S7L 2W7; Canada

Information
- Type: Elementary
- Religious affiliation: Catholic
- Opened: 1957
- School board: Greater Saskatoon Catholic Schools
- Principal: Theresa Laroque
- Grades: Pre-Kindergarten to Grade 8
- Enrollment: 188 (2017)
- Education system: Separate
- Language: English
- Feeder to: E. D. Feehan High School
- Website: St. Edward School

- École Henry Kelsey School - public elementary, part of the Saskatoon Public School Division
- St. Edward School - separate (Catholic) elementary, part of Greater Saskatoon Catholic Schools

== Government and politics ==
Hudson Bay Park exists within the federal electoral district of Saskatoon West. It is currently represented by Sheri Benson of the New Democratic Party, first elected in 2015.

Provincially, the area is mostly within the constituency of Saskatoon Westview. It is currently represented by David Buckingham of the Saskatchewan Party, first elected in 2016. A small portion of the neighbourhood southwest of 33rd Street and Avenue I is within the constituency of Saskatoon Centre.

In Saskatoon's non-partisan municipal politics, Hudson Bay Park lies within ward 1. It is currently represented by Darren Hill, first elected in 2006.

== Area Parks ==
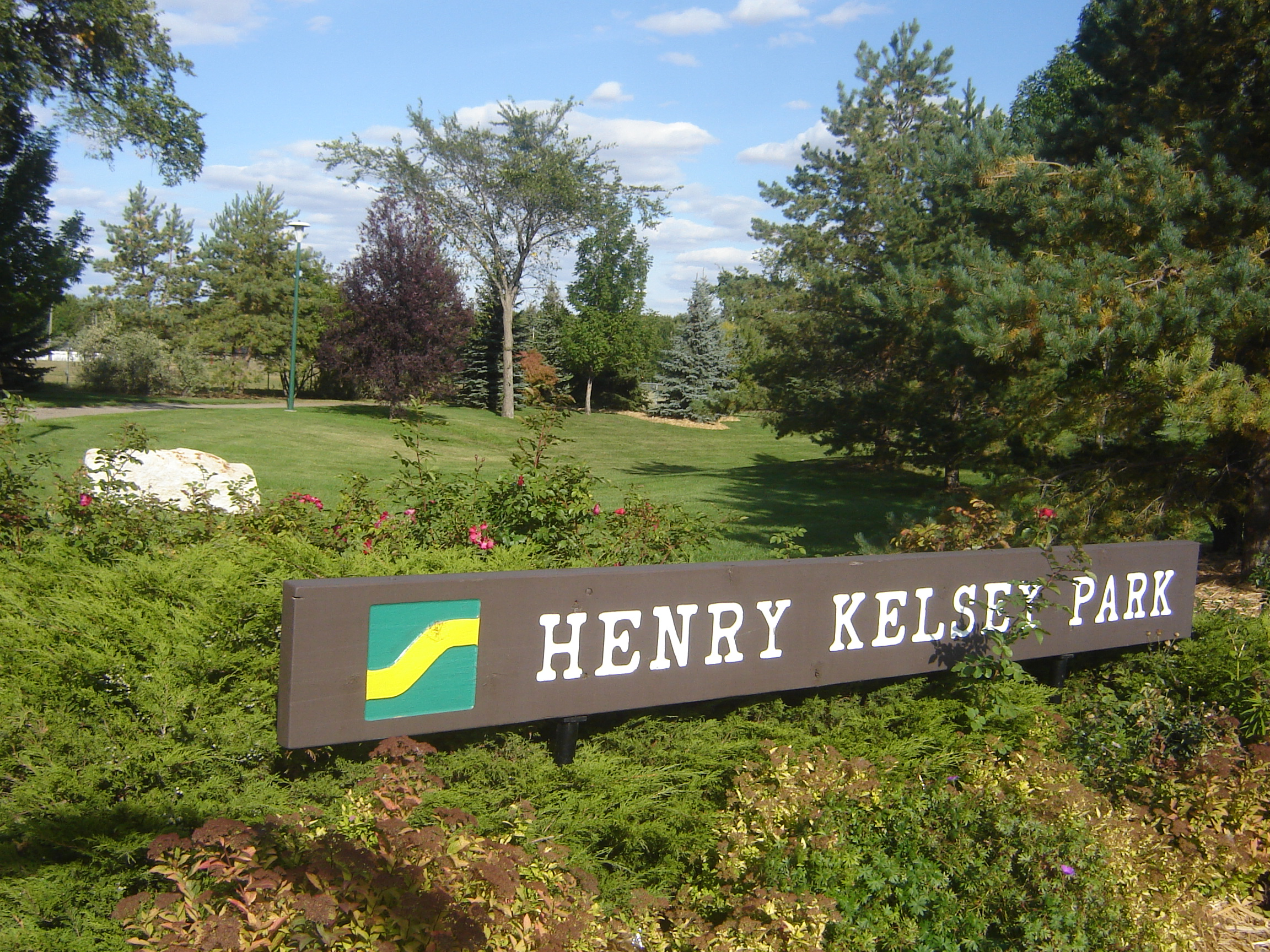
Henry Kelsey park

- Henry Kelsey Neighbourhood Park - 8.01 acres (32,400 m^{2})
- Pierre Radisson Park - 24.88 acres (100,700 m^{2})
- Henry Kelsey District Park - 24.12 acres (97,600 m^{2})
- Riversdale Kiwanis Park - 15.09 acres (61,100 m^{2})

These parks host a variety of activities such as sports, recreational, play and fitness.

== Transportation ==
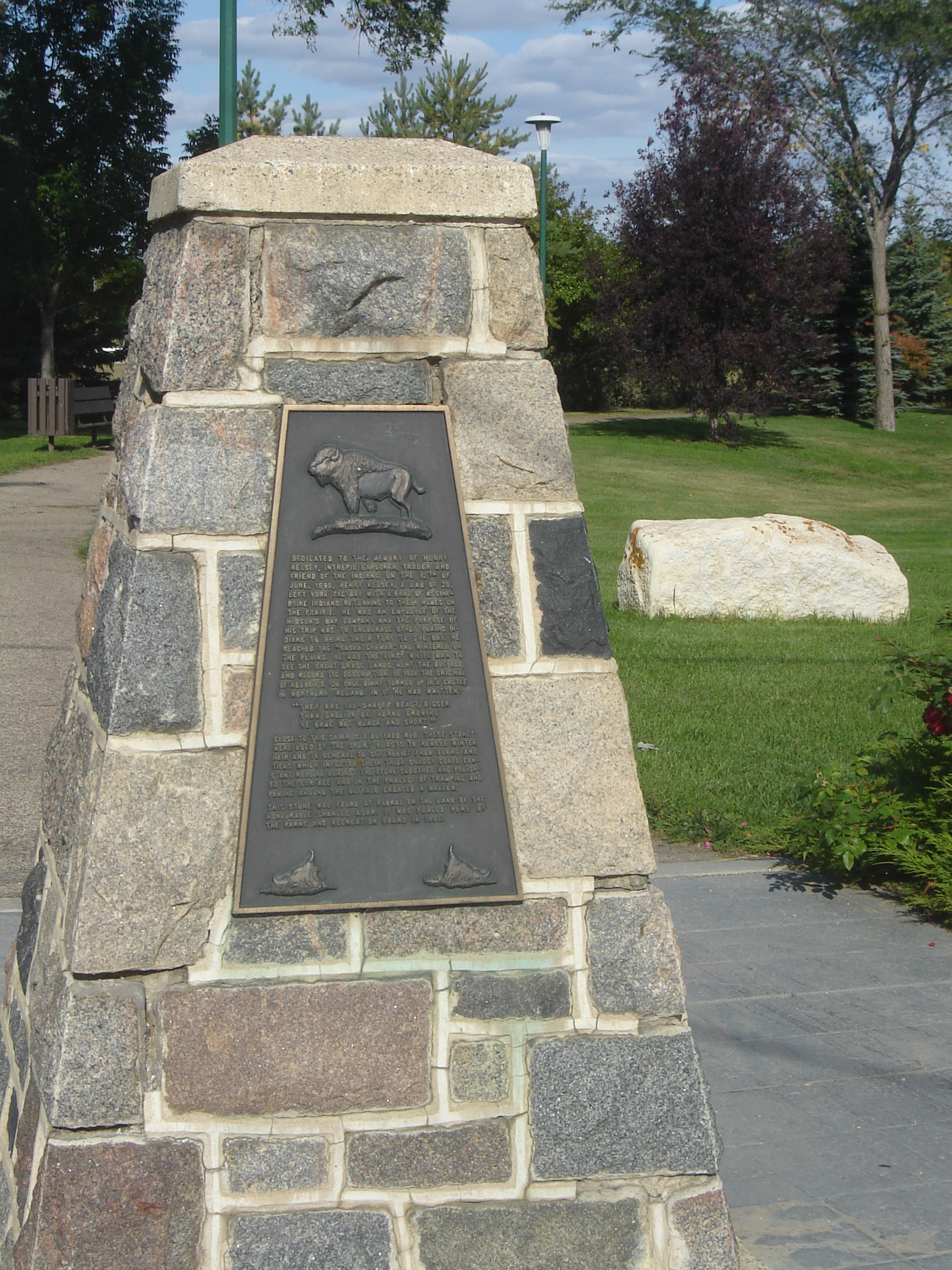
Henry Kelsey monument

Circle Drive is a main thoroughfare through Saskatoon which connects with 33rd Street which runs through Hudson Bay Park.

=== City Transit ===
Hudson Bay Park is serviced by the City Transit Bus Route 3 (Hudson Bay Park/City Centre) & Route 7 (Dundonald/City Centre) of Saskatoon Transit.

== Layout ==
The furthest roads to the east are Avenue H North (southerly section) and Avenue I North (Northerly section). Circle Drive marks the north and west section as it runs diagonally across the corner. 31st Street is the southernmost boundary.

Riversdale Kiwanis Park is along the south west corner running along Edmonton Avenue which runs within the neighbourhood parallel to Circle Drive. City of Saskatoon Vic Rempel Yards: Greenhouses and nursery are along 33rd Street and Avenue P North. St. Edward School is on Avenue P North across the street from the City tree Nursery. Henry Kelsey Park is along Avenue I North and Howell Avenue in the North east corner. Henry Kelsey School is located in the southern edge of the park along 33rd Street East.

=== See also ===
- List of shopping malls in Saskatoon

== Life ==
Kelsey Community Association provides recreational activities for the neighbourhoods of Kelsey, Hudson Bay, McNab Park, and Mayfair.
