= Westview, Saskatoon =

Westview
- Neighbourhood
- Interactive map of Westview
- Coordinates: 52°8′56″N 106°42′18″W
- Country: Canada
- Province: Saskatchewan
- City: Saskatoon
- Suburban Development Area: Confederation SDA

Government
  - Type: Municipal (Ward )
  - Administrative body: Saskatoon City Council
  - Councillor: Troy Davies
  - MLA: David Buckingham
  - MP: Brad Redekopp
- Time zone: UTC-6 (CST)

Westview is a suburban community in the Confederation Suburban Development Area (SDA) of Saskatoon, Saskatchewan. Originally named "Tuxedo Park" by real estate developers in 1912, the area remained undeveloped until the 1960s. The east half of Westview is located on land annexed by the city in 1911, while the western half did not become part of Saskatoon until 1960.

The majority of development occurred in the 1970s and 1980s (although the neighbourhood, with the more-or-less current street layout, had appeared on city street maps as early as 1961). The neighbourhood was finally completed in the late 1990s. Located in what was at the time the northwest corner of the city, the neighbourhood was on the city's western edge, giving its residents a true "West view". Unlike its Eastview counterpart, all street names don't begin with the word "West". The population of Westview was 3,441 in 2006.

The community was originally identified as Westview Heights, but the second word was dropped from the official community name in the 1980s.

The Westview neighbourhood is bounded to the north by 37th Street, Circle Drive on the east and Junor Avenue on the west and 33rd Street to the south.

== Demographics ==
The population of Westview was 3,441 in 2006, with an average family income of $54,374. The average household size is 2.8 residents, and approximately 60.8% of the residents own their own home. According to MLS data, the average sale price of a home as of 2013 was $316,200.

== Governance ==
Westview exists within the federal electoral district of Saskatoon West. It is currently represented by Brad Redekopp of the Conservative Party of Canada, first elected in 2019.

Provincially, the area is within the constituency of Saskatoon Westview. It is currently represented by David Buckingham of the Saskatchewan Party, first elected in 2016.

In Saskatoon's non-partisan municipal politics, Westview lies within ward 4. It is currently represented by Troy Davies, first elected in 2012.

== Public services ==
Westview is a part of the northwest division of the Saskatoon Police Services patrol system. This division services northwest of the South Saskatchewan River which encompasses the eighteen neighbourhoods, five industrial areas as well as the Airport Management Area and Agriplace areas. The three Saskatoon hospitals are located in other nearby neighbourhoods. St. Paul's Hospital is located in Pleasant Hill, Royal University Hospital is located in the University of Saskatchewan Land Management area, and Saskatoon City Hospital is located in City Park. Water is treated and supplied by the City of Saskatoon Water and Wastewater Treatment Branch. Westview is served by the City of Saskatoon Saskatoon Fire & Protective Services.

== Education ==
=== Education ===
Caroline Robins Community School
- 1410 Byers Crescent; Saskatoon, Saskatchewan, S7L 4H3; Canada

Information
- Type: Elementary
- School board: Saskatoon Public Schools
- Principal: Tiffany Smith
- Grades: Kindergarten to Grade 8
- Enrollment: 402 (2017)
- Education system: Public
- Language: English
- Colours: Blue, Yellow
- Feeder to: Mount Royal Collegiate
- Website: Caroline Robins Community School

- Caroline Robins Community School currently serves the neighbourhood for students who attend the Public school system, while students who attend the Catholic school system attend Bishop Klein School, located on Northumberland Avenue & 33rd Street in Massey Place.

== Shopping ==
A strip mall on 2410 Richardson Road services this community directly. Confederation Mall Shopping Centre in the Confederation Urban Centre is also nearby, as well as the Saskatoon Co-Op grocery store on 33rd Street.

== Area parks ==
- Dr. Seager Wheeler Park - 17.4 acres (70,000 m^{2})
- Sen. J. Hnatyshyn Park - 3.3 acres (13,000 m^{2})
- Sen. James Gladstone Park North - 5.9 acres (24,000 m^{2})
- Sen. James Gladstone Park South - 5.8 acres (23,000 m^{2})

== Transportation ==
Route 7 (Dundonald/City Centre) services the neighbourhood boundary on 33rd Street, Route 22 (Montgomery/City Centre) & Route 63 (Hampton Village) of Saskatoon Transit

== Lifestyle ==
Caroline Robins School hosts a number of sports and recreational programs set out by the Westview Community Association.

== Layout ==
Caroline Robins School nestles into the west end of Dr. Seager Wheeler Park. Senator James Gladstone Park divides in the south and east edges along Glenwood Avenue while Sen. J. Hnatyshyn Park lies at the corner of Catherwood Avenue and Richardson Road. Unlike Eastview, the streets in the neighbourhood with exception of Avenues W & Y and 33rd & 37th Streets are named after prominent figures in Saskatoon's history. The majority of the neighbourhood is laid out in the crescent system as the city was beginning to shy away from the grid layout. The northwest corner of the neighbourhood which saw the construction of Lewis Crescent, Peterson Crescent, Court and Terrace along with the 37th Street extension from west of Byers Crescent to Junor Avenue took place between 1996 and 1999.
