= Meadowgreen, Saskatoon =

Meadowgreen
- Neighborhood
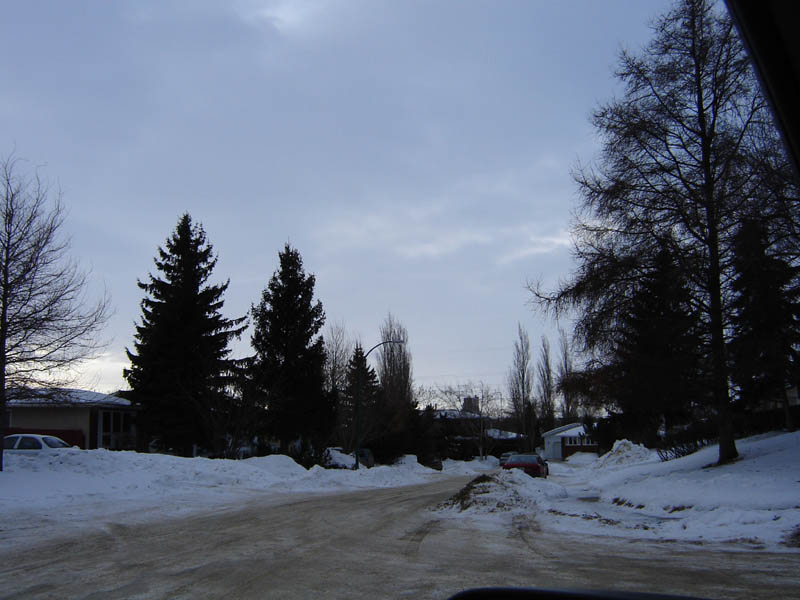
- Appleby Place, A Court in Meadowgreen of Detached Residential Homes
- Interactive map of Meadowgreen
- Coordinates: 52°07′08″N 106°42′41″W
- Country: Canada
- Province: Saskatchewan
- City: Saskatoon
- Suburban Development Area: Confederation SDA
- Neighbourhood: Meadowgreen

Government
  - Type: Municipal (Ward 2)
  - Administrative body: Saskatoon City Council
  - Councillor: Hilary Gough

Area
  - Total: 1.2283 km^{2} (0.4742 sq mi)

Population (2006)
  - Total: 3,860
  - Density: 3,140/km^{2} (8,140/sq mi)
  - Average Income: $37,541
- Time zone: UTC−6 (UTC)

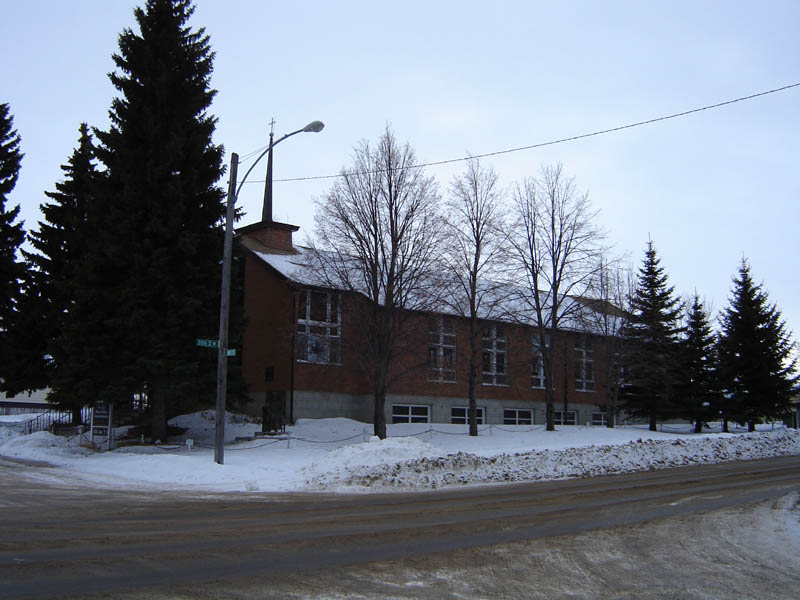
Our Lady of Czestochowa Roman Catholic Church

Meadowgreen is a neighbourhood located on the west side of the city in the Confederation Suburban Development Area in the city of Saskatoon, Saskatchewan, Canada. Meadowgreen is surrounded by an abundance of green space and walking trails without being a riverside neighbourhood. The buffer zone along Circle Drive has a newly created walking trail. The southern buffer zone along 11th Street connects to the east with Fred Mendel Park of the Pleasant Hill neighbourhood and to the west with the off leash dog run located in the Confederation Urban Centre neighbourhood. As well the newly re-located Meadowgreen Park and Peter Pond Park provide leisure activities such as basketball courts and playgrounds. Within the Confederation SDA of Saskatoon, the neighborhood of Meadowgreen comprises the area south of 22nd Street, north of the buffer zone between 11th Street and Appleby Drive, east of Circle Drive, and west of Avenue W South. Until the 1990s the portion of the community north of 18th Street was considered part of the Pleasant Hill community until the City of Saskatoon reorganized its community boundaries.

With a population of 3,860, Meadowgreen has a slightly higher population than Adelaide/Churchill at 3,535. The nearby community of Mount Royal is the next largest of Saskatoon's subdivisions at 4,110 persons. The Saskatchewan provincial town of Battleford is the rural area in with the closest population size. Battleford's population was 3,685 on the 2006 Census, and 3,820 persons as of 2001 compared to the Saskatoon neighbourhood of Meadowgreen's population of 2001 at 3,860. Battleford is sprawled over 5,764.968 acres (23.33000 km^{2}) or 23.33 km², whereas Meadowgreen is within 303.53 acres (1.2283 km^{2}) or 1.22834 km². Where Battleford shows total dwellings of 1,485, Meadowgreen has 1,560 dwellings.

== Government and politics ==
Meadowgreen exists within the federal electoral district of Saskatoon West. It is currently represented by Sheri Benson of the New Democratic Party, first elected in 2015.

Provincially, the area is divided by 20th Street into two constituencies. The southern portion lies within the constituency of Saskatoon Riversdale. It is currently represented by Danielle Chartier of the Saskatchewan New Democratic Party (NDP), first elected in a 2009 by-election. The northern portion lies within the constituency of Saskatoon Centre. It is currently represented by David Forbes of the NDP, first elected in a 2001 by-election.

In Saskatoon's non-partisan municipal politics, Meadowgreen lies within ward 2. It is currently represented by Hilary Gough, first elected in 2016.

== Education ==
W.P. Bate Community School
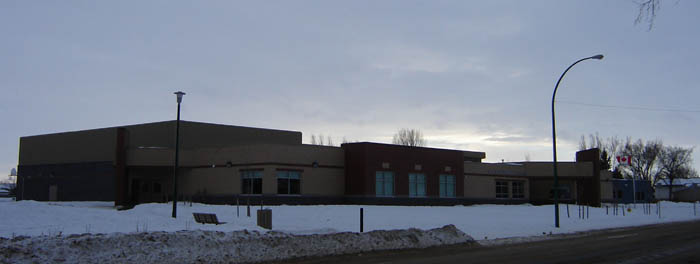
- 2515 18th Street West; Saskatoon, Saskatchewan, S7M 4A9; Canada

Information
- Type: Elementary
- Established: 1961
- School board: Saskatoon Public Schools
- Principal: Stacey Salter
- Grades: Kindergarten to Grade 8
- Enrollment: 342 (2017)
- Education system: Public
- Language: English
- Feeder to: Mount Royal Collegiate
- Website: W.P. Bate Community School

- W.P. Bate School was originally located at 342 Ottawa Avenue South. It opened in 1961 and was named in honour of William Pope Bate (1866 - 1934), who had been a long-time secretary-treasurer of Saskatoon Public Schools in its early days. In September 2006, the school relocated to a new location at 2515 18th Street West. The school namesake, W. P. Bate, homesteaded nearby at NW Section 24 Township 36 Range 5 W of the 3rd Meridian, provisional District of Saskatchewan, North-West Territories and received his dominion land grant patent Oct 31, 1892.

== Demographics ==
There are 3,860 people living in this area of Saskatoon, with the 34% of this population being employed in sales and service, the main occupation of this neighbourhood. The average income as of 2006 was $37,541 enabling an average house market value of $105,527. 770 of the 1,560 homes are detached residences, the majority built between 1960 and 1980. According to MLS data, the average sale price of a home as of 2013 was $220,928.

== Parks ==
- Cahill Park - 1.48 acres (6,000 m^{2})
- Meadowgreen Park -
- Peter Pond Park - 1.62 acres (6,600 m^{2})
- Kate Waygood Park, recently built in 2011.

W.P. Bate School opened January 2006, exchanging places with Meadowgreen Park.

== Religious institutions ==
- Meadowgreen House for All Nations
- Chan Tam Buddhist Congregation Saskatoon Inc.
- Our Lady of Czestochowa Roman Catholic Services
- Pleasant Hill Mennonite Church was built in 1953, however services began as early as 1928.

== Recycling ==
Meadowgreen Recycle Depot - Corner of 22nd St. W. and Witney Ave.

== Transportation ==
=== City transit ===
Meadowgreen is serviced by the Saskatoon Transit bus Route #2 (Meadowgreen/City Centre) & Route 10 (Pleasant Hill/City Centre).

== History ==
The land for Meadowgreen was annexed by the city of Saskatoon between 1955 and 1959. Approximately 33% of the dwellings were built in the 1960s, and 45% built in the 1970s.

== Layout ==
The area south of 18th Street, north of the buffer zone between 11th Street and Appleby Drive, east of Circle Drive, and west of Avenue W South is laid out in a court system. The northern portion is laid out grid fashion; avenues run alphabetically north and south, Streets run numerically east and west. After Avenue Y South, the Avenues are named after Canadian cities such as Montreal, Ottawa, Winnipeg and Vancouver. Witney Avenue is the only anomaly to the naming convention, and is named in lieu of having an Avenue Z. Prior to the construction of the Circle Drive and 22nd Street interchange, motorists were able to access the Fairhaven neighborhood from Meadowgreen via 18th Street through a signalized grade crossing intersection at Clancy Drive and Circle Drive, and also off Circle Drive via 20th Street. Prior to a heated debate, the initial plan called for the intersection of 18th Street/Clancy Drive and Circle Drive to remain as the interchange called for no access to eastbound 22nd Street from southbound Circle Drive as the 20th Street intersection would cease to exist when construction started. Fearing an increased volume in traffic along 18th Street, a re-drawing saw a leg of Camponi Crescent become part of the interchange and access to 18th Street from Circle Drive would cease to exist, leaving access to Circle Drive from either 11th or 22nd Streets. The 18th Street/Circle Drive intersection was closed to traffic in 2001, and all traces of the roadway between Circle and the CN rail line were permanently removed in 2002, however the signalized grade crossing intersection at Circle Drive and Clancy Drive remains as it was reconfigured to a layout similar to that of the intersection of Circle Drive and Laurier Drive following the closure of 18th Street. The net result is there is currently no direct access to Meadowgreen from the west; however 18th Street could possibly be reconnected if an overpass/interchange is ever constructed at Circle and Clancy.

== Life ==
Meadowgreen Community Association operates out of W.P. Bate School to provide leisure activities for the area.
