= Confederation Mall =

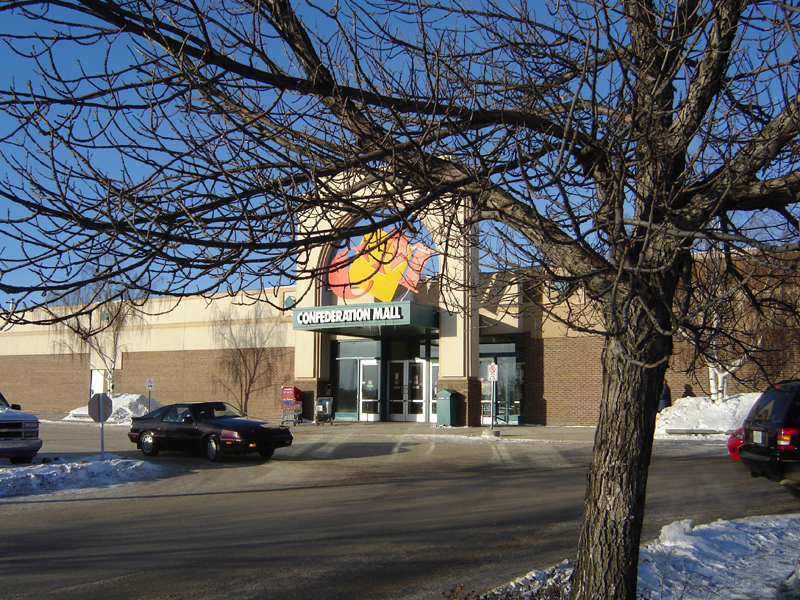
- Confederation Mall Main Entrance
- Location: Saskatoon, Saskatchewan, Canada
- Coordinates: 52°07′57″N 106°43′17″W
- Address: 300 Confederation Drive
- Opened: 1973
- Num. of stores: 42
- Num. of anchor tenants: 4
- Floor area: 329,128 sq ft (30,577.0 m^{2})
- Floors: 1
- Website: www.confedmall.ca

Confederation Mall is a 329,128 sq. ft. shopping mall located at 22nd Street and Circle Drive in Saskatoon, Saskatchewan, Canada. The mall was originally named Confederation Park Plaza when it opened in mid-1973, at which time its anchor tenants were Canada Safeway and Woolco.

The mall was originally planned for a location on Saskatoon's east side, at the southwest corner of Clarence Avenue and Circle Drive (site of the present-day Saskatoon Auto Mall), but in May 1972, the Saskatoon City Council rejected the plan, citing community concerns. As a result, the mall's developers looked to build on an alternate site on the city's west side. However, plans for a mall in the area around what is now Confederation Park had existed at least as early as 1966.

An unusual aspect of the mall is that, around the time construction began on 18 November 1972, the Saskatoon Star-Phoenix, in conjunction with mall developers Trizec Equities Ltd., hosted a "You Name It" contest inviting readers to come up with a name for the mall. A Saskatoon resident won an Air Canada flight to London and $300 for choosing the name "Confederation Park Plaza".

In 1994, Woolco became Wal-Mart, and around this same time the mall underwent an expansion that added a food court and a new Safeway store; the original Safeway location became part of the food court with the remaining space used for a third anchor tenant, initially a branch of the Family Video home video rental chain, and later Petland. Other stores include clothing stores, electronics, services, florists, banks, and jewelers.

In the summer of 2009, a new state of the art Walmart was constructed in a new power centre commercial area in the Blairmore Urban Centre several kilometres west of Confederation Mall; the only Walmart in Saskatoon to house both a McDonald's and a Tim Hortons (closed in 2022), the one in the mall closed after the 2009 holiday season and in 2010 was renovated to house a Canadian Tire (with Mark's Work Wearhouse) that opened in Spring of 2011 (in turn, the new Canadian Tire replaced a standalone location that had operated in the nearby Plaza 22 shopping centre since the 1970s) and now houses three separate retailers and a fitness centre Fit 4 Less, Dollar Tree, Sport Chek, and a Jysk. The new Canadian Tire and Marks is a standalone, as its connection to the rest of the mall was closed. This resulted in a portion of the mall being reconfigured to house a new anchor, Winners, which is accessed from inside the mall. This was followed by the launch of a major interior renovation to the mall which, as of 2015, was to expand the food court which currently today houses a Tim Hortons and a TacoTime.

== Former anchor tenants ==
- Safeway 1973-2019 (became FreshCo)
- Woolco 1973-1994 (became Walmart)
- Walmart 1994-2010 (relocated to Blairmore)
- Sport Mart 2004–2011
- Family Video (Later VHQ) 1994-2003 (relocated to Fairmont Dr in Fairhaven and has since closed)

== Confederation Transit Terminal ==
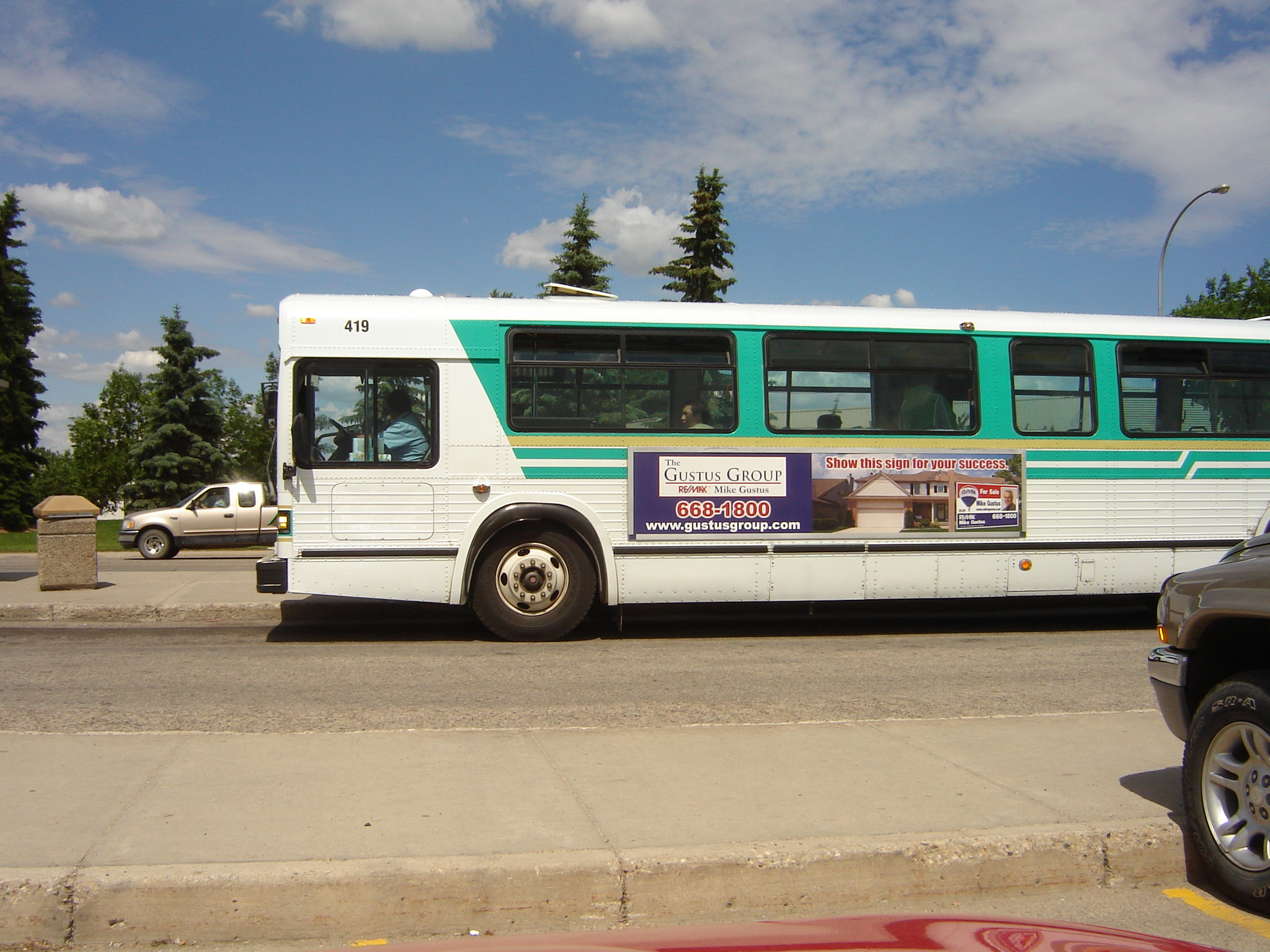
The Confederation Bus Terminal in 2008

Confederation Terminal is one of Saskatoon Transit's major bus terminals, located on Laurier Drive at the Mall's northwest exit. This terminal runs twelve routes, including five residential routes, and seven routes to the Downtown Saskatoon bus terminal.

=== Residential Routes ===
- Route 60 through Confederation Park
- Route 61 from Fairhaven to Massey Place via 22nd Street, with a stop at the Mall terminal.
- Route 63 from the Mall to Hampton Village via Matheson Drive.
- Route 64 from the Mall to Fairhaven and Parkridge via McCormack Road.
- Route 65 from the Mall to Kensington through Diefenbaker Drive and Centennial Drive

=== Routes to Downtown Terminal ===
- Route 2 Meadowgreen/City Centre
- Route 5 Confederation/City Centre
- Route 7 Dundonald/City Centre
- Route 9 Riversdale/City Centre
- Route 22 Confederation/City Centre (this route operates as needed during peak hours only and is not a full-service route).
- Route 60: Confederation/City Centre
- Route 65: Confederation/City Centre

== See also ==
- List of shopping malls in Saskatoon
- Confederation Urban Centre, Saskatoon
