= Perry Ganchar =

Canadian ice hockey player

- Born: October 28, 1963 (age 63) Saskatoon, Saskatchewan, Canada
- Height: 5 ft 10 in (178 cm)
- Weight: 180 lb (82 kg; 12 st 12 lb)
- Position: Right wing
- Shot: Right
- Played for: Pittsburgh Penguins; Montreal Canadiens; St. Louis Blues
- NHL draft: 113th overall, 1982; St. Louis Blues
- Playing career: 1979–1996

Perry Kenneth Ganchar (born October 28, 1963) is a Canadian former professional ice hockey forward who played 42 games in the National Hockey League for the Montreal Canadiens, St. Louis Blues, and Pittsburgh Penguins. Ganchar served as head coach for the Spokane Chiefs of the Western Hockey League for two seasons.

== Playing career ==
Ganchar played his junior hockey career with his hometown Saskatoon Blades of the Western Hockey League. During the 1982-83 season, Ganchar scored 68 goals and assisted on 48 for 116 points in 68 games, on a team which included future NHL players Brian Skrudland, Lane Lambert, Joey Kocur, Dale Henry and Trent Yawney on the roster.

Ganchar was drafted 113th overall by the St. Louis Blues in the 1982 NHL entry draft. After shuffling between the Blues and their minor league affiliates over a two-year period, Ganchar was traded to the Montreal Canadiens in exchange for Ron Flockhart on 26 August 1985.

Ganchar was unable to earn a full-time spot on the Canadiens roster, and spent the majority of the season with the team's farm affiliate in Sherbrooke. Ganchar was called up for his only game as a member of the team on 31 October 1987. The Canadiens traded Ganchar to the Pittsburgh Penguins on 17 December 1987 in exchange for future considerations.

Ganchar played 33 games with the Penguins over a two-year period, where he scored the two goals of his NHL career. Ganchar would spend the rest of his playing career with the Muskegon Lumberjacks of the International Hockey League, and would follow the franchise to Cleveland, marking his longest professional stint with one team, as he was a member of the team for eight seasons.

== Coaching career ==
Ganchar retired from active play after spending the 1995-96 season with the Cleveland Lumberjacks of the International Hockey League and pursued a career in coaching.

Ganchar remained with the Lumberjacks as an assistant coach, before being promoted to the head coach during the 1997-98 season. Ganchar would leave the team following the 1999-2000 season.

Ganchar would be named head coach of the Spokane Chiefs of the Western Hockey League, prior to the start of the 2000-01 season. Ganchar posted a 68-53-18-5 record with the Chiefs, before resigning at the end of the 2001-02 season.

Ganchar was appointed Director of Program Development for the Ohio AAA Blue Jackets, based out of the Columbus area suburb of Dublin, Ohio in 2012.

== Personal life ==
Born in Saskatoon, Saskatchewan, Ganchar attended Mount Royal Collegiate, graduating from the school in 1981.

Ganchar is married and has two children. The family resides in Dublin, Ohio.

== Career statistics ==
			Regular Season					Playoffs
Season	Team	League	GP	G	A	Pts	PIM	GP	G	A	Pts	PIM
1979–80	Saskatoon Blades	WHL	27	9	14	23	60	—	—	—	—	—
1980–81	Saskatoon Blades	WHL	62	26	53	79	117	—	—	—	—	—
1981–82	Saskatoon Blades	WHL	53	38	52	90	82	5	3	3	6	17
1982–83	Saskatoon Blades	WHL	68	68	48	116	105	6	1	4	5	24
1982–83	Salt Lake Golden Eagles	CHL	—	—	—	—	—	1	0	1	1	0
1983–84	St. Louis Blues	NHL	1	0	0	0	0	7	3	1	4	0
1983–84	Montana Magic	CHL	59	23	22	45	77	—	—	—	—	—
1984–85	St. Louis Blues	NHL	7	0	2	2	0	—	—	—	—	—
1984–85	Peoria Rivermen	IHL	63	41	29	70	114	20	4	11	15	49
1985–86	Sherbrooke Canadiens	AHL	75	25	29	54	42	—	—	—	—	—
1986–87	Sherbrooke Canadiens	AHL	68	22	29	51	64	17	9	8	17	37
1987–88	Sherbrooke Canadiens	AHL	28	12	18	30	61	—	—	—	—	—
1987–88	Montreal Canadiens	NHL	1	1	0	1	0	—	—	—	—	—
1987–88	Pittsburgh Penguins	NHL	30	2	5	7	36	—	—	—	—	—
1988–89	Pittsburgh Penguins	NHL	3	0	0	0	0	—	—	—	—	—
1988–89	Muskegon Lumberjacks	IHL	70	39	34	73	114	14	7	8	15	6
1989–90	Muskegon Lumberjacks	IHL	79	40	45	85	111	14	3	5	8	27
1990–91	Muskegon Lumberjacks	IHL	80	37	38	75	87	5	2	1	3	0
1991–92	Muskegon Lumberjacks	IHL	65	29	20	49	65	14	9	9	18	18
1992–93	Cleveland Lumberjacks	IHL	79	37	37	74	156	3	0	0	0	4
1993–94	Cleveland Lumberjacks	IHL	63	14	17	31	48	—	—	—	—	—
1994–95	Cleveland Lumberjacks	IHL	60	11	17	28	56	—	—	—	—	—
1995–96	Cleveland Lumberjacks	IHL	1	0	0	0	0	—	—	—	—	—
NHL totals			42	3	7	10	36	7	3	1	4	0
