= Massey Place, Saskatoon =

Massey Place
- Neighbourhood
- Interactive map of Massey Place
- Coordinates: 52°08′24″N 106°43′01″W
- Country: Canada
- Province: Saskatchewan
- City: Saskatoon
- Suburban Development Area: Confederation SDA
- Neighbourhood: Massey Place

Government
  - Type: Municipal (Ward 4)
  - Administrative body: Saskatoon City Council
  - Councillor: Troy Davies

Population (2006)
  - Total: 3,510
  - Average Income: $41,971
- Time zone: UTC−6 (UTC)

Massey Place, is a geographically localised subdivision of the Confederation Suburban Development Area in the city of Saskatoon, Saskatchewan which is nestled around Archibald McDonald Park. Mcdonald Park is centrally located along the northern perimeter of 33rd Street East. The school yards of both Vincent Massey School and Bishop Klein School have their western boundaries along Archibald McDonald Park which has as its resources ball diamonds, soccer pitches, winter ice rinks, and playground facilities. Massey Place neighbourhood is close to amenities provided by both the commercial district of the Confederation Urban Centre.

== Demographics ==
Massey Place with a 2001 census population of 3,510 is larger than the provincial town of Tisdale, the "Land of Rape and Honey" which showed a peak population of 3,500. In 2006, the population of Tisdale went down to 2,981 from the 2001 population of 3,063. The population of Massey Place also dropped between 2001 and 1996 from 3,575 to 3,505, however Massey Place neighbourhood had peaked in 1986 at 3,815. Massey Place is also about the same size demographically as Caswell Hill which has a population of 3,505. The family income of both the neighbourhoods of Caswell Hill and Massey Place is approximately the same $40,217 to $41,971 respectively, the average home resale price is about $20,000 higher in Massey Place.

Within the Confederation SDA, the neighbourhood of Massey Place is bounded to the north by 33rd Street East. It is basically triangular in shape. Confederation Drive is to the western limits, the lower tip of the triangle is foreshortened by Milton Street. The eastern limits are Circle Drive.

== Layout ==
The roads are laid out in a court system styling and all the roads begin with the letter "M". The only exception to the rule is Northumberland Avenue.

- Mackie Crescent
- Macklem Drive
- Madison Crescent
- Mahoney Avenue
- Malta Crescent
- Marlborough Avenue, Crescent, Place
- Matheson Drive
- Maxwell Crescent
- McKay Place
- Milton Street
- Moore Place
- Morris Drive

== Government and politics ==
Massey Place exists within the federal electoral district of Saskatoon West. It is currently represented by Brad Redekopp of the Conservative Party of Canada, first elected in 2019.

Provincially, the area is split between the constituencies of Saskatoon Fairview and Saskatoon Westview. The northeastern portion of the neighbourhood falls within Saskatoon Westview and is currently represented by David Buckingham of the Saskatchewan Party, first elected in 2016. The southwestern portion falls within Saskatoon Fairview and is currently represented by Vicki Mowat of the Saskatchewan New Democratic Party, first elected in a 2017 by-election.

In Saskatoon's non-partisan municipal politics, Massey Place lies within ward 4. It is currently represented by Troy Davies, first elected in 2012.

== Education ==
Bishop Klein School
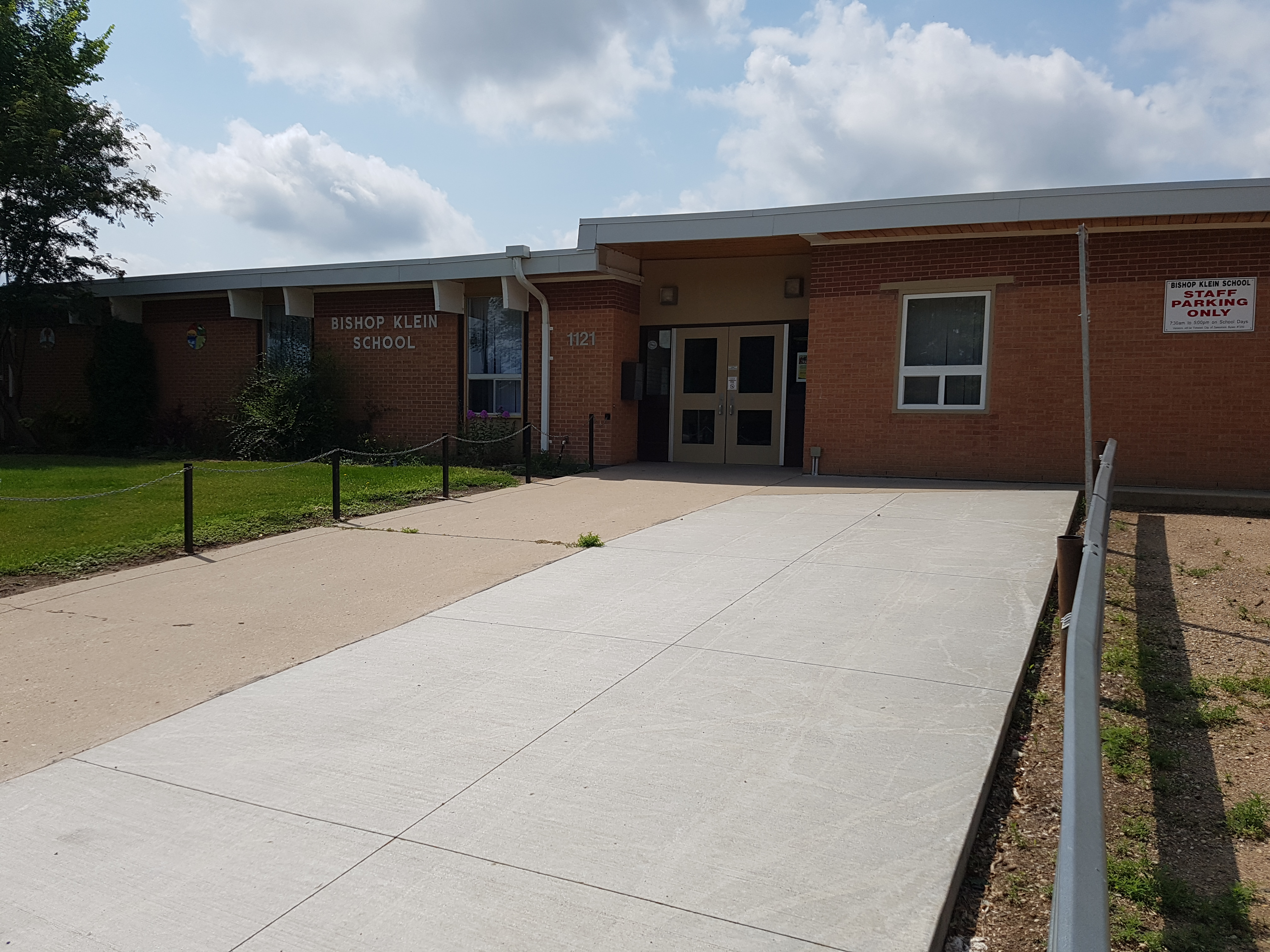
- 1121 Northumberland Avenue; Saskatoon, Saskatchewan, S7L 3X2; Canada

Information
- Type: Elementary
- Religious affiliation: Catholic
- Opened: 1967
- School board: Greater Saskatoon Catholic Schools
- Principal: Burton Harper
- Grades: Pre-Kindergarten to Grade 8
- Enrollment: 229 (2017)
- Education system: Separate
- Language: English
- Feeder to: Bethlehem High School
- Website: Bishop Klein School

Vincent Massey Community School
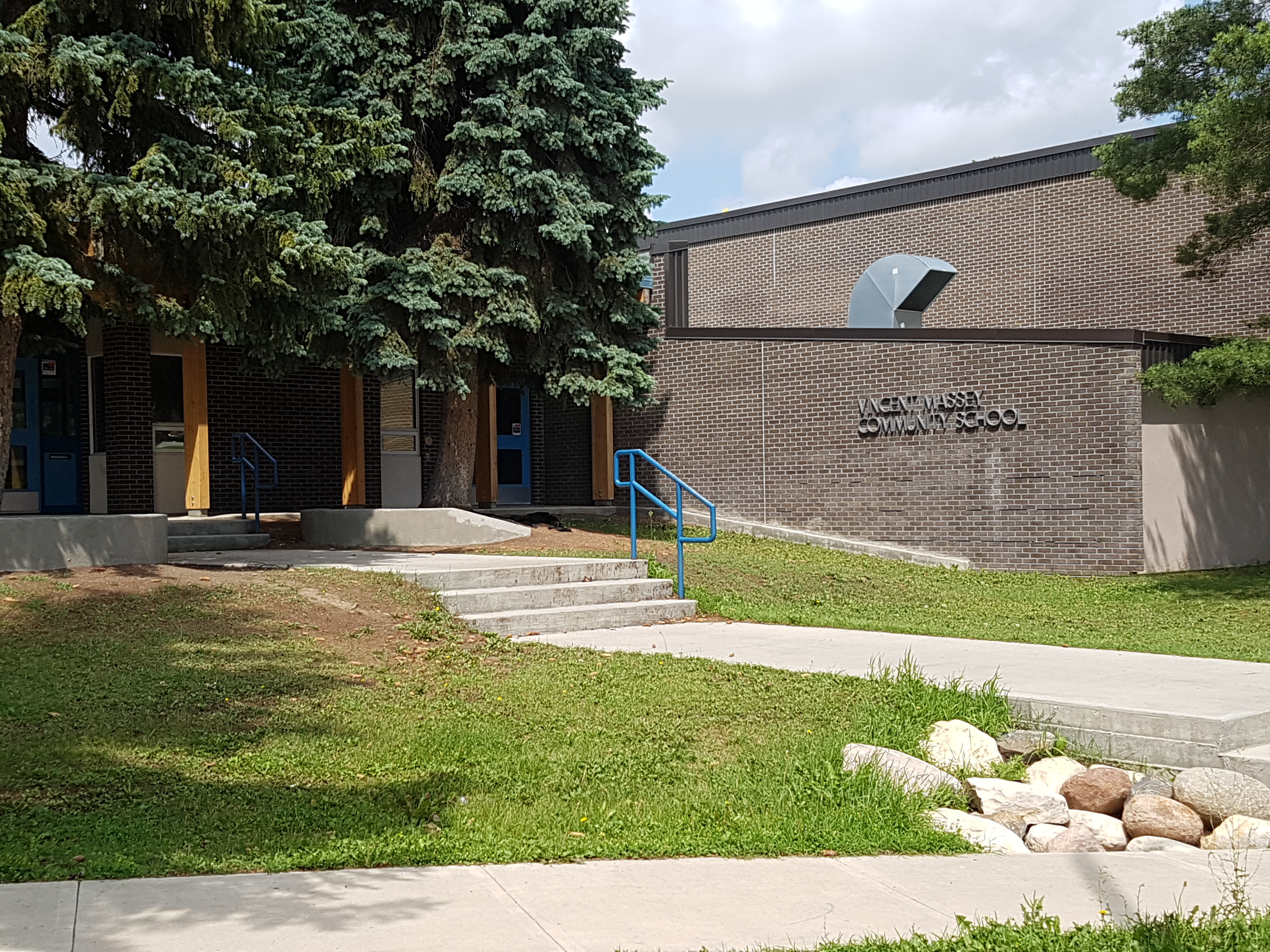
- 1001 Northumberland Avenue; Saskatoon, Saskatchewan, S7L 3W8; Canada

Information
- Type: Elementary
- Opened: 1964
- School board: Saskatoon Public School Division
- Principal: Jody Glines
- Grades: Kindergarten to Grade 8
- Enrollment: 179 (2017)
- Education system: Public
- Feeder to: Mount Royal Collegiate
- Website: Vincent Massey Community School

- Bishop Klein School – Separate Elementary School
- Vincent Massey School – Public Elementary School opened 1964.

== Area Parks ==
- Archibald McDonald Park 13.49 acres (54,600 m^{2})

This park was named after Hudson's Bay Company Chief Factor Archibald McDonald (1790–1853)

- Marlborough Park 1.10 acres (4,500 m^{2})

== Shopping ==
Massey Place has a small strip mall located at the corner of Northumberland Avenue & Morris Drive. The neighbourhood is also near the Confederation Urban Centre and the soon to be finished Blairmore Urban Centre.

=== See also ===
- List of shopping malls in Saskatoon

== History ==
The majority of dwellings were constructed in the 1960s with the construction tapering off in the 1970s. The land for this community was annexed by the city of Saskatoon between 1960 and 1964, and construction began immediately.

== Life ==
Massey Place Community Association is very active, and with its membership base and volunteers promotes a wide variety of leisure activities for the area.
