= Fairhaven, Saskatoon =

Fairhaven
- Neighbourhood
- Interactive map of Fairhaven
- Coordinates: 52.121667°N 106.727778°W
- Country: Canada
- Province: Saskatchewan
- City: Saskatoon
- Suburban Development Area: Confederation SDA
- Neighbourhood: Fairhaven

Government
  - Type: Municipal (Ward 3)
  - Administrative body: Saskatoon City Council
  - Councillor: David Kirton

Population (2005)
  - Total: 4,990
- Time zone: UTC-6 (UTC)

Fairhaven is a neighbourhood in Saskatoon, Saskatchewan, Canada, located towards the west end of the city, south of 22nd Street and west of Circle Drive.

== History ==
Fairhaven first appeared on a 1913 map compiled by City Commissioner Christopher J. Yorath that plotted out a number of proposed communities along the periphery of Saskatoon, many of which were never developed. The community of Fairhaven first officially appeared on city maps circa 1971, in the same location as on the Yorath map, and the layout of streets in the community underwent several revisions before development began in earnest in the mid-1970s, with most construction in the area complete by 1985, however there remained undeveloped lots on the east side of the community that in the early 2010s were filled with the relocation of six-plex homes from the former McNab Park neighbourhood.

Much of the neighbourhood is built on land originally owned by the Pendygrasse family. Sarah Shatwell Pendygrasse arrived from England in 1887 and was awarded a dominion land grant patent at SE section 20 township 36 range 5 W of the 3rd meridian, Saskatchewan provisional district, North West Territories on December 12, 1892. Her son, Harold L. S. Pendygrasse, homesteaded a few miles away at NE Section 20 township 35 Range 3 W of the 3rd meridian. At 1919 St. Henry Avenue, on the east bank of the South Saskatchewan River, the Pendygrasse Home, built by Harold Pendygrasse in 1910, has been declared a municipal heritage site. Pendygrasse Road, one of the community's main access roads, is named in the family's honour.

When Fairhaven first appeared on the maps, the street names all had one thing in common: they all started with the letter F. When the community was re-plotted in the mid-1970s, this was abandoned (except for Fairlight and Fairmont) and most other streets in the area were named for prominent city officials of the past, such as former city councillors S.E. Bushe, E.H. Crimp, G.A. Forrester, J.J. Olmstead, and James Priel. Some of the first development in the community was commercial and office buildings near the junction of 22nd Street and Circle Drive, including the Union Centre, which for many years housed administrative and meeting facilities for local labour union organization.

When the community of Parkridge was first planned to the west of Fairhaven, it was identified on maps as "Fairhaven II" or "Fairhaven West" until a unique name was given to the area. When the City reorganized its community boundaries in the 1990s, a part of Fairhaven north of Fairlight Drive and east of Fairmont Drive (primarily commercial development) became part of the Confederation Urban Centre.

== Government and politics ==
Fairhaven exists within the federal electoral district of Saskatoon West. It is currently represented by Brad Redekopp of the Conservative Party of Canada, first elected in 2019.

Provincially, the area is within the constituency of Saskatoon Riversdale. It is currently represented by Danielle Chartier of the Saskatchewan New Democratic Party, first elected in 2009.

In Saskatoon's non-partisan municipal politics, Fairhaven lies within ward 3. It is currently represented by Ann Iwanchuk, first elected in 2011.

== Education ==
Fairhaven School
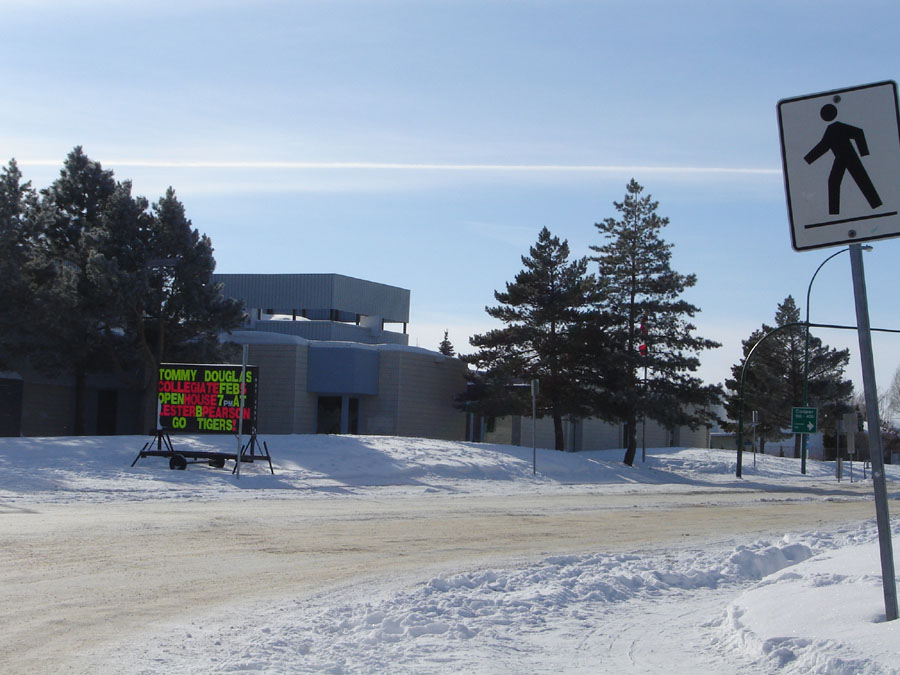

Location
- 495 Forrester Road; Saskatoon, Saskatchewan, S7M 4P7; Canada

Information
- Type: Elementary
- School board: Saskatoon Public School Division
- Principal: Shauna Hilsen
- Grades: Kindergarten to Grade 8
- Enrollment: 317 (2017)
- Education system: Public
- Language: English
- Feeder to: Tommy Douglas Collegiate
- Website: Fairhaven School

St. Mark School
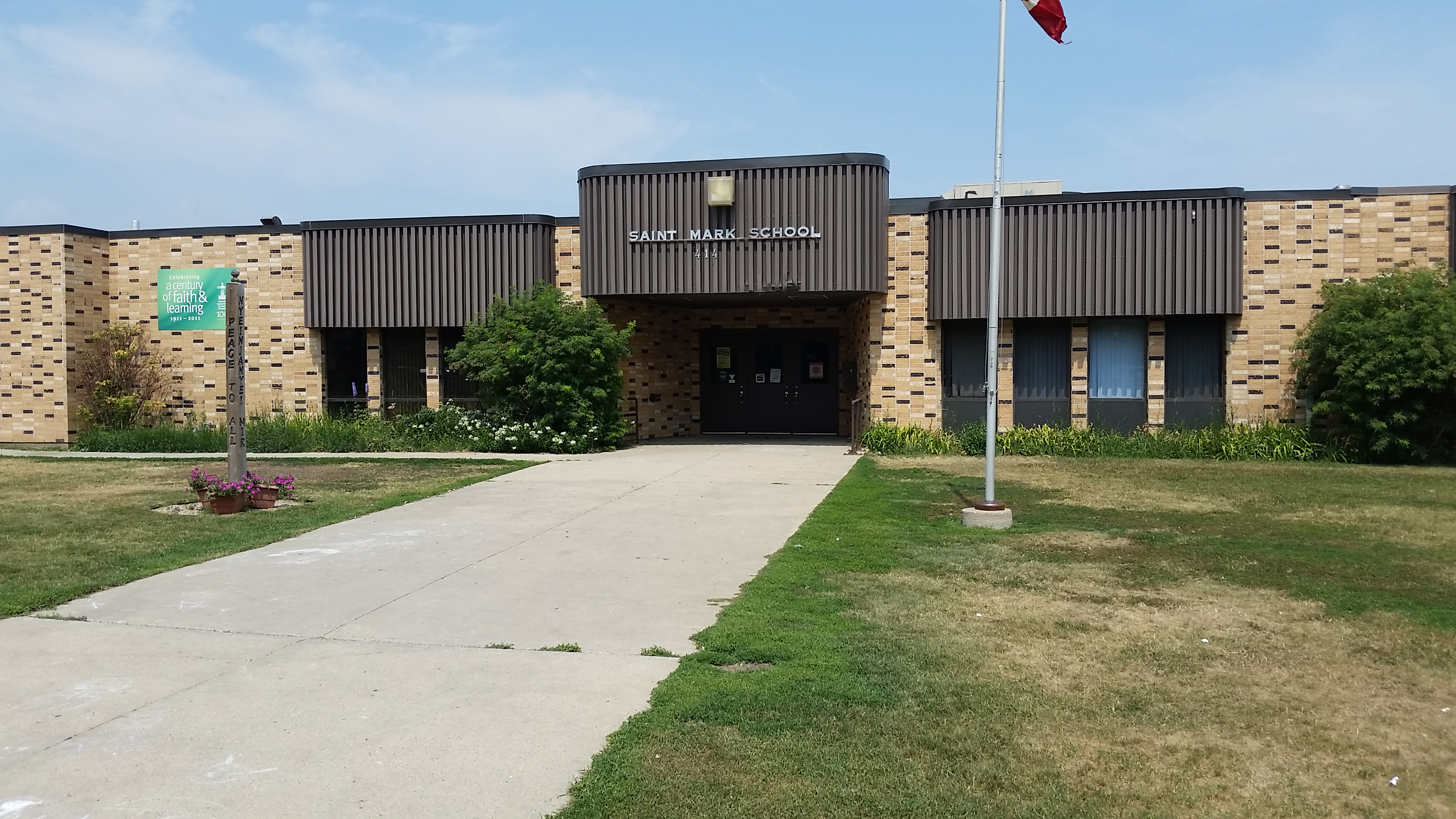

Location
- 414 Pendygrasse Road; Saskatoon, Saskatchewan, S7M 4M3; Canada

Information
- Type: Elementary
- Religious affiliation: Catholic
- Opened: 1977
- School board: Greater Saskatoon Catholic Schools
- Principal: Katrina Sawchuk
- Grades: Pre-Kindergarten to Grade 8
- Enrollment: 373 (2017)
- Education system: Separate
- Language: English
- Feeder to: Bethlehem High School
- Website: St. Mark School

- Fairhaven School - public elementary, part of the Saskatoon Public School Division
- St. Mark School - separate (Catholic) elementary, part of Greater Saskatoon Catholic Schools

== Area parks ==
- Herbert S. Sears Park 20.87 acres. Herbert S. (Bert) Sears (1907-1993) was a mayor of Saskatoon from 1972-76.

== Transportation ==
=== City transit ===
Fairhaven is serviced by the Saskatoon Transit Bus Routes 64 (McCormack/City Centre) and Route 9 (Riversdale/City Centre).

== Layout ==
Fairmont Drive provides the eastern boundary of Fairhaven (residences and businesses to the east of Fairmont are actually within the adjacent Confederation Urban Centre. Fairlight Drive arcs above to the north as well as the western edge. Lochrie Crescent and Barber Place, Terrace, and Court are connected to Pendygrasse road and are included within the southern perimeter of Fairhaven. The Canadian Pacific Railway delimits the southern edge. Prior to the construction of the Circle Drive and 22nd Street interchange, motorists were able to access the Meadowgreen neighbourhood via Clancy Drive through a signalized grade crossing intersection at 18th Street and Circle Drive. When the initial plan called for the interchange having no access to eastbound 22nd Street from southbound Circle Drive, a re-drawing saw the western leg of Camponi Crescent and northbound Fairmont Drive become part of the interchange with access to 18th Street via Clancy Drive ceasing to exist, the signalized grade crossing intersection at Circle Drive and Clancy Drive remains as it was reconfigured to a layout similar to that of the intersection of Circle Drive & Laurier Drive following the closure of 18th Street; southbound traffic on Circle encounters a traffic signal, but northbound traffic is freeflow. However, if an overpass is proposed at Circle & Clancy, 18th Street could possibly be reconnected.

== Life ==
Fairhaven Community Association provides recreational activities at both St. Mark and Fairhaven school, as well as using the common green space between them provided by Herbert S. Sears Park.

== See also ==
- List of shopping malls in Saskatoon
