= Hampton Village, Saskatoon =

Hampton Village
- Neighbourhood
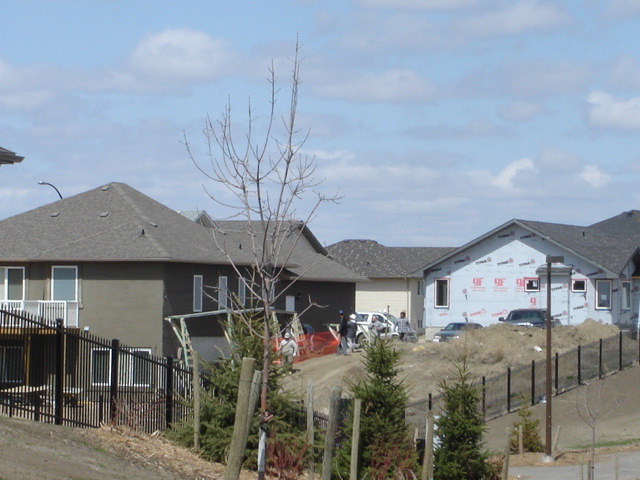
- Interactive map of Hampton Village
- Coordinates: 52°9′18″N 106°43′5″W
- Country: Canada
- Province: Saskatchewan
- City: Saskatoon
- Suburban Development Area: Confederation SDA
- Neighbourhood: Hampton Village

Government
  - Type: Municipal (Ward 4)
  - Administrative body: Saskatoon City Council
  - Councillor: Troy Davies

Population (2019)
  - Total: 8,670
- Time zone: UTC-6 (UTC)
- Website: www.saskhvca.com

Hampton Village is a residential neighbourhood within the Confederation Suburban Development Area of Saskatoon, Saskatchewan. Hampton Village is the first suburb designed on Saskatoon's west side to be modelled after the village concept. The residential area is constructed around the village centre consisting of shops, services and amenities for residential living, with walking trails radiating outward from the central core. This suburb has some detached homes and condominiums sold, and in 2008, there are still several areas still under construction.

The land on which Hampton Village sits was annexed over a period of many years. The western half (west of Junor Avenue) was annexed in July 1979, while the eastern half wasn't annexed until May 2000. Some remnant lots along the southern portion of the community rest on lands annexed by the city between 1911 and 1977.

== Government and politics ==
Hampton Village exists within the federal electoral district of Saskatoon West. It is currently represented by Brad Redekopp of the Conservative Party of Canada, first elected in 2019.

Provincially, the area is within the constituency of Saskatoon Westview. It is currently represented by April ChiefCalf of the Saskatchewan New Democratic Party , first elected in 2024.

In Saskatoon's non-partisan municipal politics, Hampton Village lies within ward 4. It is currently represented by Troy Davies, first elected in 2012.

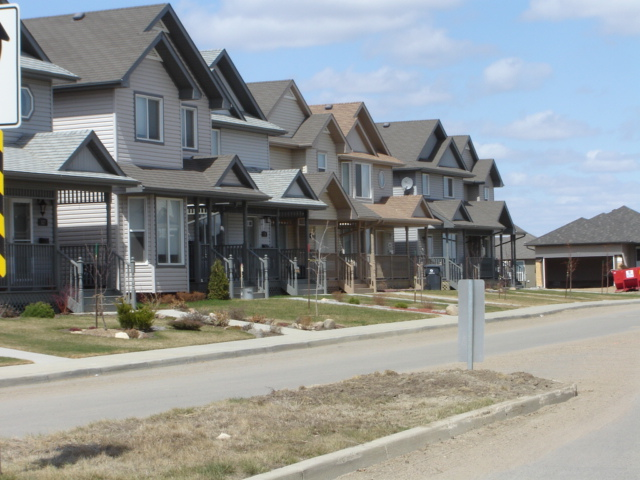
Hampton Village

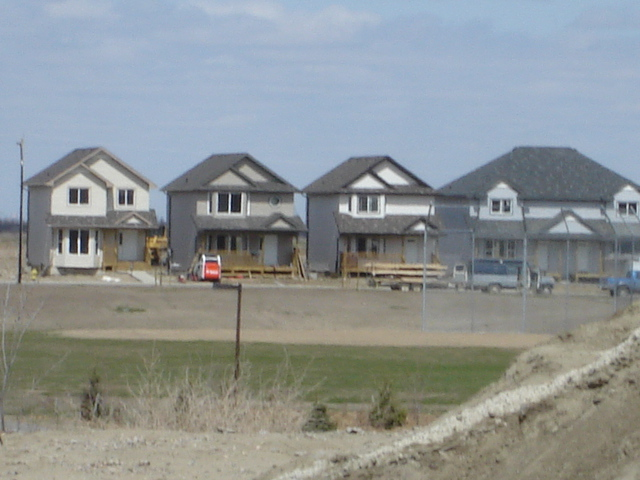
Hampton Village

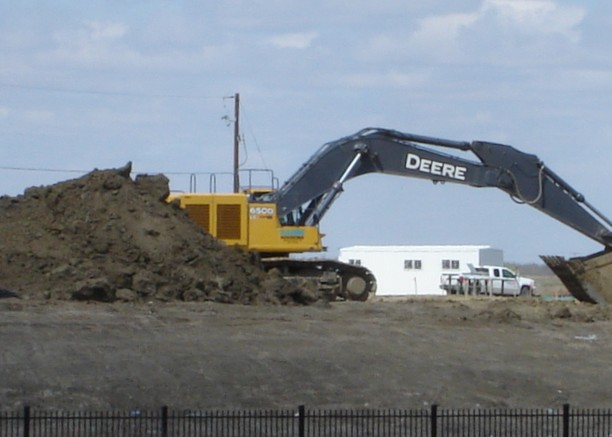
Hampton Village in the midst of construction

== Institutions ==
=== Education ===
Ernest Lindner School
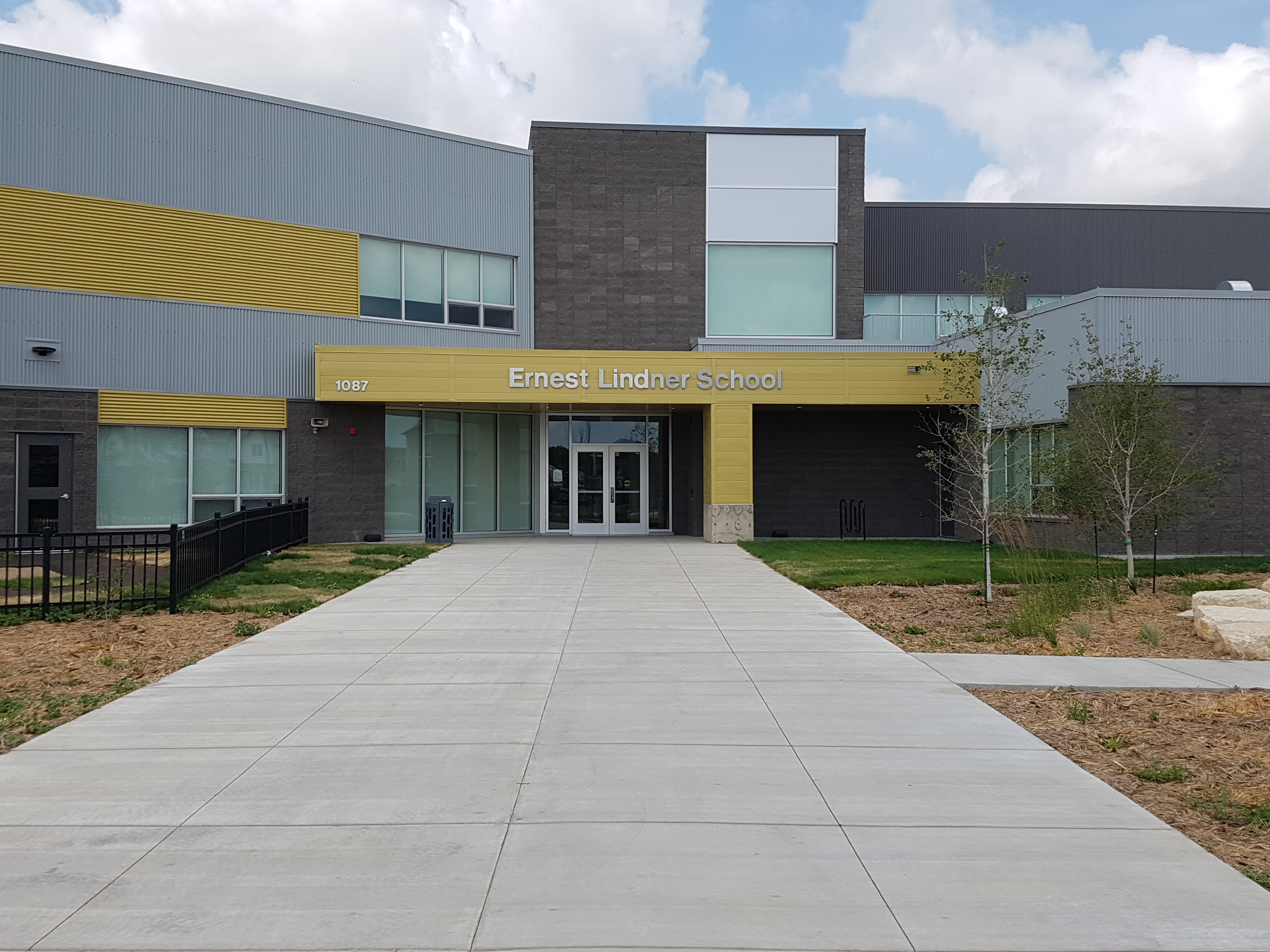
- 1087 Hampton Circle; Saskatoon, Saskatchewan, S7R 0G7; Canada

Information
- Type: Elementary
- Opened: 2017
- School board: Saskatoon Public School Division
- Principal: Todd Berg
- Grades: Kindergarten to Grade 8
- Enrollment: 541 (2017)
- Education system: Public
- Language: English
- Feeder to: Tommy Douglas Collegiate
- Website: Ernest Lindner School

St. Lorenzo Ruiz Catholic School
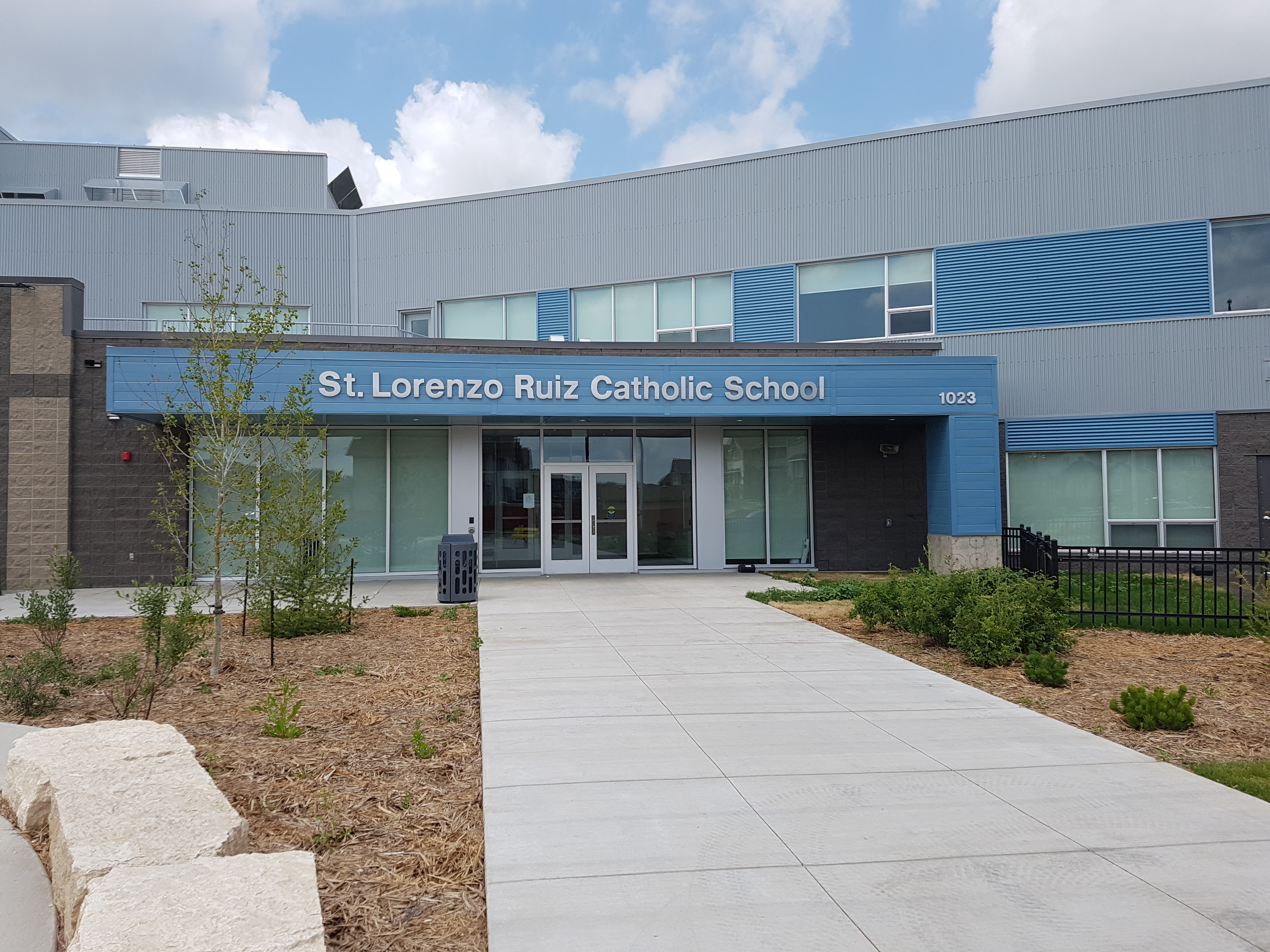
- 1023 Hampton Circle; Saskatoon, Saskatchewan, S7R 0G7; Canada

Information
- Type: Elementary
- Religious affiliation: Catholic
- Opened: 2017
- School board: Greater Saskatoon Catholic Schools
- Principal: Maria Monteiro
- Grades: Kindergarten to Grade 8
- Enrollment: 412 (2017)
- Education system: Separate
- Language: English
- Feeder to: Bethlehem Catholic High School
- Website: St. Lorenzo Ruiz Catholic School

As of September 2017, two elementary schools exist in Hampton Village. On October 22, 2013, the provincial government announced funding for four new P3 facilities in Saskatoon, including a joint-use public/separate school facility in Hampton Village. Greater Saskatoon Catholic Schools revealed in June 2015 that the division's new elementary school in Hampton Village would be named after Lorenzo Ruiz, while Saskatoon Public Schools announced in October 2016 that its new elementary school would be named after Ernest Lindner. Both schools were completed ahead of the 2017–2018 school year.

== Hampton Village Community Garage Sale ==
The Hampton Village Community Association hosts an annual Community-wide Garage Sale and Fundraising BBQ.
