= E. D. Feehan Catholic High School =

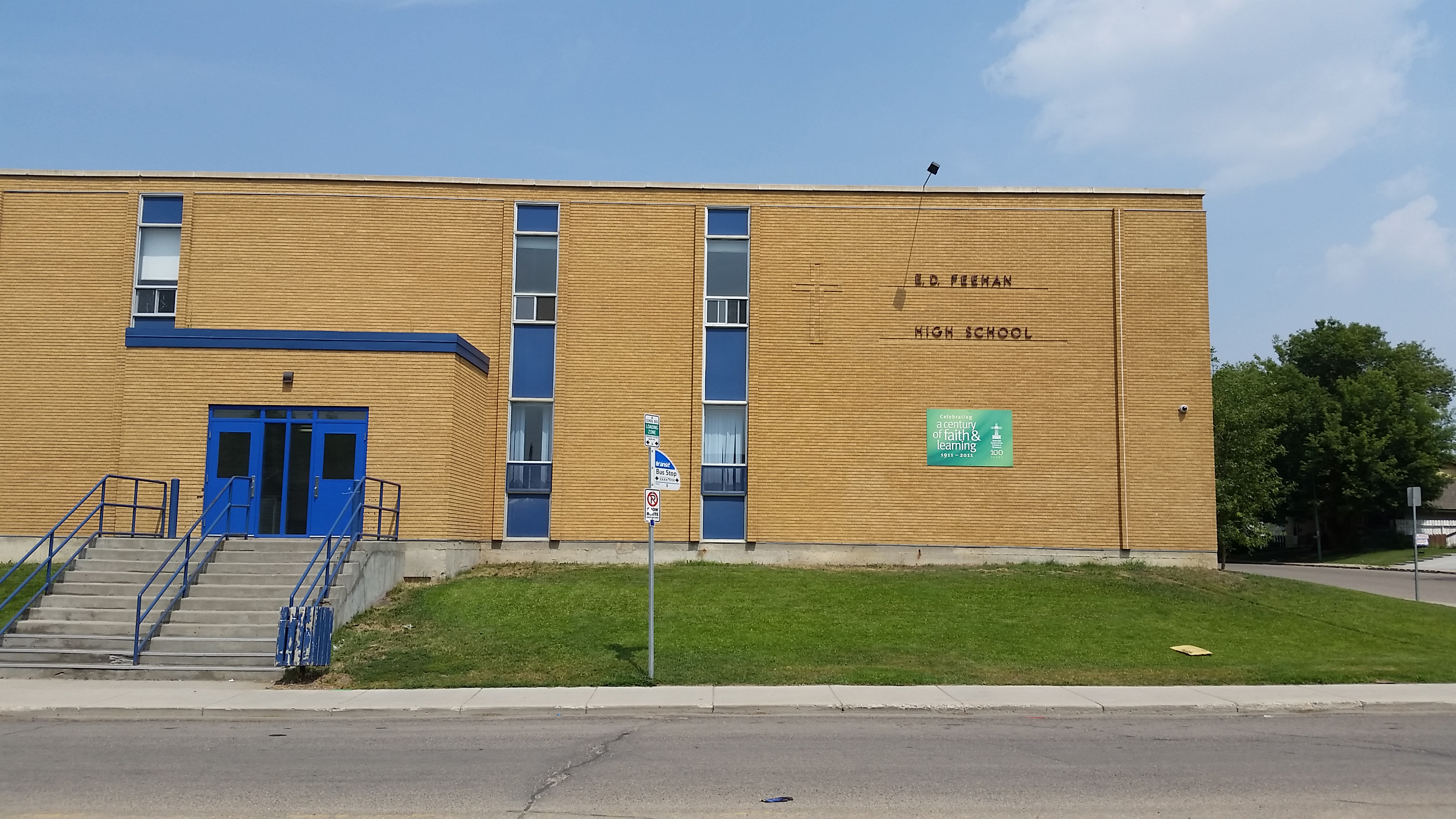

Location
- 411 Avenue M North; Saskatoon, Saskatchewan, S7L 2S7; Canada; 52.133948°N 106.689172°W

Information
- Type: Secondary
- Motto: Freedom, Unity, Charity
- Religious affiliation: Catholic
- Opened: 1967
- School board: Greater Saskatoon Catholic Schools
- Principal: Rayanne Taylor
- Grades: Grade 9 to Grade 12
- Enrollment: 516 (2025)
- Education system: Separate
- Language: English
- Colours: Blue and Gold
- Team name: Trojans, Troys
- Website: E. D. Feehan Catholic High School

E. D. Feehan Catholic High School is a Catholic high school on the west side of Saskatoon, Saskatchewan, Canada, in the neighbourhood known as Westmount. It is operated by Greater Saskatoon Catholic Schools. It was the only Catholic high school on the city's west end until 2008 when Bethlehem High School, located in the Blairmore Urban Centre, opened its doors.

== History ==
The school is named in honour of Edward Daniel Feehan, the first superintendent of education of St. Paul R.C.S.S.D. No. 20 in the city of Saskatoon. He was also the first principal of St. Mary School, the first school in the division.

As of 2019, Feehan is one of only two non-religious figures to have a school in the Saskatoon Catholic school system named after them, the other being Governor General Georges Vanier. All other schools in the system are named for religious leaders, saints, place names, or descriptive terms.

E. D. Feehan offers several courses for students in grades nine to twelve, including standard academic programs, woodworking, cooking, and computer classes. It also provides career pathway opportunities focused on residential home construction and health care. The school is also known for its volunteer work and student support programs.

Its feeder schools include St. Edward School, École St. Gerard School, St. John School, St. Mary's Wellness & Education Centre, St. Maria Goretti Community School, and St. Michael Community School.

The school celebrated its 50th anniversary during the 2017–2018 school year.

== Sports ==
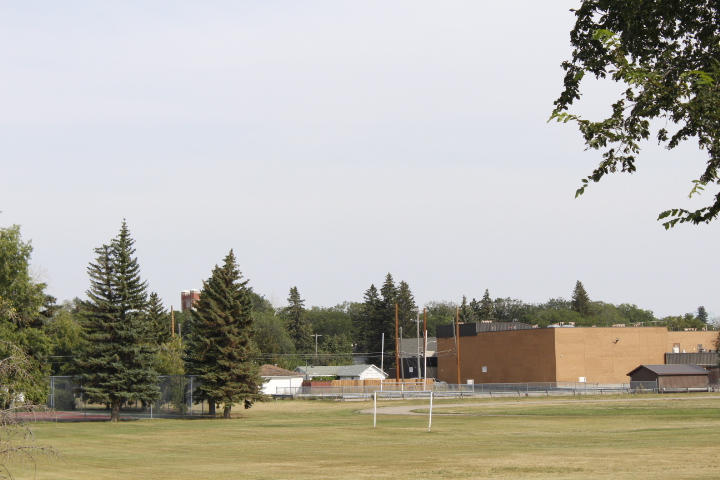
picture of the Scott Park

The school athletic teams are the "Trojans" for the boys and the "Troys" for the girls. The school colours are royal blue and gold.

Sport	Grade	Season
Frosh, Junior and Senior Volleyball	9-12	Sept-Nov
Freshmen, Junior and Senior Basketball	9-12	Nov-March
Junior and Senior Badminton	10-12	March–May
Senior Soccer	9-12	Aug-Nov
Cross Country Running	9-12	Aug-Oct
Wrestling	9-12	Dec-March
Track	9-12	March–May
Girl's and Boy's Curling	9-12	Oct-Mar
Junior and Senior American football	9-12	Sept-Oct

== Programs ==
On top of regular 9-12 classes, ED Feehan offers a variety of alternative education programs to suit the needs of students in the community.

- The miyo mâcihowin Program offers streamlined classes, with additional Indigenous Studies classes. This program focuses on cultural revitalisation for Indigenous and Métis students through land-based learning, spiritual ceremonies, and learning from Elders. This program also offers additional supports for students, such as subsidised bus passes and a nutrition program.
- The English as an Additional Language is for newcomers to Canada who do not have proficiency in the English language. This program places students in regular classes, but they are given additional individualised language-learning instructional activities.
- The Restorative Action Program (RAP) is a program for at-risk students to receive additional socioemotional support as they attend regular classes. This program works in partnership with a community outreach youth program called RAP Saskatoon. They are helped with classes on conflict resolution, interpersonal relationships, coping strategies, and emotional regulation skills.

== Community ==
The school works closely with St. Mary Parish in Saskatoon. The school chaplain is Ryan LeBlanc. In conjunction with the Parish, they do various charity and community outreach events. In 2022, they helped a family of refugees safely relocate to Saskatoon, as well as donating supplies and food and fundraising for their housing. The school also has an annual mandatory Focus on the Family Day, where students volunteer in the community instead of attending regular classes. The school often hosts Special Olympics Saskatoon, and students also volunteer with this event. The school has an on-site child care facility with 47 spaces for children between 0 months and 6 years.

== Notable alumni ==
- Bernie Federko, former NHL player
