= Mount Royal, Saskatoon =

Mount Royal
- Neighbourhood
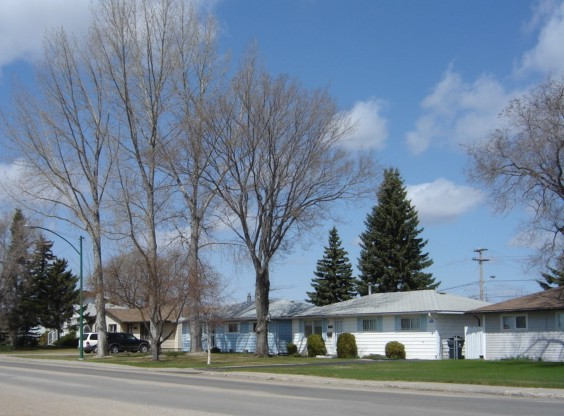
- Mount Royal Streetscape
- Interactive map of Mount Royal
- Coordinates: 52°8′4″N 106°42′13″W
- Country: Canada
- Province: Saskatchewan
- City: Saskatoon
- Suburban Development Area: Confederation SDA
- Neighbourhood: Mount Royal

Government
  - Type: Municipal (Ward 4)
  - Administrative body: Saskatoon City Council
  - Councillor: Troy Davies
- Time zone: UTC-6 (CST)

Mount Royal is a neighbourhood on the westside of Saskatoon, Saskatchewan in the Confederation SDA. As of 2016 if has a population of 5,207 residents. The neighbourhood consists of 3 elementary schools and 2 sister secondary schools.

== Demographics ==
The population in 2016 of the Mount Royal subdivision was 5,207 residents. The families average 2.3 people in size with an average income of $44,120. In 2016 on average 55.3% of the residents here own their own home worth on average $243,453. According to MLS data, the average sale price of a home as of 2013 was $251,065.

== Education ==
Howard Coad School
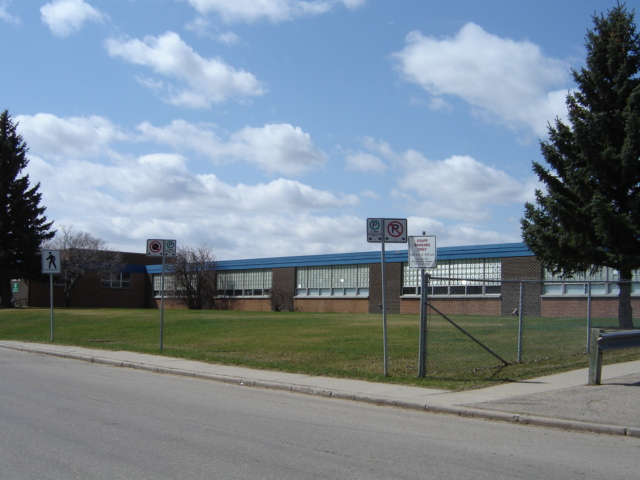

Location
- 431 Avenue T North; Saskatoon, Saskatchewan, S7L 3B5; Canada

Information
- Type: Elementary
- School board: Saskatoon Public School Division
- Principal: Jeff Shepherd
- Grades: Kindergarten to Grade 8
- Enrollment: 230 (2017)
- Education system: Public
- Language: English
- Feeder to: Mount Royal Collegiate
- Website: Howard Coad School

École St. Gerard School
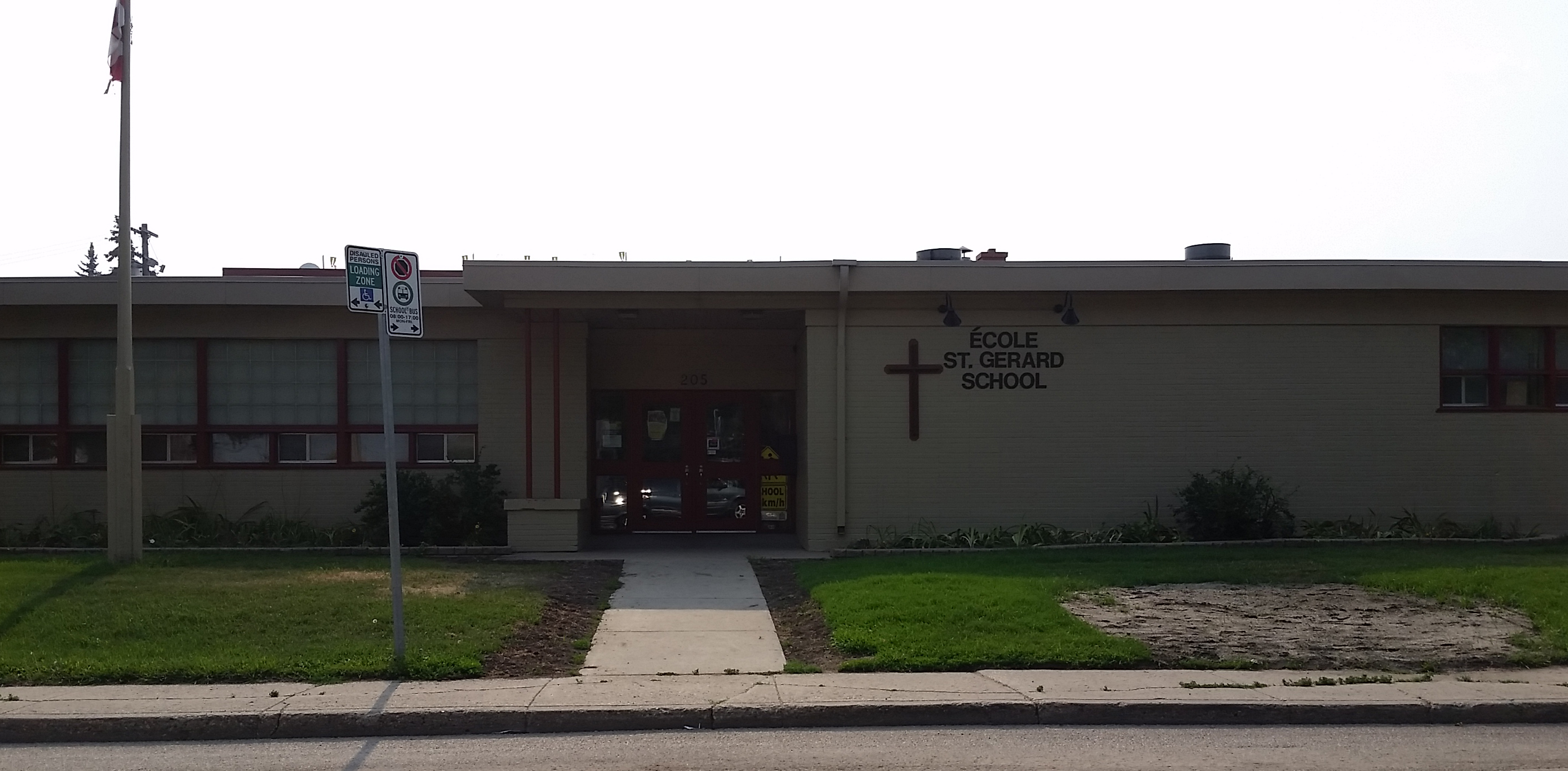

Location
- 205 Montreal Avenue North; Saskatoon, Saskatchewan, S7L 3N6; Canada

Information
- Type: Elementary
- Religious affiliation: Catholic
- Opened: 1959
- School board: Greater Saskatoon Catholic Schools
- Principal: Ted View
- Grades: Kindergarten to Grade 8
- Enrollment: 442 (2017)
- Education system: Separate
- Language: English, French Immersion
- Feeder to: E. D. Feehan High School
- Website: École St. Gerard School

St. Maria Goretti Community School
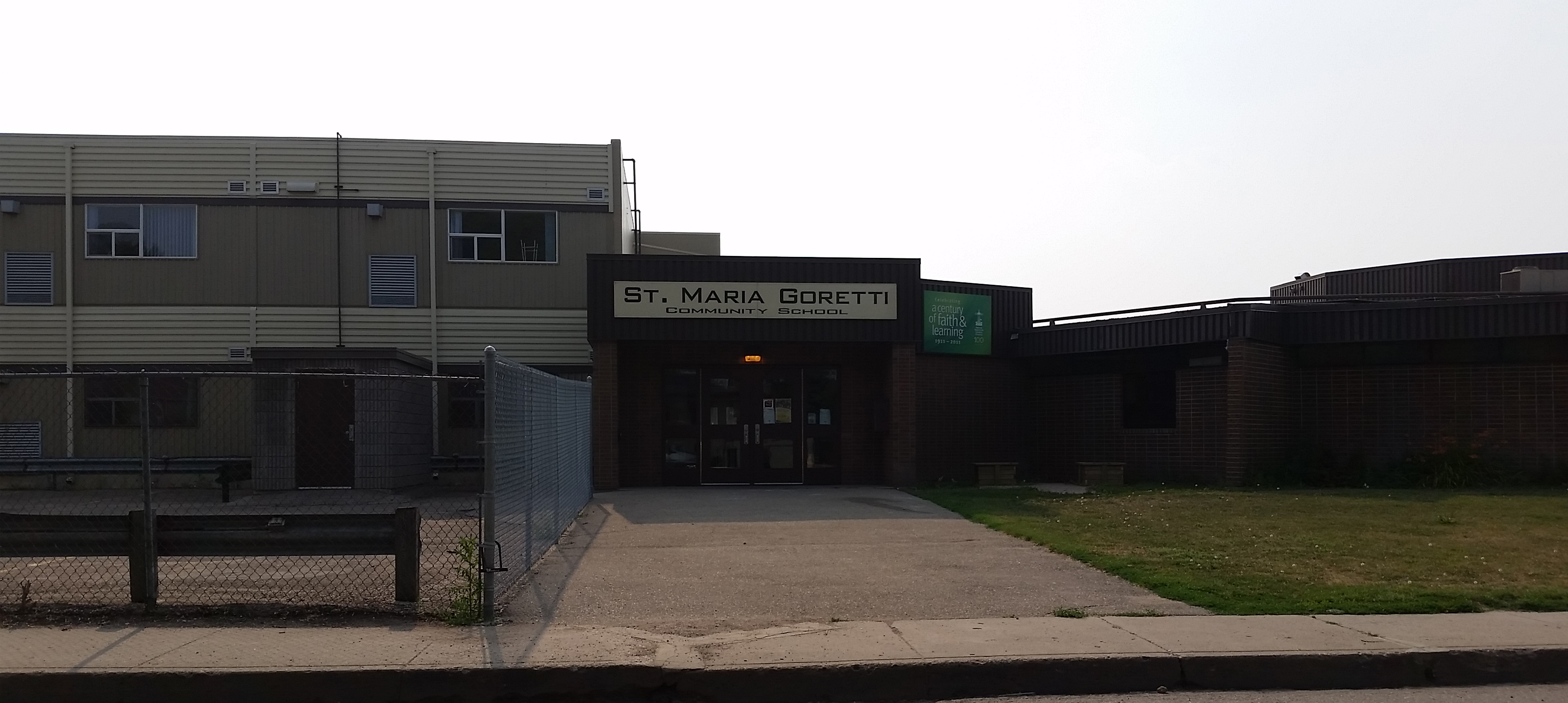

Location
- 301 Avenue Q North; Saskatoon, Saskatchewan, S7L 2X7; Canada

Information
- Type: Elementary
- Religious affiliation: Catholic
- Established: 1954
- School board: Greater Saskatoon Catholic Schools
- Principal: Darcy Todos
- Grades: Pre-Kindergarten to Grade 8
- Enrollment: 149 (2017)
- Education system: Separate
- Language: English
- Feeder to: E. D. Feehan High School
- Website: St. Maria Goretti Community School

- Howard Coad School - public elementary, part of the Saskatoon Public School Division
- Mount Royal Collegiate is a secondary school on Rusholme Road.
- Royal West Campus holds classes at the former Estey elementary school which is located on 441 Witney Avenue North.
- École St. Gerard School - separate (Catholic) elementary, part of Greater Saskatoon Catholic Schools
- St. Maria Goretti Community School - separate (Catholic) elementary, part of Greater Saskatoon Catholic Schools. Originally built in 1954, the school was rebuilt after a fire in 1978.

== Public services ==
Saskatoon light and power provides electrical service to all Saskatoon neighbourhoods which existed after 1958 and lie roughly within the boundaries of Circle Drive. Water is treated and supplied by the City of Saskatoon Water and Wastewater Treatment Branch. There are health professional offices in the central business district, such as physician, dentist, and optometric services. The three Saskatoon hospitals are located in other nearby neighbourhoods. St. Paul's Hospital is located in Pleasant Hill, Royal University Hospital is located in the University of Saskatchewan Land Management area, and Saskatoon City Hospital is located in City Park. The Northwest Division oversees the neighbourhoods on Saskatoon's west side surrounding the Central Division. The Mount Royal subdivision is served by the City of Saskatoon Saskatoon Fire & Protective Services. Saskatoon Transit Route 5 (McCormack/City Center) goes down Rusholme Rd.

== Government and politics ==
Mount Royal exists within the federal electoral district of Saskatoon West. It is currently represented by Brad Redekopp of the Conservative Party of Canada, first elected in 2019.

Provincially, the area is within the constituency of Saskatoon Centre. It is currently represented by Betty Nippi-Albright of the Saskatchewan New Democratic Party who was elected in 2020. This followed the long tenure of David Forbes also of the Saskatchewan New Democratic Party who served as MLA from 2001 to 2020.

In Saskatoon's non-partisan municipal politics, Mount Royal lies within ward 4. It is currently represented by Troy Davies, first elected in 2012.
