= List of shopping malls in Saskatoon =

This is a list of major shopping centres and retail districts in the city of Saskatoon, Saskatchewan, Canada.

== List of enclosed shopping malls in Saskatoon ==
- The Centre – regional mall
- Confederation Mall
- Lawson Heights Mall
- Market Mall
- Midtown Plaza – regional mall

== List of public markets ==
- Saskatoon Farmers' Market

== Large non-enclosed shopping centres ==
Other large non-enclosed shopping centres in Saskatoon include:

- Avalon Shopping Centre strip mall
- Blairmore power centre
- Canarama Centre strip mall
- Circle Centre Mall and Lifestyle center
- College Park Mall strip mall
- Cumberland Square strip mall
- Erindale Centre strip mall
- Grosvenor Park Centre strip mall
- Meadows Market power centre
- Preston Crossing power centre
- River City Centre power centre
- Royal Square strip mall
- Stonegate power centre
- University Heights Square power centre
- Westgate Plaza strip mall

== Other shopping centres and strip malls ==
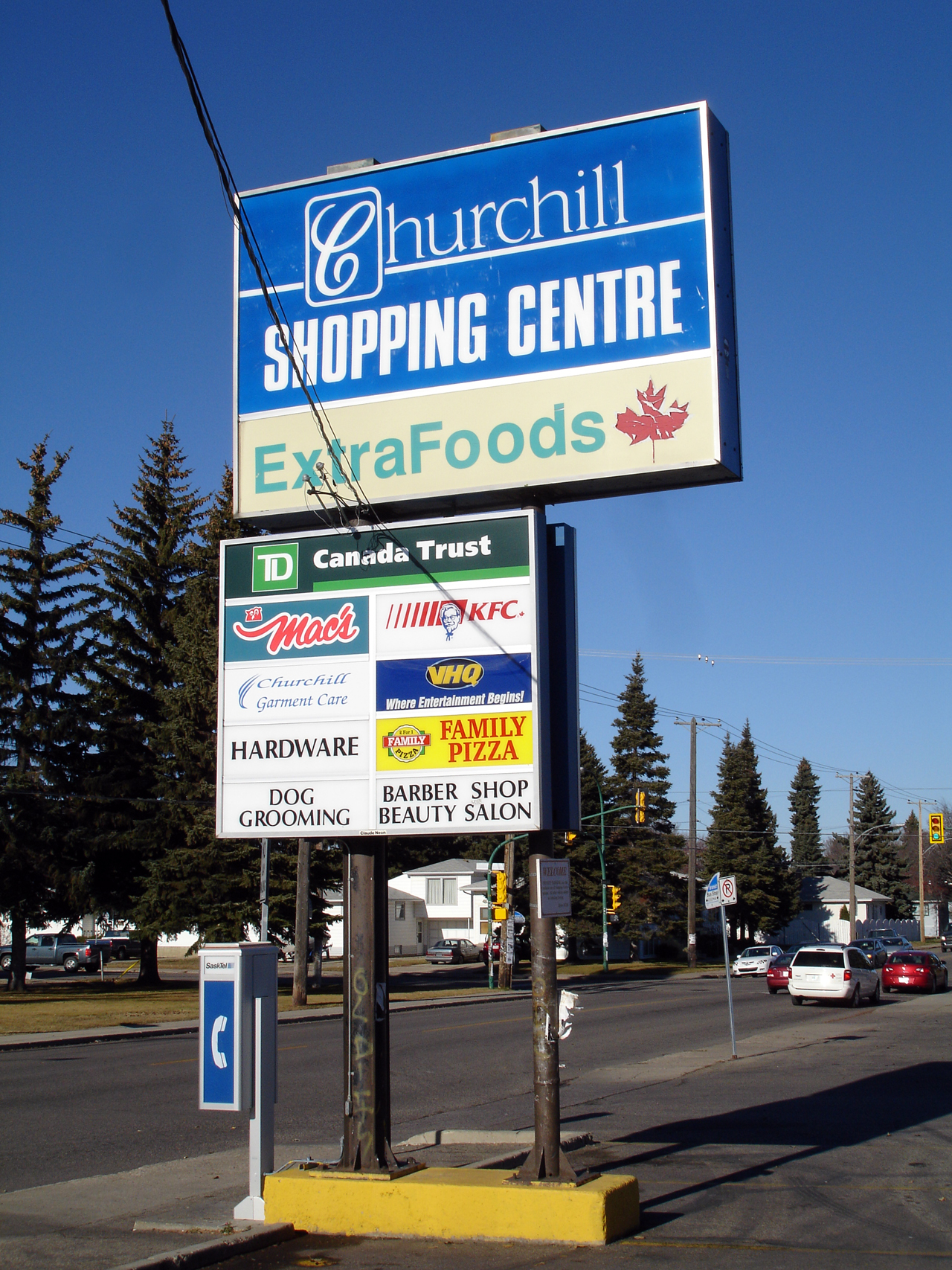
Churchill Shopping Centre

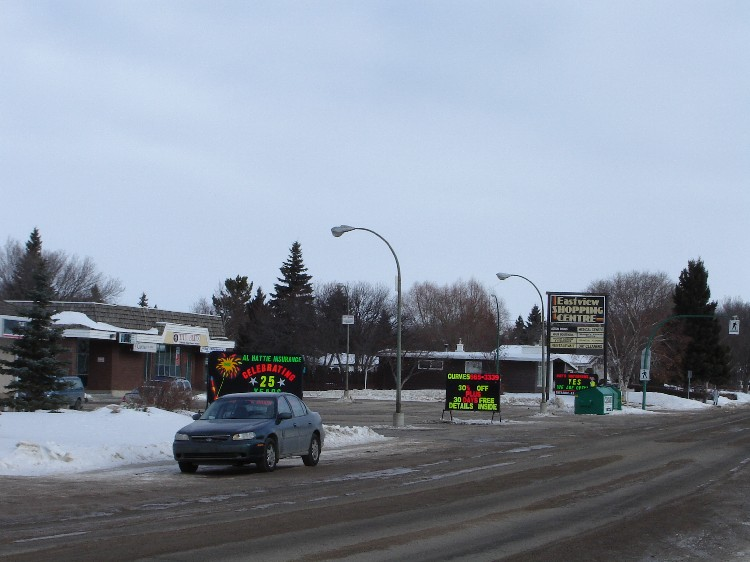
Eastview Shopping Centre

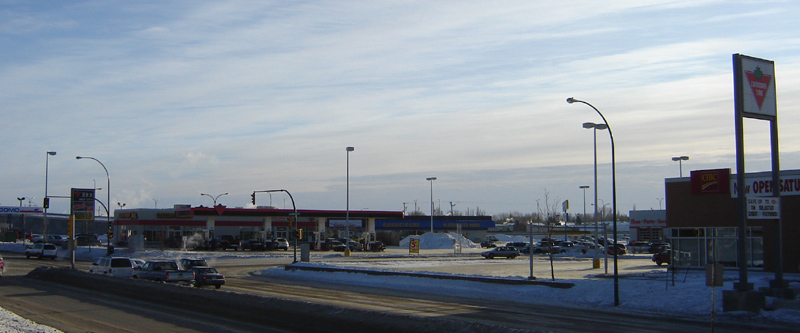
Plaza 22 and Royal Square

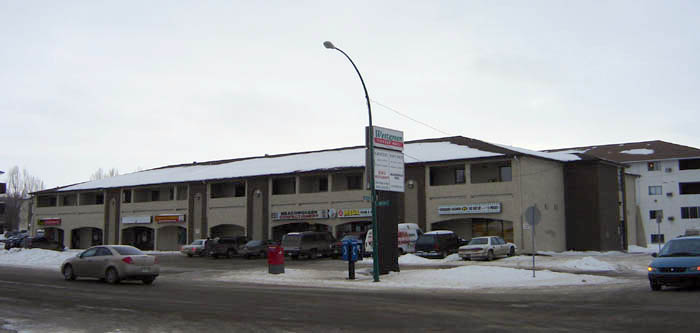
Westgreen Shopping Plaza

There are neighborhood convenience strip malls which are smaller shopping centres located locally in various neighborhoods in Saskatoon. These are too small to merit their own articles.

== Other retail districts ==
- Central Business District (downtown) – the area enclosed by Idylwyld Drive, 25th Street and the South Saskatchewan River
- Broadway Avenue – from 8th Street E to the Broadway Bridge; the original main street of the first Saskatoon townsite, which later came to be known as Nutana
- Central Avenue – from 108th Street to 115th Street; main street of a town which used to be called Sutherland
- Idylwyld Drive – from 33rd Street to Circle Drive
- 8th Street E – from Clarence Avenue to McKercher Drive
- 33rd Street W – from Warman Road to Avenue F
- 22nd Street W – from Avenue P to Circle Drive (although there is also sporadic commercial development between Avenue P and Idylwyld Drive)
- 20th Street W – from Idylwyld Drive to Avenue K; main street of a town which used to be called Riversdale
- 51st Street – from Faithfull Avenue to Millar Avenue

=== Urban centres ===
Saskatoon has established several "urban centres", previously called "suburban centres", in neighbourhoods away from the downtown core, most of which include a major commercial component:

- Blairmore Urban Centre
- Confederation Urban Centre - includes Confederation Mall, Plaza 22 Strip Mall, Canadian Tire, Superstore, and Royal Square Strip Mall
- Lakewood Urban Centre
- Lawson Heights Urban Centre - includes Lawson Heights Mall
- Nutana Urban Centre - includes Market Mall
- University Heights Urban Centre

== See also ==
- List of shopping malls in Canada
