= Mount Royal Collegiate =

Location
- 2220 Rusholme Road; Saskatoon, Saskatchewan, S7L 4A4; Canada; 52.133628°N 106.705300°W

Information
- Type: Secondary
- Motto: Truth, Honour, Wisdom
- Opened: 1960
- School board: Saskatoon Public Schools
- Principal: Scott Ferguson
- Grades: Grade 9 to Grade 12
- Enrollment: 578 (2022)
- Education system: Public
- Language: English
- Colours: Black and Gold
- Team name: Mustangs
- Website: Mount Royal Collegiate

Mount Royal Collegiate (also known as Mount Royal, Royal, or simply MRCI) is located on the west side of Saskatoon, Saskatchewan, Canada in Mount Royal. As part of the Saskatoon Public School system, it serves students from grades 9 through 12.

Currently, its feeder schools are Caroline Robins Community School, Ernest Lindner School, Howard Coad School, Pleasant Hill Community School, Vincent Massey School, Wâhkôhtowin School, and W. P. Bate Community School.

== History ==
Mount Royal first opened its doors in 1960 as one of two Saskatoon west side Public High Schools, the other being Bedford Road Collegiate, which was inaugurated in 1923. Mount Royal was located at the corner of Avenue W and Rusholme Road, where it still stands today. With additions of various labs and classrooms, the school has grown to occupy the entire block on Avenue W from Rusholme Road to 29th Street. Classes are also held in the old Estey Elementary School on Whitney Avenue, where its now called the Royal West Campus. The school originally offered academic studies until 1967, when it opened to skills education such as a Carpentry and Home Economics class.

Today, Mount Royal provides a mix of academic and vocational programming. Some specialized programs offered at Mount Royal include a complete Cosmetology program and the High School Carpentry Apprenticeship Program (HCAP). HCAP students learn how to build homes; in 2017, the HCAP students donated a finished home they built to the Whitecap Dakota First Nation community.

The school also provides courses in "English as an Additional Language" (EAL) for new Canadians, Life Skills Work Study (LSWS) programs and a comprehensive offering of vocational and academic programs which are suitable for learners who have diverse learning needs, styles and requirements.

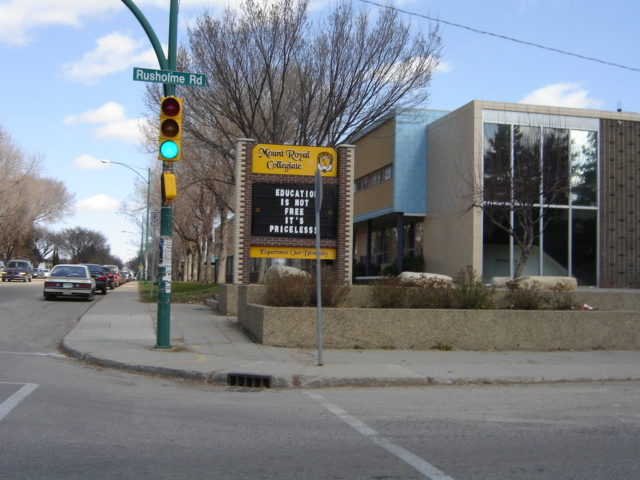
Mount Royal Collegiate on Rusholme

In 2002, the school began offering Restorative Action Program (RAP), a program teaching conflict resolution and leadership skills. It was supported by the Rotary Club of Saskatoon.

A fire in 2016 caused over 10,000 CAD in damages.

In 2020, Mount Royal was the recipient of the Youth Leadership in Action award due to its extended volunteer presence from students in the Alternative Education Work Studies (AEWS). AEWS students additionally care for a community garden and prepare lunch for fellow students experiencing food insecurity.

== Powwow ==
Mount Royal Collegiate hosts an annual powwow to celebrate indigenous heritage of its students and graduation. The first event was in 2000. Over 1500 high school students and elementary schoolers attended the 2015 event.

== Sports ==
The school fields athletic teams known as the Mustangs.

| Sport | Grade | Season |
|---|---|---|
| Junior and Senior Football | 9-12 | Aug-Nov |
| Frosh, Junior and Senior Volleyball | 9-12 | Sept-Nov |
| Freshmen, Junior and Senior Basketball | 9-12 | Nov-March |
| Junior and Senior Badminton | 10-12 | March–May |
| Senior Soccer | 9-12 | Aug-Nov |
| Cross Country Running | 9-12 | Aug-Oct |
| Wrestling | 9-12 | Dec-March |
| Track | 9-12 | March–May |
| Girls' and Boys' Curling | 9-12 | Oct-Mar |

== Royal West Campus ==
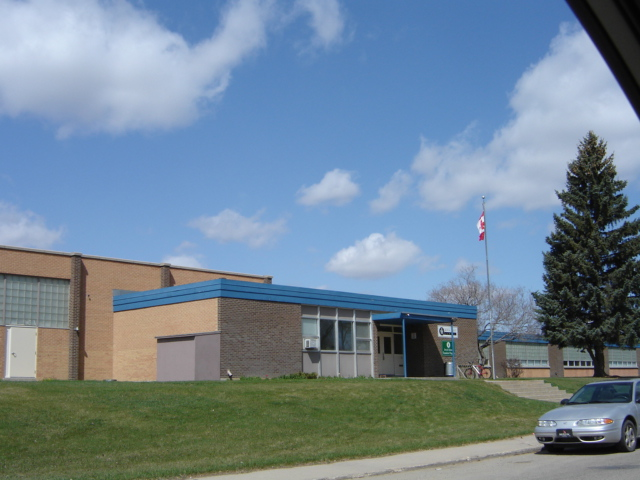
Royal West Campus

Royal West Campus holds classes here at Mount Royal Collegiate.

== Notable alumni ==
- Shannon Tweed, actress and model
- Perry Ganchar, hockey player
- Michael Linklater, basketball player
- Michael Eklund, actor
- Troy Davies, Saskatoon City Councillor
