= Linc =

Linc, The Linc or LINC may refer to:

== Science ==
- LINC, Laboratory Instrument Computer, MIT and DEC, 1962
- LINC 4GL, a programming language
- LINC complex, a protein complex of the cytoskeleton
- LINC complex, or simply LINC, another name for the DREAM complex

== Organizations ==
- MIT LINC, Learning International Networks Consortium of the Massachusetts Institute of Technology
- Linc Energy, an Australian energy company
- LINC TV, a community television station based in Lismore, New South Wales, from 1993 to 2012
- Lesbians in Cork, formerly LINC

== Other ==
- Linc (name), a list of people and fictional characters
- Language Instruction for Newcomers to Canada, Canadian federal government language education programme
- ASF LINC, Loan Identification Number Code of the American Securitization Forum
- Lincoln M. Alexander Parkway, expressway in Hamilton, Ontario, Canada
- Lincoln Financial Field, the home stadium of the Philadelphia Eagles
- LINC (Learning Innovation Centre), Edge Hill University, Lancashire, England
- LINC, the computer controlling Union City in Beneath a Steel Sky
- LINC, reporting mark of the Lewis and Clark Railway, Clark County, Washington, United States

== See also ==
- Linc's, an American television series from 1998 to 2000
- Lincs Wind Farm, off the east coast of England
- Lincs FM, former name for a UK Independent Local Radio radio station serving Lincolnshire and Newark, now called Hits Radio Lincolnshire
- Library Information Network of Clackamas County (LINCC)
- lincRNA, large intergenic non-coding RNA
- Lincs (disambiguation)
- Link (disambiguation)
- Linq (disambiguation)
