= Link =

Link or Links may refer to:

== Places ==
- Link, West Virginia, an unincorporated community in the US
- Link River, Klamath Falls, Oregon, US

== People with the name ==
- Link (singer) (Lincoln Browder, born 1964), American R&B singer
- Link (surname)
- Charles Lincoln "Link" Neal III of Rhett & Link (born 1978), American comedian and YouTuber
- Link Wray (1929–2005), American rock-and-roll guitarist

== Science and technology ==
=== Computing ===
- Hyperlink, from one electronic document to another
- link (Unix), a command-line program to link directory entries
- <link>, a type of HTML element
- Link, in a linked list
- Linker (computing), a program which converts object files to an executable
- Links (web browser)
- Microsoft Office Assistant Links, an animated cat
- Link layer in computer networking
- ln (Unix), a command-line program to create a link to a file

=== Mathematics ===
- Simplicial link, a set of simplices "surrounding" a given vertex in a simplicial complex
- Link (knot theory), a collection of knots entangled with one another
- Link function in statistics

=== Mechanical devices ===
- Link, a single element of a chain
- Link-and-pin coupler
- Link Trainer, a series of flight simulators produced from 1930s to 1950s

=== Other uses in science and technology ===
- Link (Mars), a rock outcrop
- Link or linking col, used in determining topographic prominence
- Telecommunications link, communication channel between two or more devices
- LINK, a spacecraft used in the Swift rescue mission
- Linking (linguistics), linking of sounds in connected speech

== Arts, entertainment, and media ==
=== Fictional characters ===
- Link (The Legend of Zelda), in The Legend of Zelda videogame series
- Link (The Matrix), in Matrix media
- Link, in the 1993 novel Stone Cold
- Link (Linkovitch Chomofsky), in the 1992 film Encino Man
- Link Hogthrob, in The Muppets
- Lancelot Link, chimpanzee, title character of Lancelot Link, Secret Chimp television series
- Link Larkin, in the musical Hairspray

=== Games ===
- Links (series), computer-simulated golf game by Access Software
- Pokémon Trozei!, a 2005 puzzle game for the Nintendo DS, named Pokémon Link in PAL regions

=== Music ===
- The Link (album), by French death metal band Gojira
- Links (Kerfuffle album), 2006, by English folk band Kerfuffle
- Links (Mark Murphy album), a 2001 album by Mark Murphy
- "Link", a 2005 song by L'Arc-en-Ciel
- "Link", a 2007 song by Porno Graffitti
- "Links", a 2023 song by Indo-Canadian rapper Sukha

=== Periodicals ===
- Links (magazine), a US golf magazine
- The Link (newspaper), a student newspaper at Concordia University, Canada
- The Link, the newsletter of the organization Americans for Middle East Understanding

=== Television ===
- Link TV, US network
- The Link (game show), UK, 2014–2015
- The Link (TV program), US, 2011 documentary
- The Link, a TV series by aptn Kids, Canada
- Link: Eat, Love, Kill, a 2022 South Korean television series

=== Other uses in arts, entertainment, and media ===
- Link (film), a 1986 horror movie featuring a super-intelligent, murderous orangutan
- WBT-FM, a radio station in Charlotte, North Carolina, US, that used call sign WLNK 1997–2025

== Finance ==
- Chainlink (blockchain), a cryptocurrency
- Link, an Internet wallet service from Stripe, Inc.
- Link (Indonesia), an interbank network
- LINK (UK), a cash machine network

== Organizations and programs ==
=== Businesses ===
- Air Link, New South Wales, Australia
- Hong Kong Link, toll tunnels and bridges company
- Link REIT, Hong Kong real estate investment trust
- The Link (retailer), UK mobile phone retailer
- Link Aviation Devices, a manufacturer of aircraft simulator, now a subsidiary of L3 Technologies

=== Other organizations and programs ===
- HOL LiNK program (Literacy and Numeracy Knowledge), by Hands On Learning Australia
- Liberty in North Korea (LiNK), a refugee resettling group
- Link Campus University, Rome, Italy
- LINKS units, later student volunteering units, of St John Ambulance in England and Wales
- Local involvement networks (LINks), National Health Service England
- Project LINK, a UN project to build global macroeconomic models
- The Link (UK organization) for "Anglo-German friendship", UK pro-Nazi organization, 1937–1939
- The Links, a social and service organization of American Black women

== Transportation systems ==
- Link (Rochester), an under-construction BRT line in Rochester, Minnesota, US
- Link (Saskatoon), an under-construction BRT in Canada
- Link light rail, operated by Sound Transit, in the region of Seattle, Washington, US
- Terminal Link, Toronto Airport, Canada
- San Leandro LINKS, a bus service in California, US
- Link bus services, a service in Auckland, New Zealand

== Other uses ==
- Link (unit), surveying length unit
- Link, a single sausage in a string
- Links (golf), a coastal golf course
- The Link (building), a skyscraper in France
- The Links, the mascot of Lincoln High School (Lincoln, Nebraska)

== See also ==
- Linc (disambiguation)
- Lincs (disambiguation)
- Linker (disambiguation)
- Linq (disambiguation)
- Linx (disambiguation)
- Lync, a 1990s post-hardcore band
- Skype for Business, formerly Microsoft Lync
- Lynx (disambiguation)
- Linkt, road tolling brand in Australia
