= Lynx bus =

Lynx (bus) may refer to:

- Leyland Lynx - bus manufactured by Leyland between 1986 and 1992
- Lynx (bus company) - bus operator in King's Lynn, England
- Lynx (Orlando) - public bus system in Orlando, Florida
- Lynx (Denver) - bus rapid transit system in Denver, Colorado

== See also ==
- Lynx (disambiguation)
