= Linx =

Linx or LINX may refer to:

- Linx Cargo Care Group, Australian logistics company
- Linx (railway company), a now defunct Norwegian-Swedish railway company
- Linx (software house), a Brazilian business management software company
- LINX (IPC), an inter process communication mechanism developed by ENEA R&D
- Linx (band), a British band that had several UK Top 40 hits during the early 1980s
- London Internet Exchange (or LINX), an internet exchange point in London
- LINX, a medical device for treatment of acid reflux
- Simcoe County LINX, an intercommunity regional bus service in Simcoe County, Ontario, Canada
- Sontaran Commander Linx, a fictional character appearing in the Doctor Who sci-fi episode "The Time Warrior"

== People ==
- David Linx (born 1965), Belgian jazz singer, composer, and songwriter

== See also ==
- Link (disambiguation)
- Lynx (disambiguation)
