= Lynx (disambiguation) =

A lynx is a type of wild cat.

Lynx may also refer to:

== Arts and media ==
=== Gaming ===
- Lynx (video game console), a handheld gaming console by Atari
- Lynx (Chrono Cross), a character from the video game Chrono Cross
- Lynx, a playable character from the gacha game Honkai: Star Rail
- Lynx, a character and cosmetic from Fortnite: Battle Royale

=== Other media ===
- Lynx (comics), three fictional characters in the DC Comics universe
- Lynx (magazine), a Japanese literary magazine published by Gentosha Comics every other month

== Astronomy ==
- Lynx (constellation)
- Lynx (Chinese astronomy)
- Lynx X-ray Observatory, a mission concept for a next-generation X-ray space observatory

== Businesses and brands ==
- Lynx Express (parcels) (or simply Lynx), a UK parcel carrier, now owned by UPS
- Lynx Software Technologies, an American software company
- Lynx Rifles, a Finnish manufacturer of handmade straight pull rifles
- Yashica Lynx, a family of rangefinder cameras from the 1960s
- Lynx (grooming product), a brand of deodorant known as Axe in some markets
- Lynx, a brand of footwear owned by Colorado Group

== Computing ==
- Lynx (protocol), a protocol for efficient transfer of files over modems
- Lynx (web browser), a text-based web browser commonly used on Unix workstations
- Lynx (programming language), a programming language for large distributed networks
- Lynx Point, an Intel chipset
- LynxOS, an operating system
- Camputers Lynx, a British computer
- Lynx, a family of HP AlphaServers

== People ==
- Lynx Vaughan Gaede (born 1992), half of the American white nationalist folk teen duo Prussian Blue
- The Lynx gang, a violent criminal gang based in Birmingham, UK
- The Lynxes, a popular name for members of the Accademia dei Lincei, the first scientific society

== Places ==
=== Canada ===
- Lynx, Ontario, an unincorporated place and railway point
- Lynx Mountain, in the Canadian Rockies
- Lynx Lake (Northwest Territories)
- Lynx Formation, a stratigraphical unit in western Canada

=== United States ===
- Lynx, Ohio, a census-designated place
- Lynx Lake (Arizona), a reservoir
- Lynx Peak, a mountain in Alaska

=== Antarctica ===
- Lynx Rocks, South Shetland Islands

== Military ==
=== Land vehicles ===
- Lynx reconnaissance vehicle, used by the armed forces of Canada and the Netherlands
- Panhard AML-90 Lynx, a variant of the lightweight French AML-90 armoured car
- Pansarbil m/39 Lynx, a Swedish armoured car used by the Swedish and Danish armies
- Lynx Scout Car, a Canadian–built version of the World War II Daimler Dingo
- Lynx, a version of the ERC 90 Sagaie, a French six wheeled fire-support and reconnaissance vehicle
- Lynx ATV, a family of 4x4, 6x6, and 8x8 wheeled all-terrain vehicle developed in China
- Lynx (Rheinmetall armoured fighting vehicle), a family of tracked armored vehicles developed by Rheinmetall Landsysteme
- Luchs (tank), a version of the German Panzer II during WWII

=== Maritime vessels ===
- HMS Lynx, nine British Royal Navy ships
- Lynx, an American schooner captured by the Royal Navy in 1813 and renamed HMS Mosquidobit (1813)
- USS Lynx, several US Navy ships
- USS Lynx II (SP-730), a US Navy patrol vessel in commission from 1917 to 1919
- French destroyer Lynx, scuttled in 1942 to avoid capture by the Germans
- French corvette Lynx (1804)

=== Other military uses ===
- Finnish 5th Division (Continuation War) or Lynx Division, a unit of the Finnish Army
- Lynx, the name of military versions of the Cessna Skymaster, flown by the Rhodesian Air Force
- Westland Lynx, a British military helicopter manufactured by AgustaWestland
- LYNX (multiple rocket launcher), a multiple rocket launcher manufactured by Israel Military Industries

== Transport ==
=== Vehicles and engines ===
- Leyland Lynx, a model of single-decker bus produced by British Leyland in the 1980s and 1990s
- Mercury Lynx, a model of car
- Mitsubishi Lynx, a 1993 Mitsubishi Motors concept car
- GWR no. 2109 Lynx, a South Devon Railway Eagle class steam locomotive
- Lynx (tall ship), an interpretation of the 1812 privateer schooner, launched in 2001
- Lynx (snowmobile), a brand of snowmobiles
- XCOR Lynx, a proposed rocket-powered spaceplane
- AA-1C Lynx, part of the Grumman American AA-1 series of light aircraft
- Armstrong Siddeley Lynx, an early aircraft engine

=== Companies and services ===
- Lynx (bus company), a bus company based in King's Lynn, Norfolk
- Lynx (Orlando), a bus system operated by the Central Florida Regional Transportation Authority
- Lynx Air, a defunct Canadian low cost carrier airline
- Lynx Air International, an American airline
- Lynx Aviation, an American regional airline from 2006 to 2011
- Lynx Rapid Transit Services, the public transit system in Charlotte, North Carolina
- Lynx Express, a former long-distance passenger train and fast ferry service in the South Island of New Zealand
- Lynx, an express bus line operated by WestCAT between San Francisco and Hercules, California
- LYNX (Denver), an under-construction bus rapid transit system in Denver

== Sports ==
=== Ice hockey ===
- Lynx du Collège Édouard-Montpetit women's ice hockey, a Quebec, Canada college hockey team
- Augusta Lynx, a minor league professional ice hockey team in Augusta, Georgia
- Saint-Jean Lynx, a defunct Quebec Major Junior Hockey League team
- The Lynx, another name for the Slovenia men's national ice hockey team

=== Soccer ===
- Toronto Lynx, a USL First Division soccer team
- Adirondack Lynx, an American women's soccer team
- Tampere Lynx (Tampereen Ilves), a Finnish soccer team
- Toronto Lady Lynx, a Canadian women's soccer team

=== Other sports ===
- Minnesota Lynx, a WNBA basketball team
- Ottawa Lynx, a former AAA minor league baseball team
- Perth Lynx, an Australian professional women's basketball team
- Lynx (orienteering), a Finnish orienteering club
- Lynx, name of the athletic teams and mascot of Lesley University, a private university in Massachusetts
- The Lynx, mascot for Rhodes College, a private college in Memphis, Tennessee
- Lynx, mascot of Lindenwood University – Belleville, Illinois

== Other uses ==
- Lynx (mythology), in various mythologies

== See also ==
- Luchs (disambiguation), German term for lynx
- Linx (disambiguation)
- Link (disambiguation)
- Lince (disambiguation)
- Lync, an American band
