= Linc (name) =

Masculine given name

Linc is a masculine given name, usually a shortened version (hypocorism) of Lincoln. It may refer to:

People:

- Lincoln Alexander (1922–2012), first black Canadian Member of Parliament, first black federal cabinet minister and Lieutenant Governor of Ontario
- Lincoln Linc Blakely (1912–1976), American Major League Baseball player in 1934
- Lionel Linc Chamberland (1940–1987), American jazz guitarist
- Linc Darner (born 1970), American college basketball head coach
- Lincoln D. Faurer (1928–2014), US Air Force lieutenant general, director of the National Security Agency and Chief of the Central Security Service
- Henry Lincoln Johnson (1870–1925), African-American attorney and politician
- Gudjon Lincoln Linc Johnson (1899–1970), Canadian curler

Fictional characters:

- Lincoln Case, one of the main characters on the 1950s television series Route 66
- Linc Hayes, one of the main character on the 1960s and '70s television series The Mod Squad
- Linc McCray, one of the main characters of the 1971 television series The Chicago Teddy Bears, played by Dean Jones

== See also ==
- Fred Lincoln Link Wray (1920-2005), American rock and roll guitarist, songwriter and vocalist
