= Downtown Saskatoon bus terminal =

City Centre bus terminal
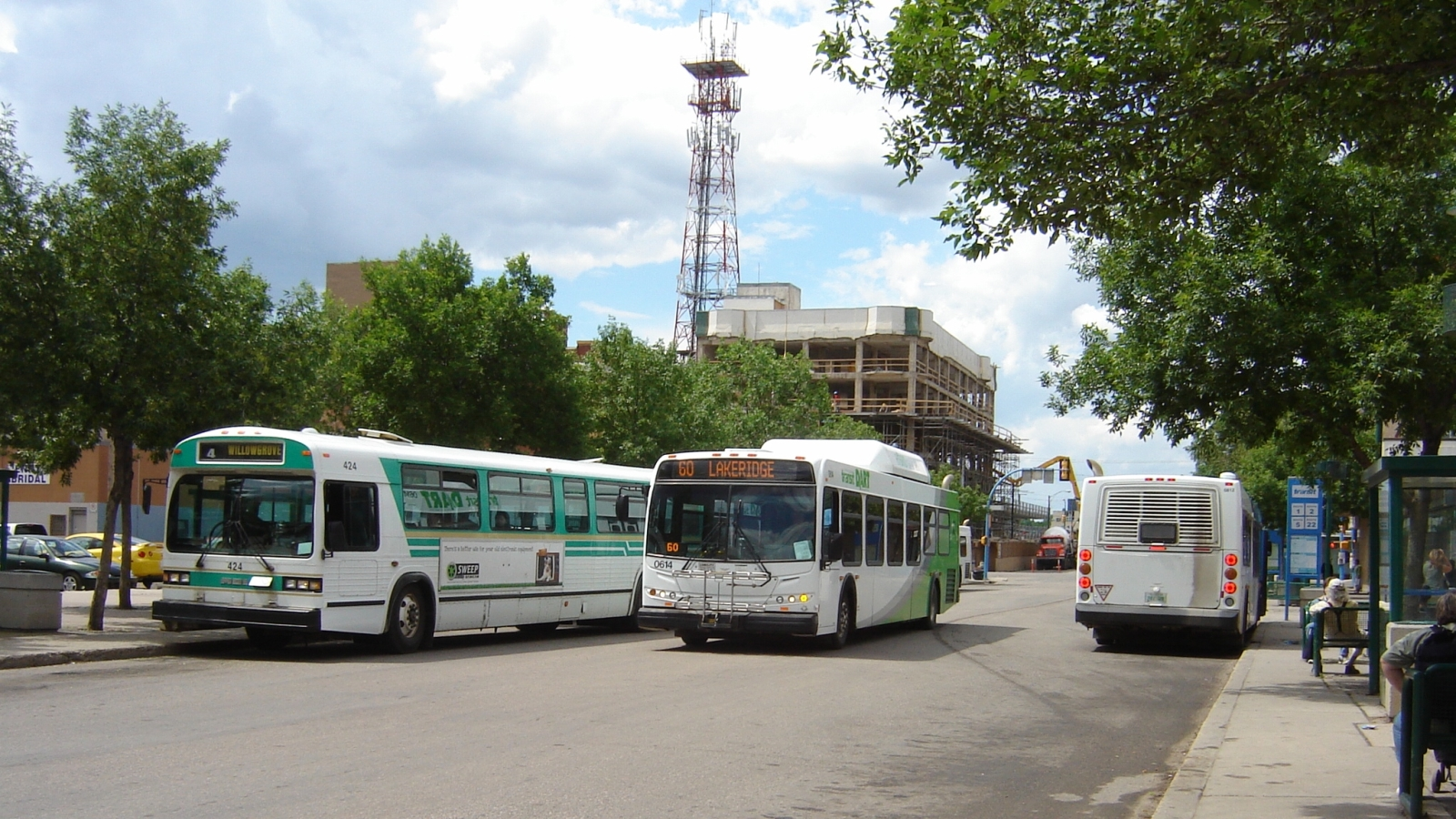

General information
- Location: 23rd St between 2nd Ave & 3rd Ave; Saskatoon, Saskatchewan; Canada
- Coordinates: 52°07′49″N 106°39′44″W
- Bus operators: Saskatoon Transit

Construction
- Structure type: Transit mall
Location

The Downtown Saskatoon bus hub is the central transfer hub of bus transportation for Saskatoon Transit in the Central Business District of Saskatoon, Saskatchewan. It connects the city's Downtown core to other essential parts of the city, such as Confederation, or the University of Saskatchewan. It is located on 23rd Street between 2nd Avenue and 3rd Avenue. There is a small customer service centre, where people can buy or re-load a Go-Pass smart card, or get info on Saskatoon Transit services.

== Routes ==
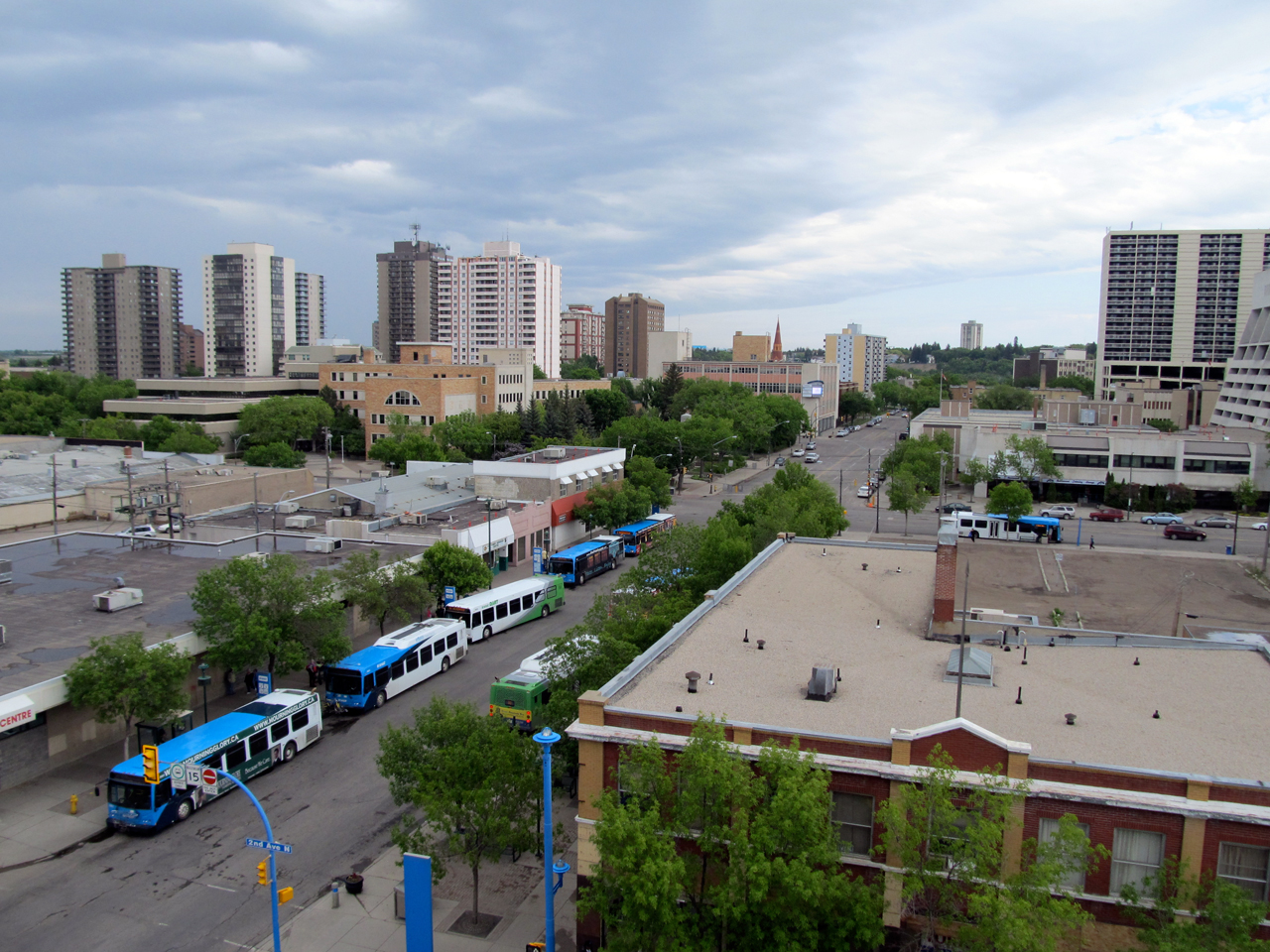
View of 23rd Street East transit mall

There are seventeen passenger routes and one civic operations route serviced by six terminals. The terminal is served by bus routes that include:

- 1 Exhibition/City Centre
- 2 Meadowgreen/City Centre
- 3 Hudson Bay Park/City Centre
- 5 Confederation/City Centre
- 6 Wilson Crescent/City Centre
- 7 Dundonald/City Centre
- 8 8th Street/City Centre
- 9 Riversdale/City Centre
- 11 Airport/City Centre
- 12 River Heights/City Centre
- 15 Civic Operations Centre (not available for transportation; this route taxis buses between the garage and the hub)
- 16 Eastview/City Centre
- 19 Centre Mall/City Centre
- 22 City Centre/Confederation
- 30 Lawson Heights/City Centre
- 35 Silverwood Heights/City Centre
- 60 Confederation/City Centre
- 65 Kensington/City Centre
