= Linker =

Linker or linkers may refer to:

== Computing ==
- Linker (computing), a computer program that takes one or more object files generated by a compiler or an assembler and links them with libraries, generating an executable program or shared library
  - GNU linker, the classic GNU Project's implementation of the Unix linker command ld
- Dynamic linker, the part of an operating system that loads and links the shared libraries for an executable program at run time

== People ==
- Amy Linker (born 1966), American actress
- Zita Linker (1917–2009), Israeli politician
- Eduard Linkers (1912–2004), an Austrian actor

== Biology ==
- Linker DNA, the part of a genomic DNA strand that connects two nucleosomes
- Polylinker or multiple cloning site, a short segment of DNA with many restriction sites
- Signal transducing adaptor protein, proteins that provide mechanisms by which receptors can amplify and regulate downstream effector proteins
  - Linker of activated T cells, a protein in the biochemical signaling path transferring signals from T cell antigen receptors
  - B-cell linker, a human gene that encodes a linker protein related to B cells
- Linker peptide, a flexible part of a peptide between relatively rigid structural domains.

== Chemistry ==
- Linker (peptide synthesis), a molecule that connects a solid phase support to a peptide during synthesis

== Other uses ==
- In linguistics, a connective such as a conjunction, an adposition, ezāfe, etc.
- Inflation-indexed bond or linker, bonds for which the principal is indexed to inflation

== See also ==
- Link (disambiguation)
