= Lincs (disambiguation) =

Lincs is an abbreviation for Lincolnshire, England.

Lincs or LINCS may also refer to:

- Linc's, an American television series from 1998 to 2000
- Lincs Wind Farm, off the east coast of England
- Lincs FM, former name of a UK Independent Local Radio radio station serving Lincolnshire and Newark, now known as Hits Radio Lincolnshire
- Literacy Information and Communication System, an adult education program maintained by the Office of Career, Technical, and Adult Education
- Laser Interconnect and Networking Communication System, LINCS A/B, two cubesats for laser communications tests

== See also ==
- Linc (disambiguation)
- Links (disambiguation)
