= Saskatoon Christian School =

Location
- 55 Glazier Road; Corman Park, Saskatchewan, S7K 3J8; Canada; 52.087616°N 106.591687°W

Information
- Type: Independent day school
- Religious affiliation: Christian
- Opened: 1983
- School board: Independent
- Director: David Harris
- Principal: Murray Long
- Grades: Kindergarten to Grade 12
- Enrollment: 246 (2021)
- Language: English
- Colours: Blue, gold
- Team name: Royals
- Website: saskatoonchristianschool.ca

Saskatoon Christian School (SCS) is an independent faith-based elementary and secondary school located south of Lakeview and east of Stonebridge, in Corman Park, Saskatchewan, Canada. The institution provides Christian instruction from Kindergarten to Grade 12, in full compliance with the Saskatchewan Ministry of Education's Goals of Education and Curriculum Policy.

The school was established in 1983, and is operated by the Saskatoon Society for Christian Education.

== History ==
In 1978, a few families decided to build a Christian school in Saskatoon and, in 1981, the Saskatoon Society for Christian Education was formed. The school opened in 1983, using three rented rooms at John Lake School, with 33 students, 2 staff and a K-8 program. The school moved to 2410 Haultain Avenue as tenants of the Saskatoon Full Gospel Church in 1985.

In 1993, SCS received Accredited School status from the Saskatchewan Department of Education. In the following year, the school introduced Grade 9 into its curriculum. In 1999, SCS was accepted as an “associate school” with Saskatoon Public School Division which allowed the school to receive partial funding and access to school division resources. In 2002, the school added Grades 10 to 12 to its curriculum.

In 2003, the school's current facility was built on 37 acres of land. Student enrollment reached 350 in 2010, prompting the school to expand its facilities to include four additional classrooms, a fine arts room and a multi-purpose auditorium.

In 2020, the school was awarded Qualified Independent School status by the Ministry of Education.

In 2022, SCS became the first Certified Independent School in the province.
