= Saskatoon Transit =

Public transport system in Saskatchewan, Canada

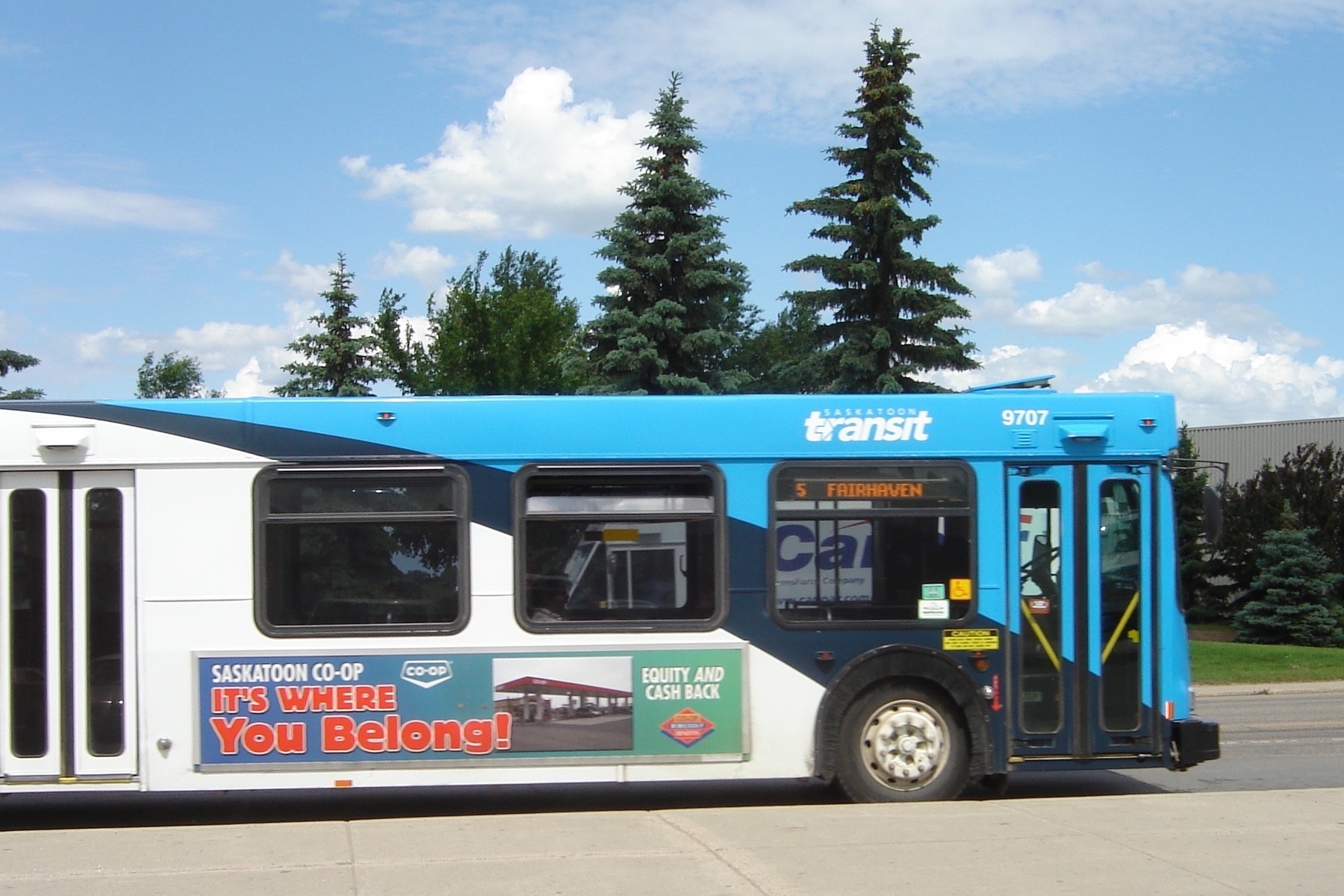
- Formerly: Saskatoon Municipal Railway
- Founded: 1913; 113 years ago
- Headquarters: 301 24th Street West
- Locale: Saskatoon, SK
- Service area: Saskatoon
- Service type: bus service, paratransit, bus rapid transit
- Routes: 39
- Stops: 1357
- Hubs: 7
- Fleet: 137 buses: 119 low-floor, 40-foot buses, 3 low floor, 40-foot hybrid buses, 9 low-floor 60-foot articulated buses, and 8 low-floor, 30-foot buses.
- Annual ridership: 4.6 million
- Fuel type: Diesel, Electric
- Operator: City of Saskatoon
- Website: Saskatoon Transit

Saskatoon Transit (formerly Saskatoon Municipal Railway) is the public transport arm of the City of Saskatoon, Saskatchewan, Canada. It operates a fleet of diesel buses. A total of 39 bus routes serve every area of the city, carrying approximately 11 million passengers in 2008. Saskatoon Transit is a member of the Canadian Urban Transit Association. The major bus terminal is located Downtown.

== History ==
=== Saskatoon Municipal Railway ===
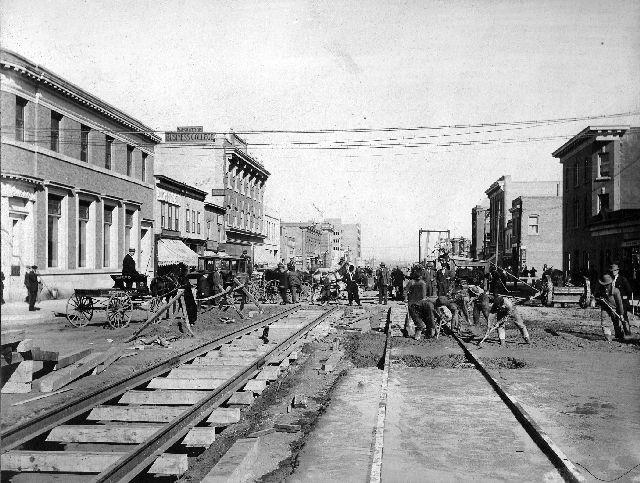
Laying of the streetcar tracks began in 1912.

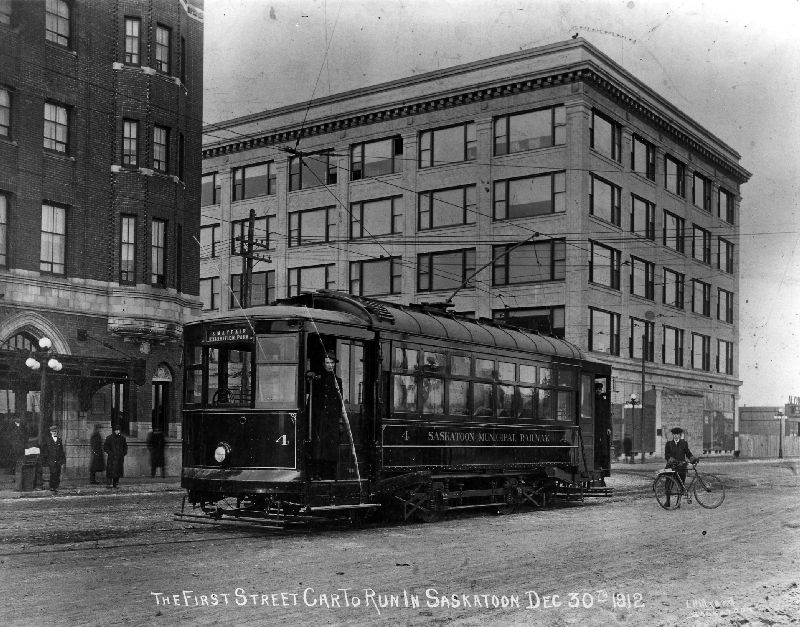
The earliest streetcar run occurred in December 1912.

Saskatoon Transit was initially known as the Saskatoon Municipal Railway (SMR). In 1912, a franchise was granted to a man named H. M. Evans to develop a street railway. No work on this was done and the city revoked Evans' franchise on May 15. Following this, the city consulted the Boston, Massachusetts, transit planning firm of Stone and Webster, which advised in a report that the future street railway should be municipally operated. The city government began work and by the end of the year, 17 miles (27 km) of track had been laid. Streetcar service began on January 1, 1913, using a roster of twelve cars built by the St. Louis Car Company. Despite near-blizzard conditions that day, the service launch was a success, with some 5200 passengers riding the cars. Over 3 million people rode the system in its first year. Lines and routes followed a radial pattern outward from a central loop which passed by both the Canadian National Railway and Canadian Pacific Railway stations. The terminus of each line had a turning loop allowing cars to return. Initial fares were 5¢ for an adult ticket and 3¢ for a child. Packs were sold for 25¢ and contained 6 adult or 8 child tickets.

In its early years, the system changed fairly little. Before the end of the first year, the street railway negotiated a contract with the Amalgamated Association of Street and Electrical Railway Employees of America, Division Number 615. Unlike in cities like Hamilton, Ontario, or Saint John, New Brunswick (site of the 1914 Saint John street railway strike), the street railway did not have a notably turbulent labour history, with only a brief interruption in streetcar service during a coordinated sympathy strike organized by the Saskatoon Trades and Labour Council in support of the Winnipeg General Strike of 1919. The Trades and Labour Council also successfully protested the city council's attempt to raise streetcar fares to five cents in May 1914. The initial routes had a connection to the then-town of Sutherland, via Broadway Avenue and 8th Street; the Mayfair–University line was shorter, running only from 33rd Street and Avenue F to 12th Street and Lansdowne Avenue via the 19th Street Bridge. As well the Avenue H and 7th Avenue lines ran as separate routes, and 7th Avenue ended at Princess Street. Initially Avenue H ran only a single car, with two on the 2nd Avenue–7th Avenue line and four each on the longer two lines.

The municipal railway's streetcar roster changed considerably throughout its time operating. Streetcars were initially unheated, but in 1914 and 1915, they received coal and electric heaters. Six additional streetcars were added to the roster between 1914 and 1917. These consisted of three second-hand single-truck cars called "Carolinas", as well as three large double-truck cars built by either the Preston Car Company or the Ottawa Car Company. The double-truck cars, however, proved too heavy for use over the 19th Street Bridge. Rail historian Anthony Clegg stated in a 1964 article in Canadian Rail that in 1919, the three cars were exchanged with the Calgary Municipal Railway for five lighter cars; however, John Meikle argued in a supplemental to a later issue of Canadian Rail that the 1919 exchange was of six double-ended Preston-built cars for six Ottawa-built ones from Calgary, which were single-ended.

1920–21 was marked with debate over one-man versus two-man crews, with the railway ultimately opting for one-man crews in 1921. It experienced one of its most notable accidents not long afterward, in 1922, when a streetcar derailed near the 19th Street Bridge, coming to rest at the waterfront. No one was seriously injured. A major rolling stock renewal occurred between 1927 and 1930, when some older streetcars were retired and replaced with thirteen new double-truck cars built by National Steel Car of Hamilton and the Ottawa Car Company. It was during this period that bus services first began, as rented buses were used to supplement the streetcars.

Saskatoon Municipal Railway routes (1945):
Route	Description
Mayfair–University (Red)	From Avenue A & 33rd Street along Avenue F, across Broadway Bridge to the University at College Street & Bottomley Avenue
Pleasant Hill–Exhibition (Green)	From St. Paul's Hospital at Avenue P along 20th Street, across Broadway Bridge to 9th Street and down Lorne Avenue to the Exhibition grounds at Lorne & Ash St
Avenue H–7th Avenue (White)	From 11th Street & Avenue H to the 20th Street line, up Avenue A to 23rd Street then along 2nd Avenue to City Park, ending at 7th Avenue south of 33rd Street.

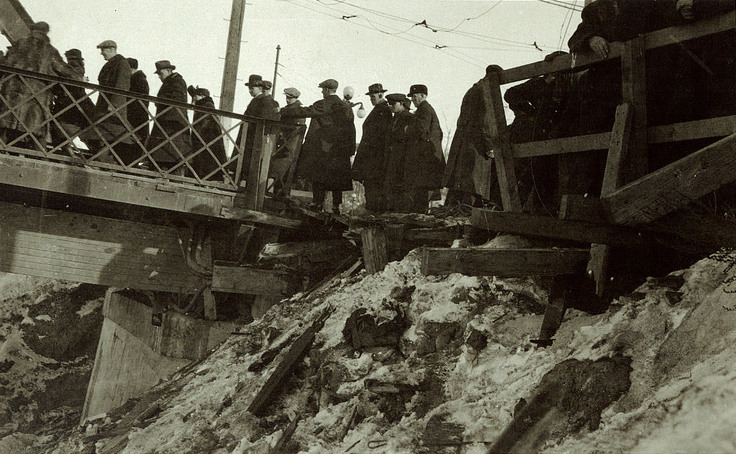
The aftermath of the 1922 derailment.

The first bus-only route began operating in 1931. It ran from Westmount to the armouries at 19th Street and 3rd Avenue. Great Depression-era infrastructure improvements led to a grade separation along 19th Street, benefitting 7th Avenue and Avenue H service; the 19th Street Subway opened on July 1, 1931. On July 21, 1933, streetcars shifted to the newly built Broadway Bridge, another Great Depression-era make-work project. The city's final significant investment in the streetcar system was in 1941, when five additional cars were purchased second-hand after being used on the London Street Railway in London, Ontario, which had switched to diesel bus operations in 1940. This proved a warning sign for the Saskatoon system, which by this point had contracted to three streetcar routes which were fed by secondary bus routes connecting them to outlying suburban areas. By 1945 Saskatoon Municipal Railway owned 41 passenger cars.

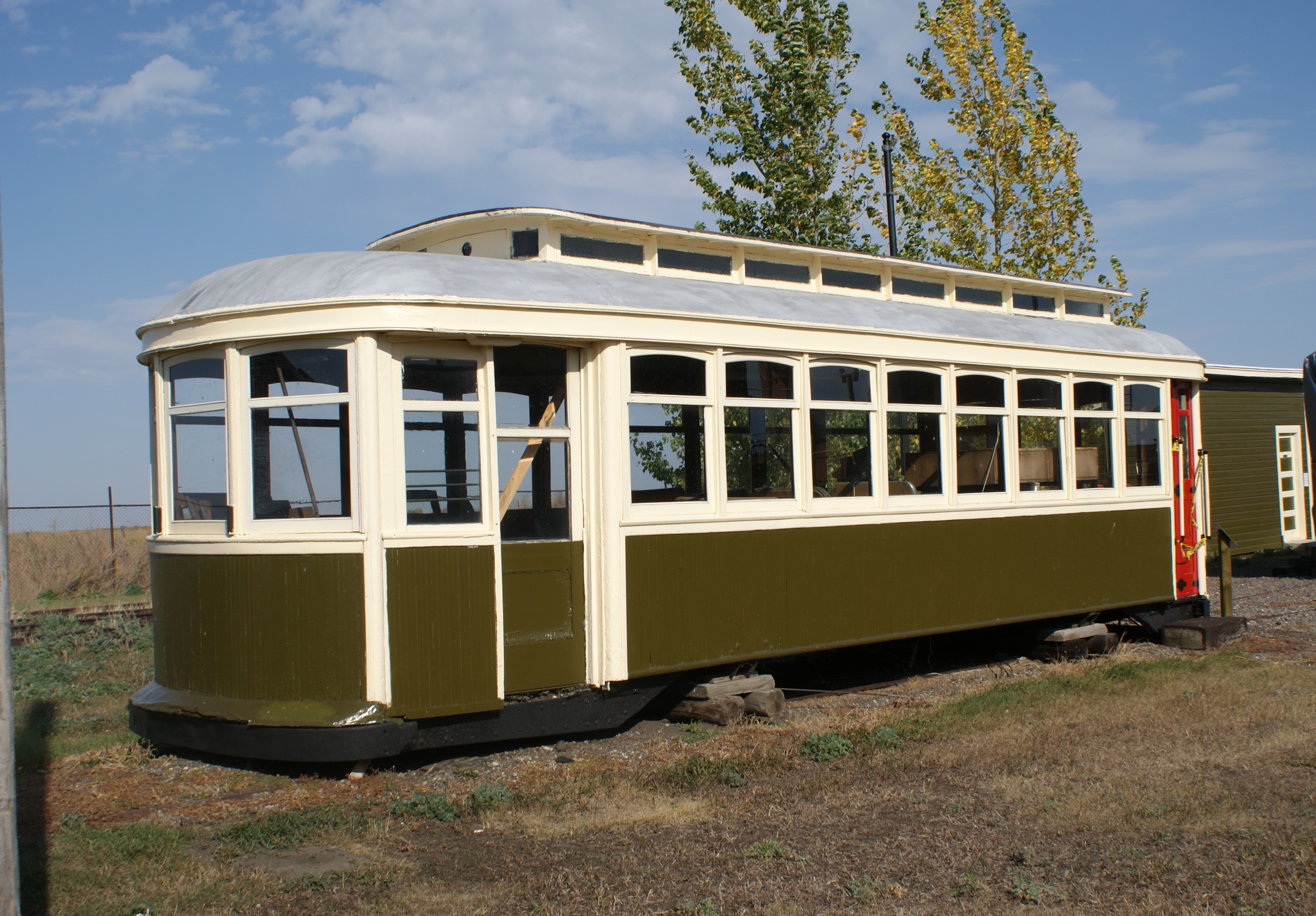
Streetcar #40 in original Saskatoon Municipal Railway livery at the Saskatchewan Railway Museum.

On December 12, 1946, a report was presented which proposed the total conversion of the system to exclusively use motorized buses and trolleybuses. A change in management in 1947 cemented the proposal. Conversion was gradual and done route-by-route. The 7th Avenue–Avenue H route was first converted to motor bus on October 1, 1947, before being converted to trolleybus service a year later, on November 28, 1948. Trolleybuses were introduced on the Pleasant Hill section of the Pleasant Hill–Exhibition route in September 1949. This came not long after an official name change to the Saskatoon Transit System, a name the municipal system would continue to use for decades afterward; this occurred on August 15, 1949. Use of the city's coat of arms on transit vehicles ended on July 14, 1950, when it was replaced with the plain letters "STS". Even so, streetcar operations continued for over a year, with trolleybuses and streetcars being used interchangeably along electrified parts of the system. The last recorded streetcar run was on November 10, 1951, after which most of the streetcars were scrapped. Three of the streetcars were preserved; one was returned to the United States, where it had originally operated, and two were retained for display at the Saskatchewan Railway Museum.

=== Saskatoon Transit System ===
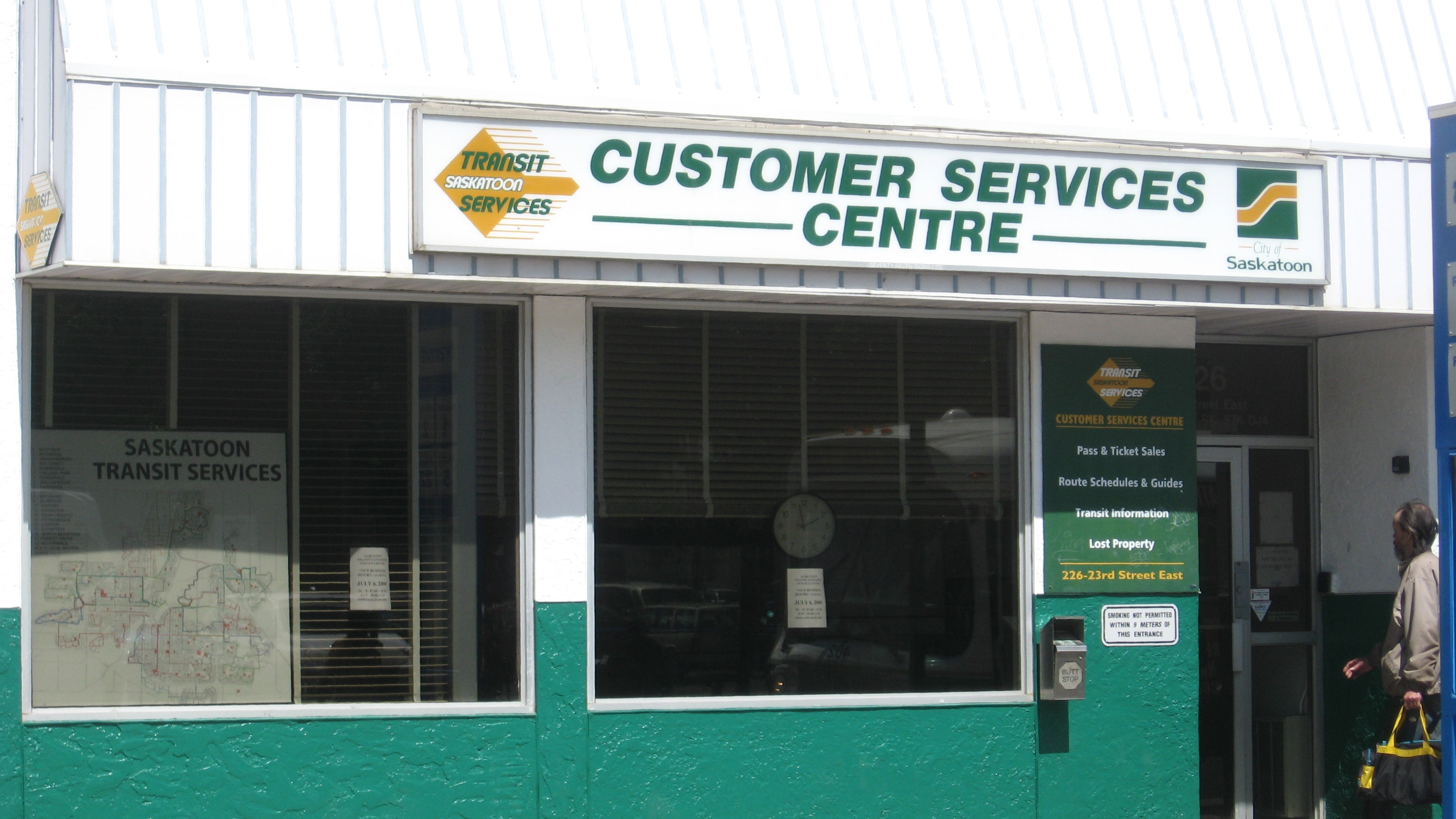
Customer Services Centre at 23d Street transit terminal

Trolleybus service was itself discontinued in 1974.

The central transfer point for most bus routes has always been the block of 23rd Street between 2nd and 3rd Avenues and the neighbouring corners on 2nd and 3rd Avenues. In 1984, this block was permanently closed to regular traffic and a "Transit Terminal" constructed, consisting of widened sidewalks, heated shelters, and angled curbs to provide three "bays" on each side of the block. The 23rd Street Transit Terminal was opened on November 2, 1984. This terminal area is perceived by many as unsafe, and most of the businesses along this block have relocated; however, Saskatoon Transit has made some recent improvements, including a constant security guard presence and a Customer Service Centre where tickets, passes and schedules may be obtained. The 2005 Strategic Plan Study recommended that major improvements be carried out to the downtown terminal, but by 2020, no changes had been made.

Although the official name is now Saskatoon Transit Services (as of 1998), it is generally known simply as Saskatoon Transit, which is what appears on their Web page, logo, and all their brochures.

The servicing garage was located in the Caswell Hill neighbourhood, on the north side of 24th Street between Avenues C and D; having expanded to a second facility across 24th Street in 1948.

=== 2005 Strategic Plan Study ===
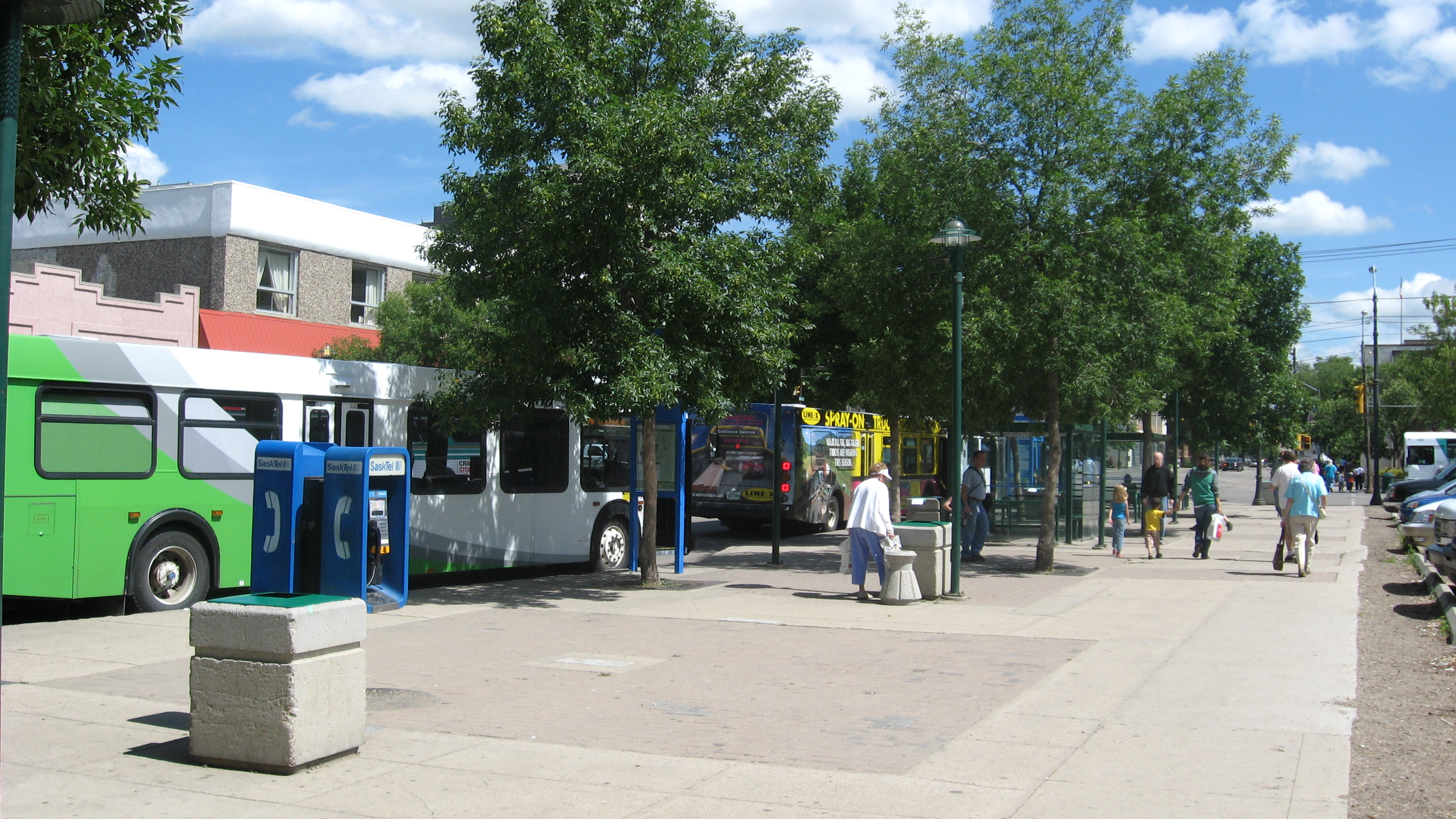
23d Street transit terminal, looking toward Third Avenue

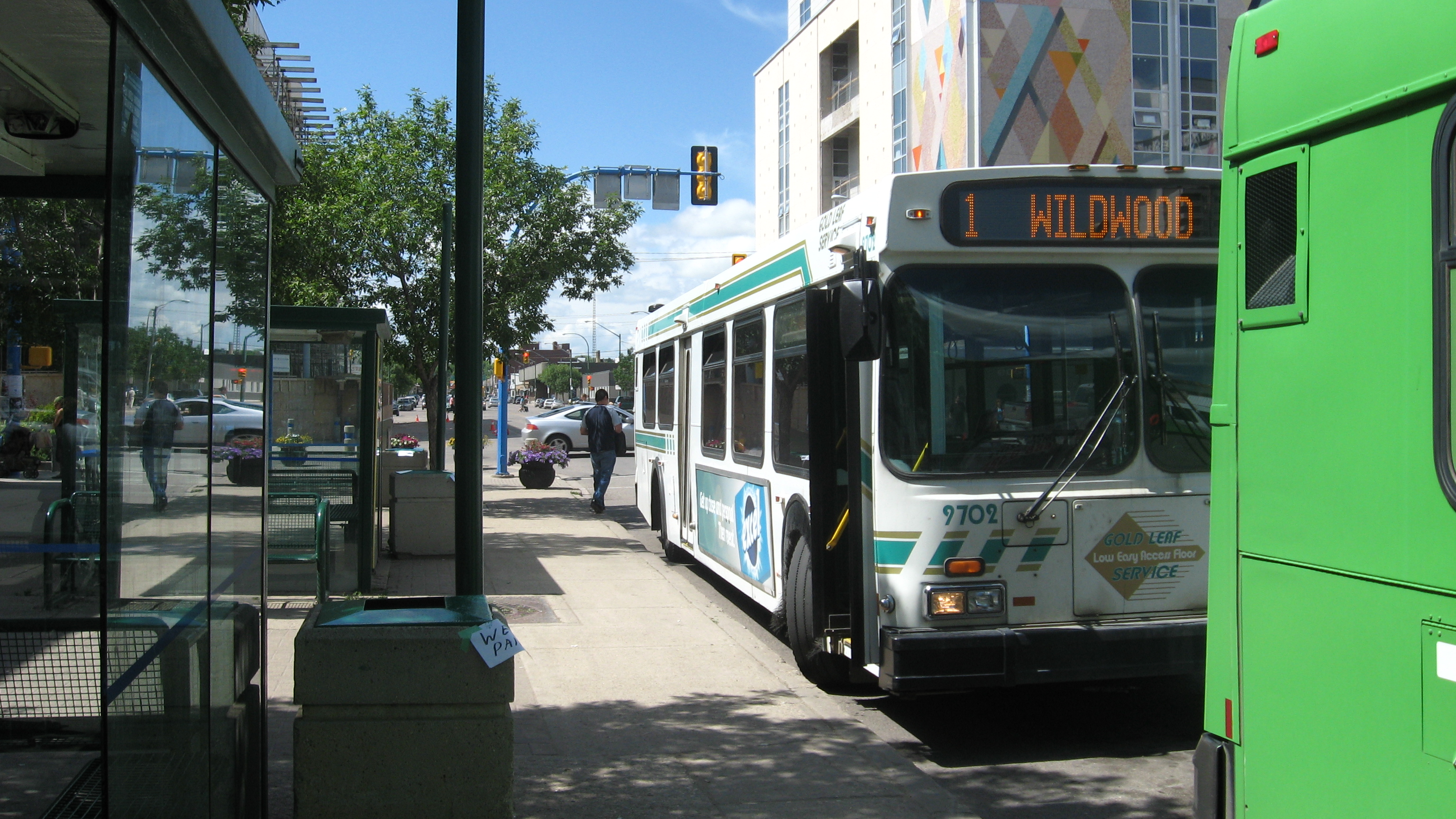
23d Street terminal, looking toward Second Avenue

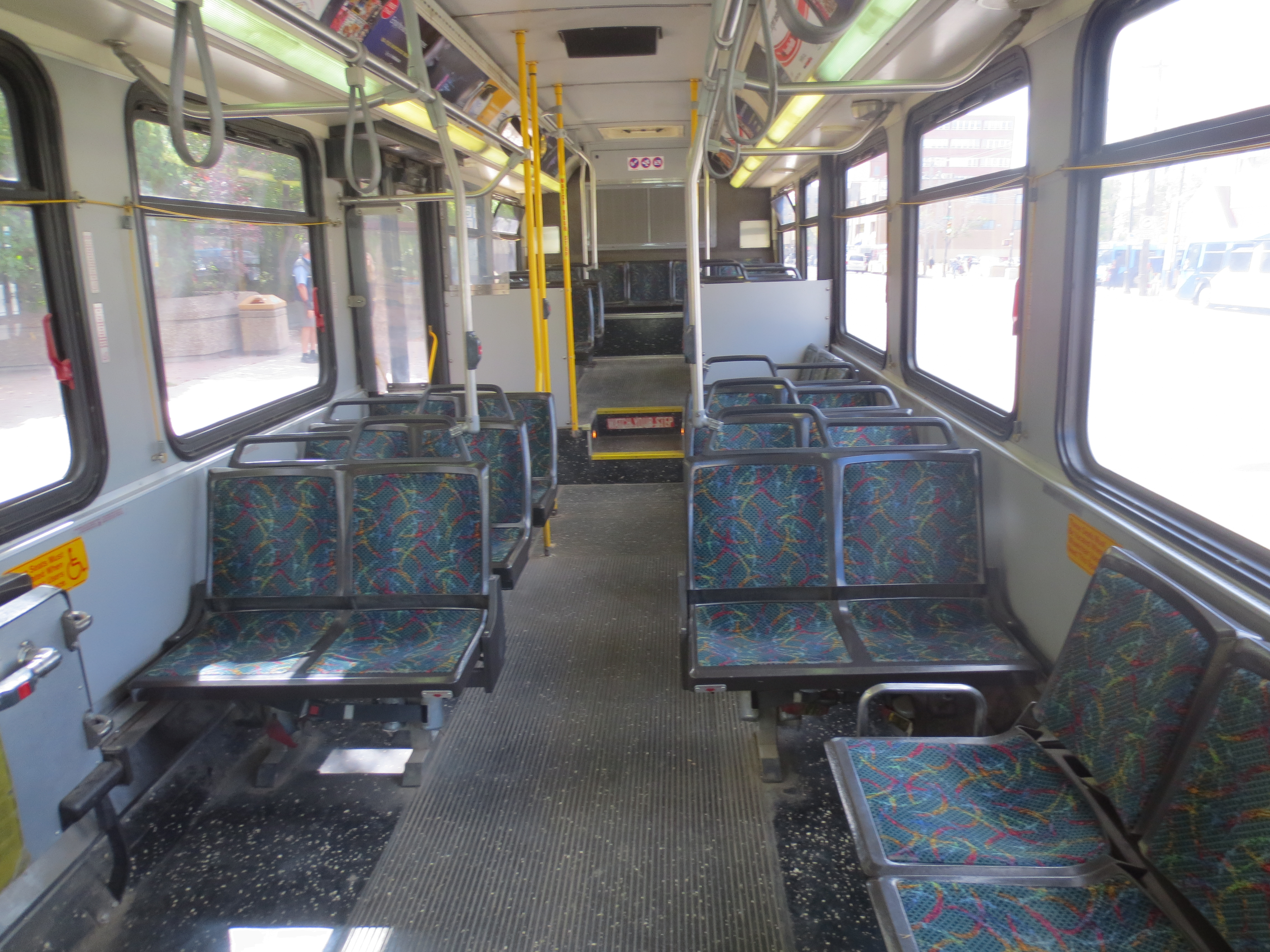
Interior view of a typical bus in August 2014

A comprehensive study of Saskatoon Transit's service was undertaken in 2005, outlining many deficiencies and making many recommendations. Transit ridership had fallen from 12.4 million passengers in 1987 to 7.2 million passengers in 2005, while the city's population increased from 182,000 to 214,000. The conclusions of the study were summarised in a Short Term Plan and a Long Term Plan. Most of the recommendations of the Short Term Plan have been implemented, and the Long Term Plan is being carried out, subject of course to funding and other considerations.

The main recommendations of the Short Term Plan were to re-orient the current regular service network to better serve the University of Saskatchewan and other key destinations, to introduce higher-order "DART" service on four corridors interlined into two routes, and to construct a new bus terminal at Market Mall, as well as to make major improvements to the terminals downtown and at the university.

The routes in place prior to 2006 had not been substantially modified since the 1970s, and some since the 1950s, with the result that many neighbourhoods, particularly the newer suburbs, had poor service. Some areas such as Montgomery Place and Briarwood had no bus service at all on weekends. Many outlying neighbourhoods (e.g., Dundonald, Silverspring, Briarwood) had "stub routes" that deposited riders at a suburban mall transfer point, necessitating a transfer, and often two or three, to get anywhere in the city. Post-secondary institutions were under-served relative to the number of students using the buses; SIAST Kelsey Campus had only one major route serving it, so that trips to SIAST from most places in Saskatoon involved a transfer onto an overcrowded bus. Due to extreme congestion at the University of Saskatchewan, several routes bypassed the campus altogether, forcing students to cross College Drive on foot. Service to the airport was nonexistent, and service to industrial areas was extremely poor. Demand in these areas was also extremely low, at least in part due to the poor service.

The Market Mall terminal has been built, and a temporary terminal with car traffic prohibited has been built at the university, pending a longer-term solution. Work has yet to begin on improving or relocating the downtown terminal.

The Long Term Plan is a 10-year plan that focuses on the infrastructure needed to maintain the improvements to the system implemented in the Short Term Plan and expansion needed to keep up with the expected increases in ridership that the improvements will generate. Issues include staffing, fleet replacement, refurbishing older buses, maintenance, new technologies such as emissions reduction and "smart" fare collection. Critical items include:

- Rejuvenating the fleet. The industry standard is to replace buses on an 18-year cycle; by this standard, Saskatoon Transit's fleet is quite old. The plan recommends replacing 6 buses a year through 2010, and 7 buses a year for the remaining years of the plan, as well as expanding the fleet by 12 buses.
- New transit garage. The current transit garage is too small for the fleet and surrounded by residential properties that make it undesirable if not impossible to expand the facility. A satellite facility or entirely new facility in a different location, probably an industrial park, is recommended within the next 5 years.
- More bus shelters. The plan recommends a target number of 215 bus shelters (30% of stops), or 22 per year over the course of the plan, up from 3 or 4 per year that are currently installed.
- Fare technology. A review of fare collection options, and in particular smart card technology, should be undertaken within a year.
- Transit-oriented development. Work with urban planners to design neighbourhoods that work with public transit and discourage use of private vehicles.
- Signal priority and queue-jump lanes. Allow buses to avoid congestion by "turning the lights green" for them, and providing bus-only lanes where needed, for instance at the approaches to University Bridge.

As of 2022, there are no priority signals, queue-jumps, nor transit-oriented-development of a notable scale to have materialized within the city.

=== DART (Direct Access Rapid Transit) ===
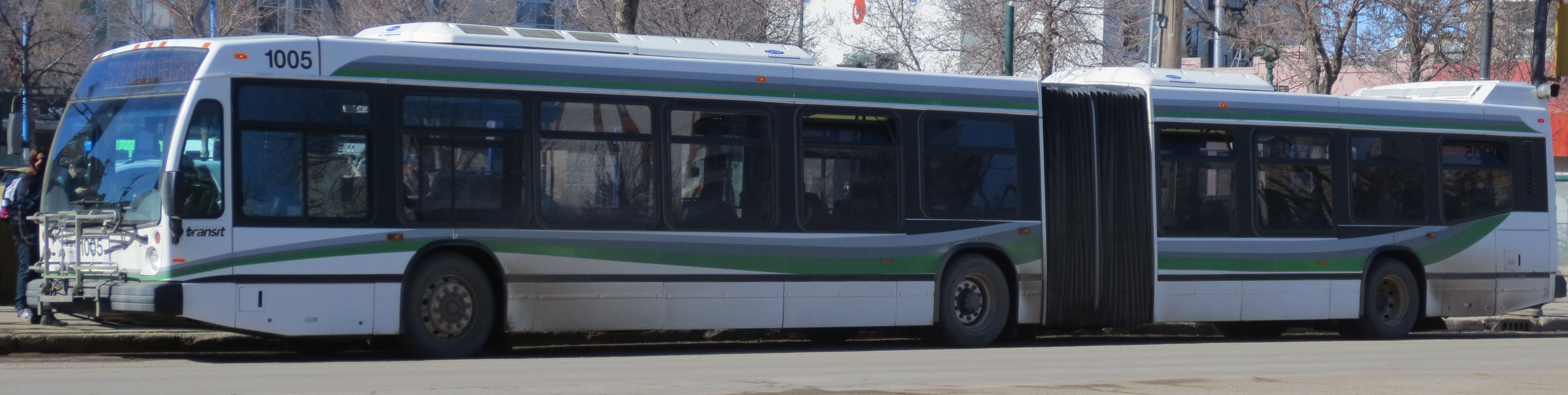
Saskatoon Transit articulated bus

DART was Saskatoon Transit's pseudo-bus rapid transit service. Unveiled on July 2, 2006, the four DART routes used to interline in the central sections to form two corridors with extremely frequent service. Along this portion of their routes, bus stops were widely spaced to increase speed, and there were "express" sections on each route with no stops for over a kilometre. The interlined routes 50/60 ran from Confederation Mall to The Centre via downtown and the University of Saskatchewan, and routes 70/80 ran from Lawson Heights Mall to the University Heights Suburban Centre via SIAST Kelsey Campus, downtown and the university. The routes each continued past these points, each serving a residential loop at either end (a total of 8 loops). Low floor buses were used on the DART routes. All buses procured for service were outfitted with bicycle racks on the front and most were air conditioned. As of the 2018 transit route reorganization, the DART service was phased out in favour of interlining several less-frequent routes to provide more regular service (i.e. routes 4/43, 44, and 45; and 8/81, 82, 83, 84, and 86).

=== Lockouts and Labour Action ===
The contract for bus drivers had expired in 2012 and operators were working without a contract. In 2014, the City of Saskatoon locked out drivers while negotiations continued; This was deemed illegal by the Saskatchewan Labour Board, as there was a labour practice case before the board at the time of the lockout. The workers were again locked out in 2015, however this was vetoed by City Council and rescinded. After four years without a collective bargaining agreement, the Union (Amalgamated Transit Local 615) took action and drivers went on strike on November 12, 2016. The strike lasted about a month, after which the City and Union reached an agreement on Dec 9, which was accepted by the Union with 55.83% of the vote.

=== Bus barn re-location ===
Saskatoon Transit Service has housed its operational headquarters around the 1913 original streetcar building at Avenue C and 24th Street. The city transit service afterwards adopted this area for bus warehouse garages and offices between Avenue C and D at 24th Street. In early 2017, transit storage and maintenance was moved to the newly built Civic Operations Centre. The building has space to house over 200 vehicles and will help facilitate the growth and future electrification of Saskatoon's transit service and other municipal vehicles.

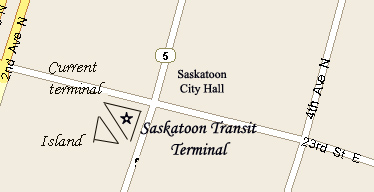
Location of new terminal featuring island as well for raised platform stops near the building

=== Transit Terminal ===
On July 16, 2008, Saskatoon city council authorized a $4.2 million transit terminal to be constructed on a parking lot adjacent to the current on-street terminal. The new terminal would have centred around a 600-square-meter (6,500 sq ft) LEED-certified building with a green roof, surrounded by a ring of raised-platform stops. In addition to Saskatoon Transit, the building could also house a coffee shop and government offices such as social services or immigration. However, with the announcement of the new Bus Rapid Transit system came the news that the downtown transit mall will be removed as all three lines will share a station downtown on 1st Avenue. This will open all of 23rd Street to general traffic for the first time in nearly 40 years.

== Fares ==
Fares may be paid by the Go-Pass smart card, or cash (coins only effective February 2010). The adult cash fare is currently $3.00 (as of Feb 2016), which includes unlimited transfers for 90 minutes from time of payment. Primary and secondary school students pay reduced fares.

Seniors are eligible for discounted passes lasting 3 months to a year. Riders on social assistance are also eligible for discounted monthly passes.

=== Post-secondary students ===
University of Saskatchewan undergraduate students pay a mandatory U-PASS fee (currently $69.50 per term) for a universal transit pass, in the form of a validation sticker on their student card. Students living in on-campus residences and others with special circumstances may apply for an exemption.

Other post-secondary students may purchase a 4-month semester pass at a slightly reduced price compared to the adult monthly pass.

=== Go-Pass ===
Effective February 2010, Saskatoon Transit has upgraded its fare system to use a smart card system called Go-Pass. The card has replaced tickets, day passes and monthly passes, respectively with a refillable fare card and unlimited-fare cards that expire after a day or month. The system cost Saskatoon Transit $2.9 million. The system's roll-out date was delayed to February 2010 in order to avoid problems with the new system during the 2010 World Junior Ice Hockey Championships.

Smart cards have been adopted to limit fraud—such as forged monthly passes and short-changed fares—and to reduce the potential for conflict between driver and passenger. Rather than showing the card to the driver, the card is swiped across the reader and may remain inside a wallet. Transfers are barcoded and scanned when a passenger boards. The new fare boxes do not accept bills, but coins are accepted and the values displayed to both rider and driver.

Mobile Ticketing

Mobile ticketing was fully released in 2021. An additional ticket scanner was added into the bus and could be scanned with the mobile app. Fares are the same price online and in person.

== Routes ==
After waiting for some time, the city of Saskatoon partnered with Google Maps in 2016 to provide an online mapping website. This interface takes the routes and city schedules currently available and Google Maps will then calculate the optimal connection for transport between two addresses and the time to be at the designated bus stop for bus service.

=== Route name ===
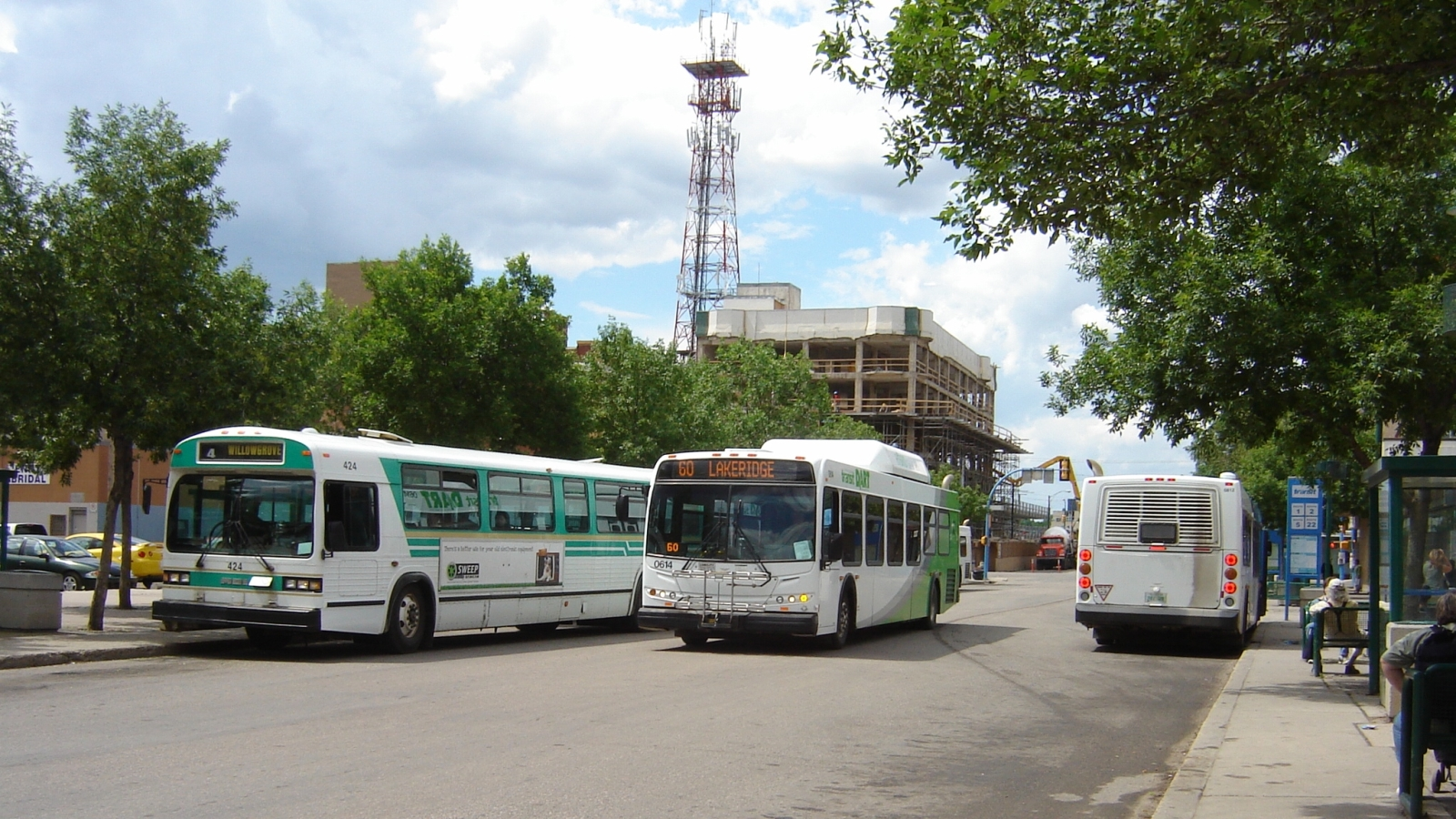
Downtown transit terminal in Saskatoon

The names next to each route number are displayed on the front of each bus.

- 1 Exhibition – City Centre
- 2 Meadowgreen – City Centre
- 3 Hudson Bay Park – City Centre
- 4/43 City Centre / Evergreen†
- 4/44 City Centre / Willowgrove
- 4/45 City Centre / Arbor Creek
- 4/46 City Centre / 115 Street†
- 5 Confederation Terminal – City Centre
- 6 Wilson Crescent – City Centre
- 7 Dundonald – City Centre
- 8 8th Street - City Centre
- 9 Riversdale – City Centre via Riversdale
- 10 University via Cumberland - Centre Mall via Taylor
- 11 Airport – City Centre
- 12 River Heights – City Centre
- 14 North Industrial
- 15 Civic Operations Centre - City Centre
- 16 Eastview via Preston - City Centre
- 17 Stonebridge – University - Lawson Heights
- 18 College Park – University
- 19 Centre Mall – City Centre
- 22 City Centre – Confederation‡
- 25 SaskTel Centre‡
- 26 Forest Grove – University
- 27 Silverspring – University
- 29 Brighton – Nelson Road / University ☆
- 30 Lawson Heights – City Centre
- 35 Silverwood Heights – City Centre
- 50 Lakeview – University
- 55 Lakeridge – University
- 60 Confederation – City Centre
- 61 Blairmore – Confederation
- 63 Hampton Village – Confederation
- 64 McCormack – Confederation
- 65 Kensington – Confederation
- 83 Centre Mall - Stonebridge
- 84 Centre Mall - Briarwood
- 86 Centre Mall - Rosewood
- 87 Meadows – Centre Mall ‡
- OnDemand 1
- OnDemand 2
- OnDemand 3
- OnDemand 4
† Monday - Friday only.

‡ Monday - Friday, peak times only.

☆ Monday - Friday only, reduced service when U of S not in session.

=== Regular and commuter routes ===
There are 50 bus routes serving Saskatoon, 32 of which are full service. The remaining routes only operate weekday service, with some in one direction at a time, either towards the downtown or the University in the morning, or towards their respective terminals in the afternoon; and others in both directions, but hourly during the peak hours only.

=== Combined routes ===
Some buses change their route number at their terminals, which is also known as a "stay-in-seat transfer" because the passengers do not have to leave the bus when it changes to the different route. The list of these "transfers" is as follows:

- 1 Exhibition becomes 7 Dundonald at Downtown Terminal
- 3 Hudson Bay Park becomes 9 Riversdale at Downtown Terminal
- 9 Riversdale becomes 3 Hudson Bay Park at Downtown Terminal
- 7 Dundonald becomes 1 Exhibition at Downtown Terminal
- 9 Riversdale becomes 64 McCormack at Confederation Terminal
- 11 City Centre becomes 15 Civic Operations Centre at Downtown Terminal
- 12 River Heights becomes 19 Centre Mall via Lorne Avenue at Downtown Terminal
- 5 Confederation Terminal becomes 15 Civic Operations Centre at Downtown Terminal
- 15 Civic Operations Centre becomes 5 Confederation Terminal at Downtown Terminal
- 15 Civic Operations Centre becomes 11 Airport at Downtown Terminal
- 18 College Park becomes 83 Stonebridge at Centre Mall
- 19 City Centre via Market Mall becomes 12 River Heights at Downtown Terminal
- 43, 44, 45, and 46 become 4 City Centre at Nelson and Lowe, and leave downtown as the corresponding 4x route.
- 61 Blairmore becomes 63 Hampton Village at Confederation Terminal
- 63 Hampton Village becomes 61 Blairmore at Confederation Terminal
- 64 McCormack becomes 5 Confederation Terminal at Confederation Terminal
- 84 Briarwood becomes 86 Rosewood at Centre Mall
- 86 Rosewood becomes 87 The Meadows at Centre Mall
- 87 The Meadows becomes 84 Briarwood at Centre Mall

== Future ==
=== Link Bus Rapid Transit ===
In April 2019, Saskatoon City Council approved a final design for a new bus rapid transit (BRT) system with an initial schedule of construction starting the summer of 2020 and the system opening for service in 2023. However, implications of the COVID-19 pandemic pushed back the timeline to commence construction in 2024 and to take place over three to four years. The system will run for 38 km over 3 lines, of which 3.5 km will be dedicated right of way. It will include 48 stations (a total of 85 platforms will be built), with 3 planned for future infill: with amenities like heated shelters, real-time information displays, transit priority signals, and public art opportunities. The city also plans to build transit-oriented developments in the Confederation S.C., University Heights S.C., and at the Centre Mall. This will be the first proper BRT system in Saskatchewan, and likely the only one for some time. In 2024, it was announced that the new BRT would be branded as "Link".

== Other services ==
=== School service and Special Events ===
Saskatoon Transit operates special morning and afternoon service to many of the city's schools, and also serves events at SaskTel Centre. Buses were once available for charter trips within 40 km of the city centre, but that was discontinued in 2019. Special routes which are available to the general public have route numbers in the 300-series, with route 333 being the SaskTel Centre special from the downtown terminal. SaskTel Centre sometimes offers charter service from locations other than the downtown, but because these are charter services which regular fare, passes and transfers do not apply, these do not have route numbers.

=== Access Transit ===
Access Transit is a shared-ride door-to-door service for people who are unable to use regular transit services. Passengers are required to register in the system and book their trips in advance, either on a per-trip basis or as a regularly scheduled "subscription trip". Fares and payment are the same as for regular transit service. Access Transit in Saskatoon has been used as a model for other cities in Canada and the United States.

== Fleet ==
Saskatoon Transit's fleet consists largely of 40-foot (12.19 m) diesel buses, of which there are approximately 120 in service. Saskatoon also has 8, 30-foot (9.1 m) and 9, 60-foot (18.29 m) articulated buses made by Nova Bus. Since 1995, Saskatoon has ordered Nova and New Flyer low-floor buses with the goal of a 100% low-floor fleet: achieved in 2018. This meant the retirement of the 6 remaining Classic high-floor buses. 371 (New Look) and 449 (Classic) are preserved and restored. Eight of the low-floor buses are hybrid electric. 88 buses are required for peak hour service commitments.

Access Transit has a fleet of 28, 26 feet (7.9 m) accessible buses (allowing for 9 spares); 26 of which are lift-equipped and the two newest of which are low-floor, "truly accessible," and the standard Saskatoon Transit plans to use for its replacement vehicles.

In fall 2009, a tender for the first 3 articulated buses was awarded to Nova Bus. These buses were delivered in April 2010 and officially unveiled at a press conference in front of city hall in June 2010. In 2014, several buses were taken in for maintenance. in September, just before the buses was re-entering service (while the bus driver was getting coffee) they left one of the buses running when a kid discovered it and took it on a 10-meter joyride before hitting another bus that was also re-entering service, causing both to go back into maintenance.

On May 31st Saskatoon Transit received its first 2 electric busses From Nova Bus. They were delivered to the civic operation centre on flatbeds. The first fleet to enter revenue service was the 2411. The 2411 entered service on July 31st 2024 at 6:05 Am With the 2410 following 10 minutes later.

Saskatoon Transit also received 5 new diesel fleets from Nova Bus In mid October - early November 2024. The fleets were purchased due to increased ridership.

Saskatoon Transit's next fleet target is to have a 100% electric fleet by 2030. In 2021, a pilot test was conducted to study the logistics of running an electric fleet, with very positive results.

Saskatoon transit buses

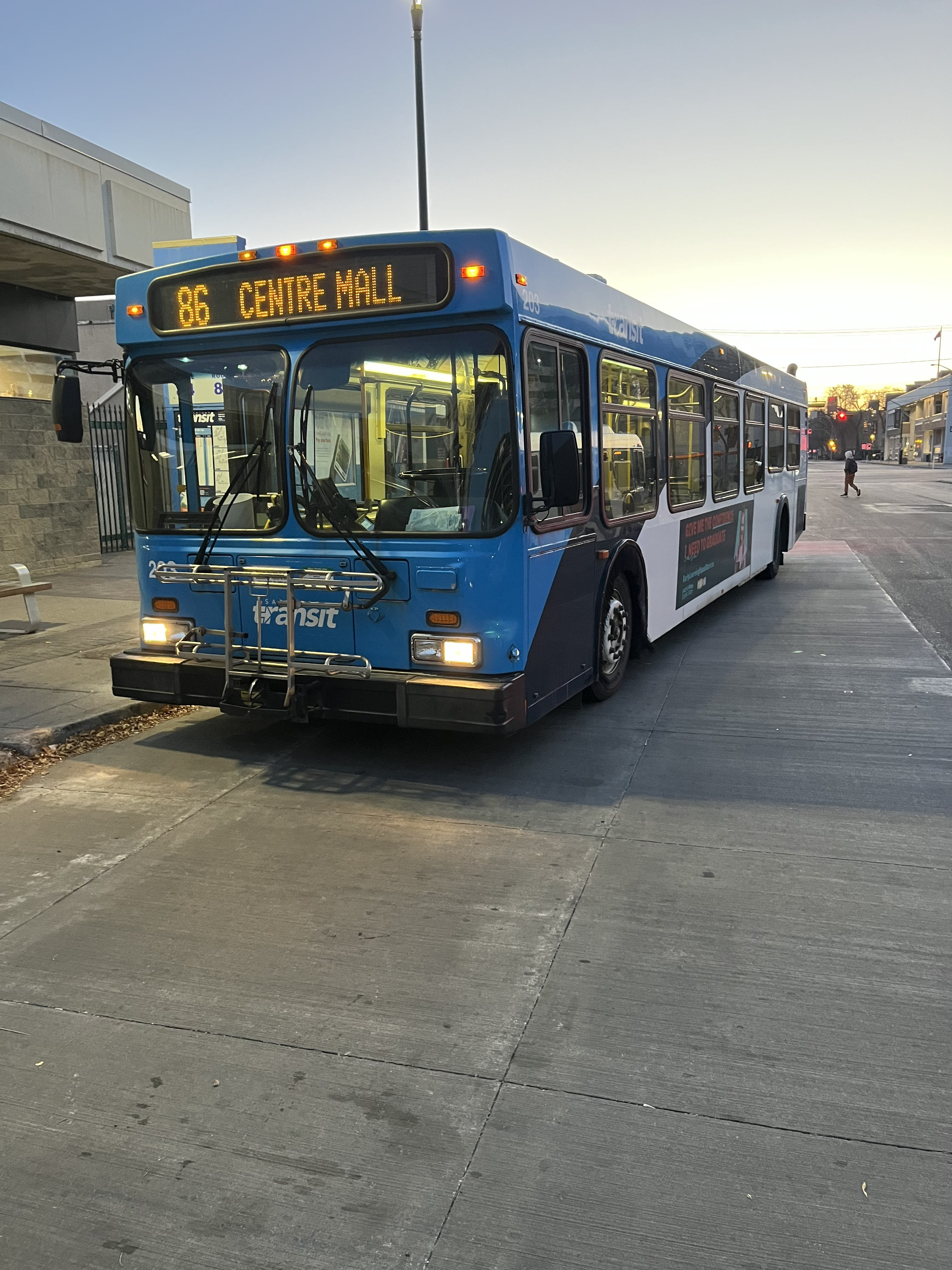
New Flyer D40LF in Saskatoon Transit's default blue scheme, with bike rack, received from New Flyer in 2002.

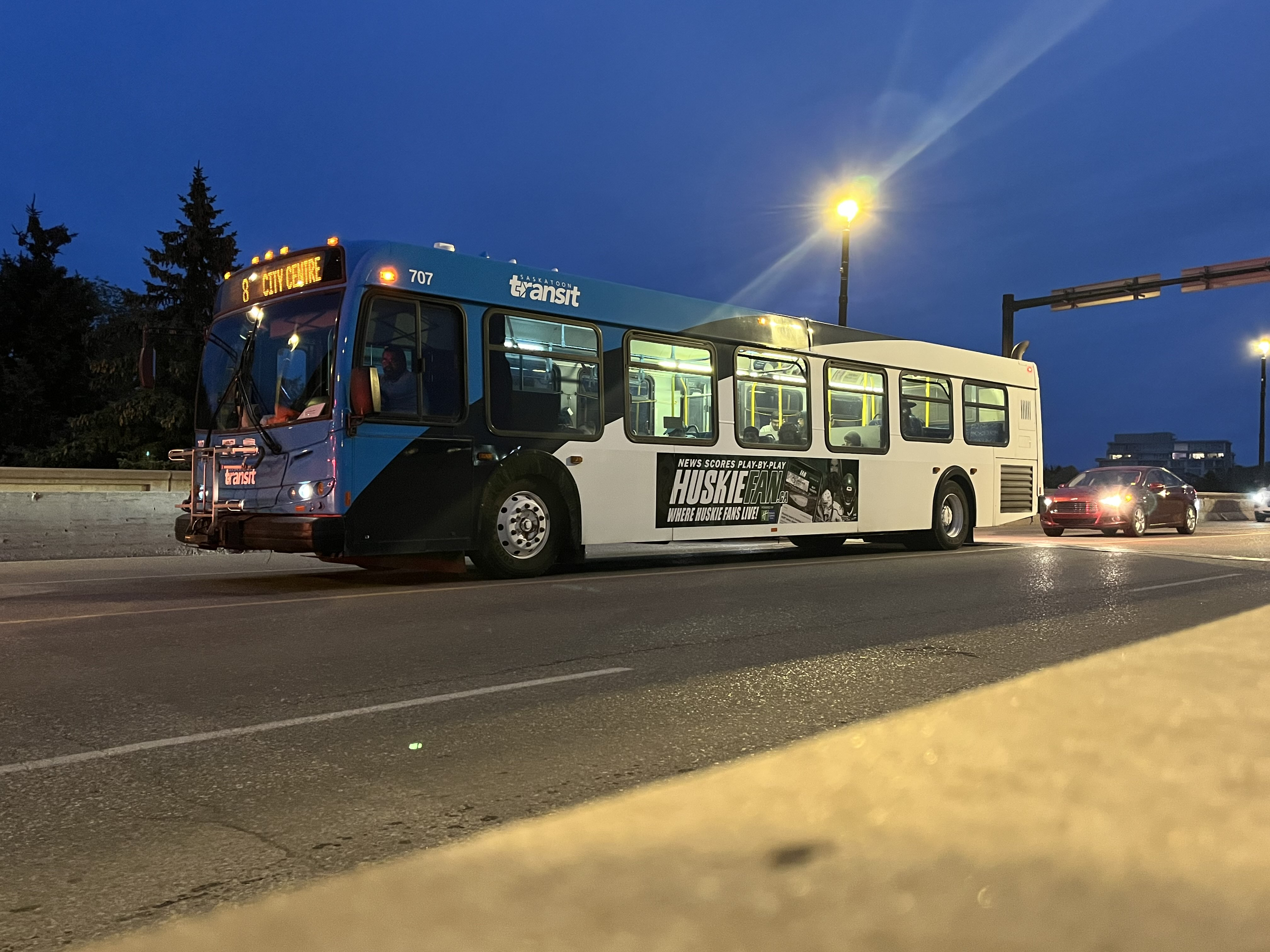
New Flyer D40LFR, painted in Saskatoon Transit's blue paint scheme, with bike rack, received in 2007 from New Flyer.

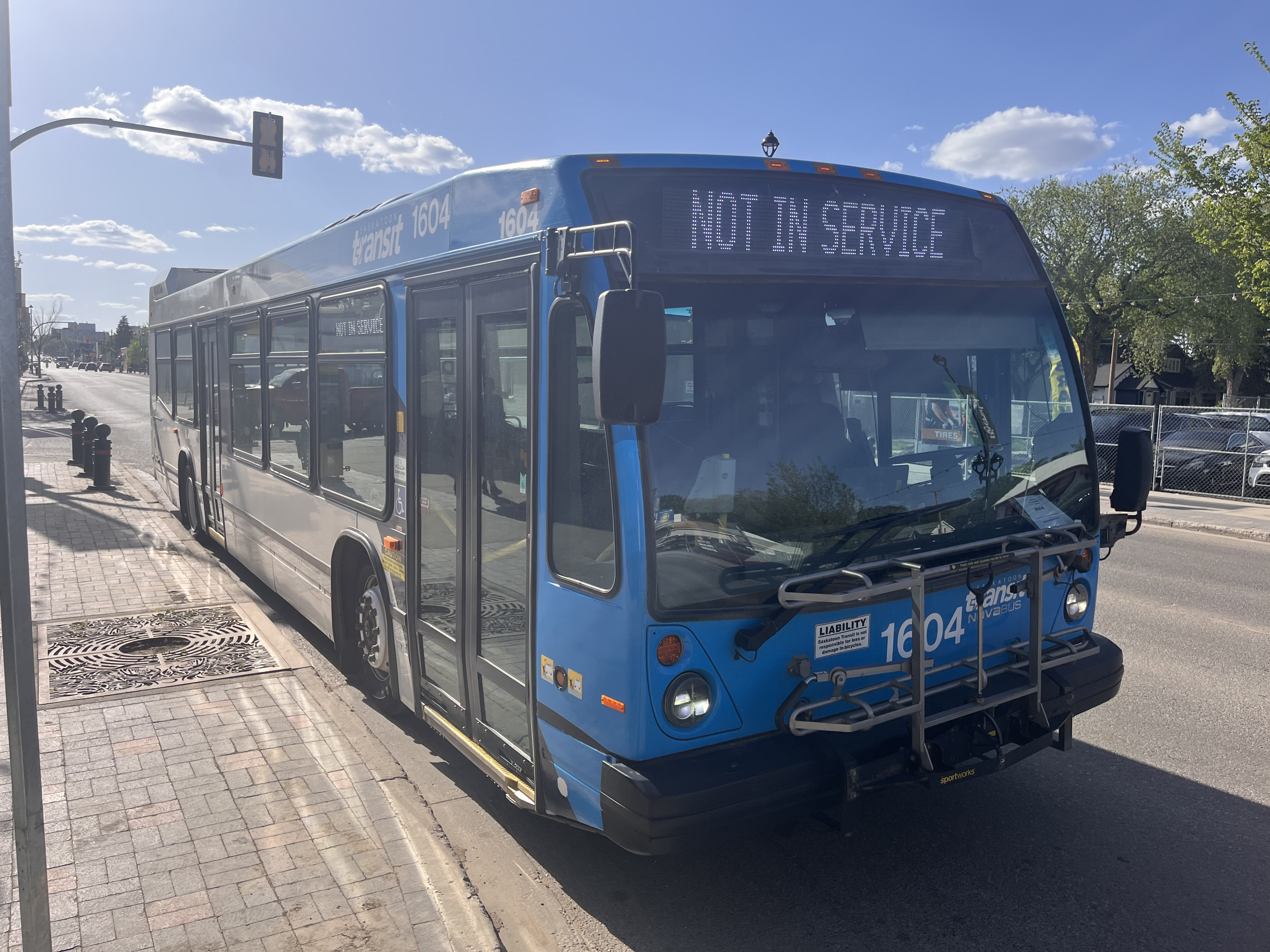
Nova Bus LFS painted in Saskatoon Transit's blue paint scheme, with bike rack, received in 2016 from Nova Bus.

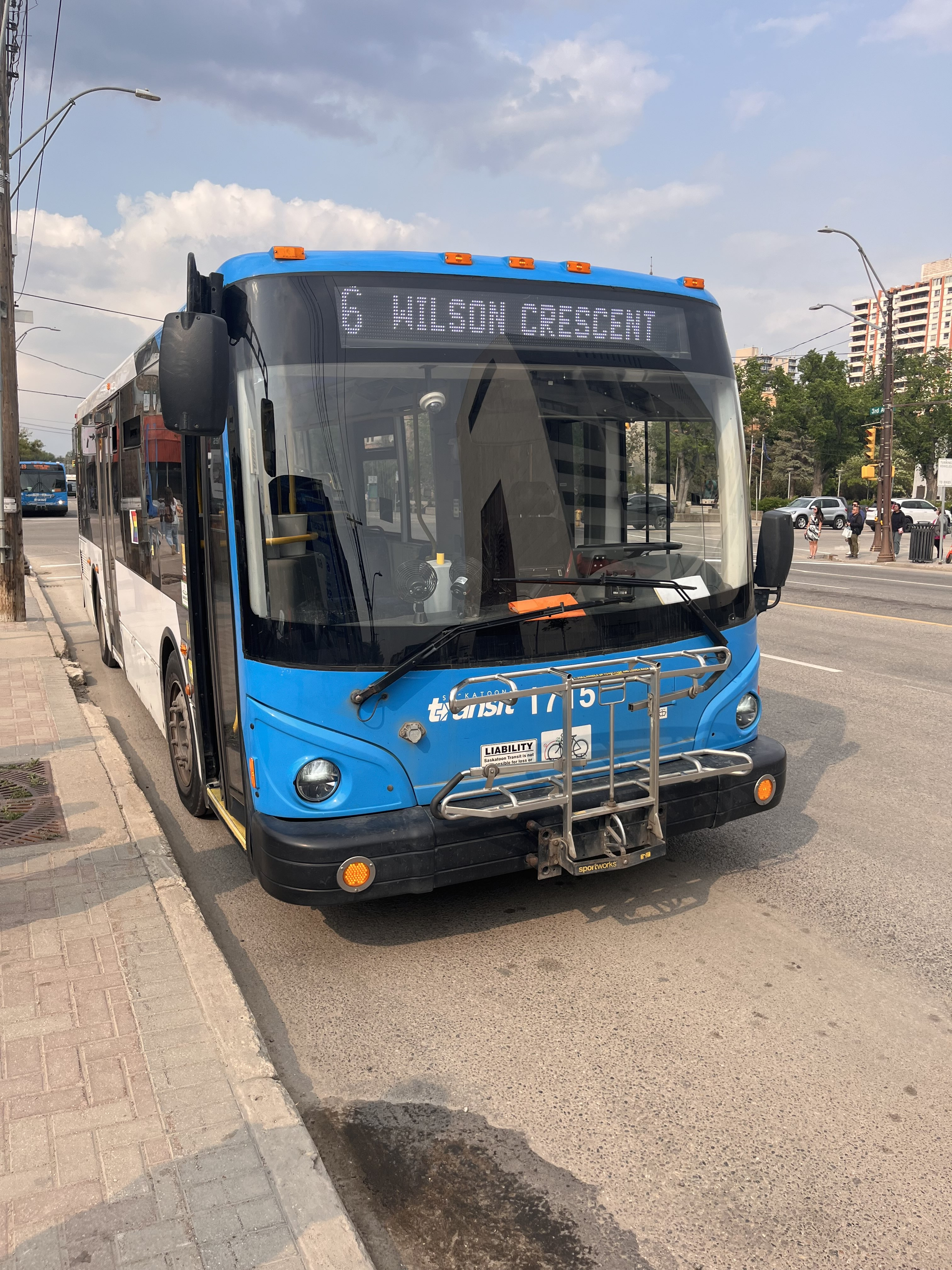
Grande West Vicinity Classic in Saskatoon Transit's blue paint scheme, with bike rack, received in 2017 from Grande West.

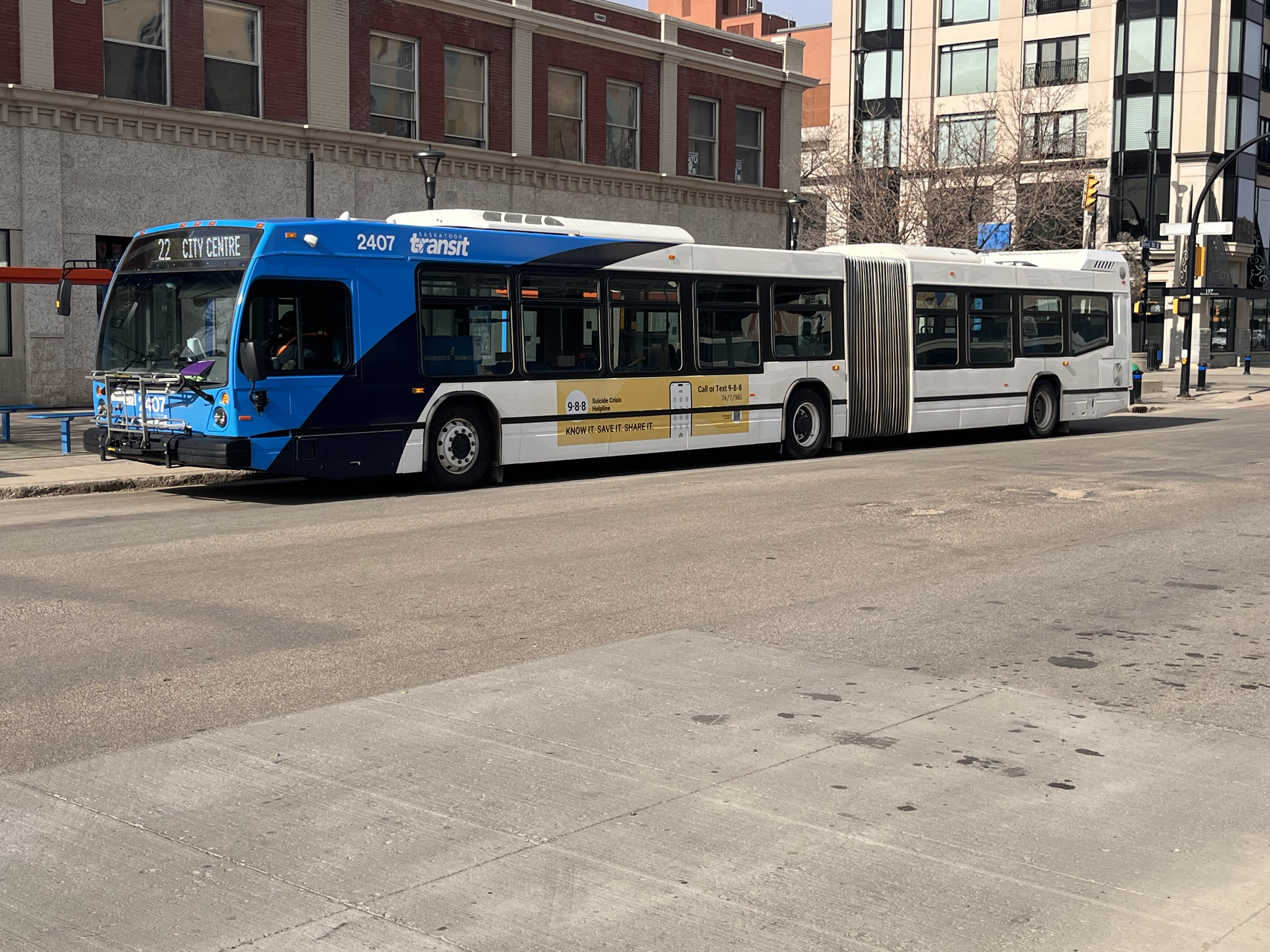
Nova Bus LFSA in Saskatoon Transit's default blue paint scheme, with bike rack, received early 2025 from Nova Bus.

== Safety Concerns ==
In recent years, many Saskatonians have expressed concern over driver and passenger safety on Saskatoon Transit buses. These concerns are largely due to an increase of misconduct on buses, including open consumption of alcohol and illegal drugs, uttering threats, physical violence, and weapons carrying, all of which are crimes in Canada. There have been numerous incidents of stabbings on Saskatoon Transit in 2025. In March 2025, a 20-year-old woman was arrested for carrying a concealed knife and for threatening a ride operator. In April 2025, a 14-year-old boy was stabbed in an attempted mugging while he was riding the bus. In May 2025, a 15-year-old girl was arrested for a non-lethal stabbing that took place on a Saskatoon Transit bus. An additional concern was bear spray attacks. In October 2024, three bear spray assaults occurred on Saskatoon Transit buses. Bear spray attacks have also occurred at or near high schools in Saskatoon, including E. D. Feehan Catholic High School in 2023 and Walter Murray Collegiate in 2025.

== See also ==
- Saskatchewan Railway Museum – Saskatoon Street Cars
- Public transport in Canada
