= Linc Johnson =

Canadian curler

- Curler
- Born: January 29, 1899; Winnipeg, Manitoba
- Died: November 8, 1970 (aged 71); Winnipeg, Manitoba

Team
- Curling club: Strathcona Curling Club
Medal record
Representing Manitoba
Macdonald Brier
Gold medal – first place	1934 Toronto

Gudjon Lincoln Johnson (January 29, 1899 – November 8, 1970) was a Canadian curler. He was the second of the 1934 Brier Champion team (skipped by his brother Leo), representing Manitoba.
