= ASF LINC =

The ASF Loan Identification Number Code (LINC) is a global identification code that can be used as a unique ID for financial accounts. Its use is specifically aimed at loans that are pooled and sold into capital markets, in order to improve the ability to track the loans throughout their life. The ID captures underlying loan type, origination date and country of origin, as well as randomized alphanumeric data. The codes are stored in a central loan data repository administered by S&P Valuation and Risk Strategies.

== See also ==
- 2008 financial crisis
