= Linx S.A. =

Brazilian technology company

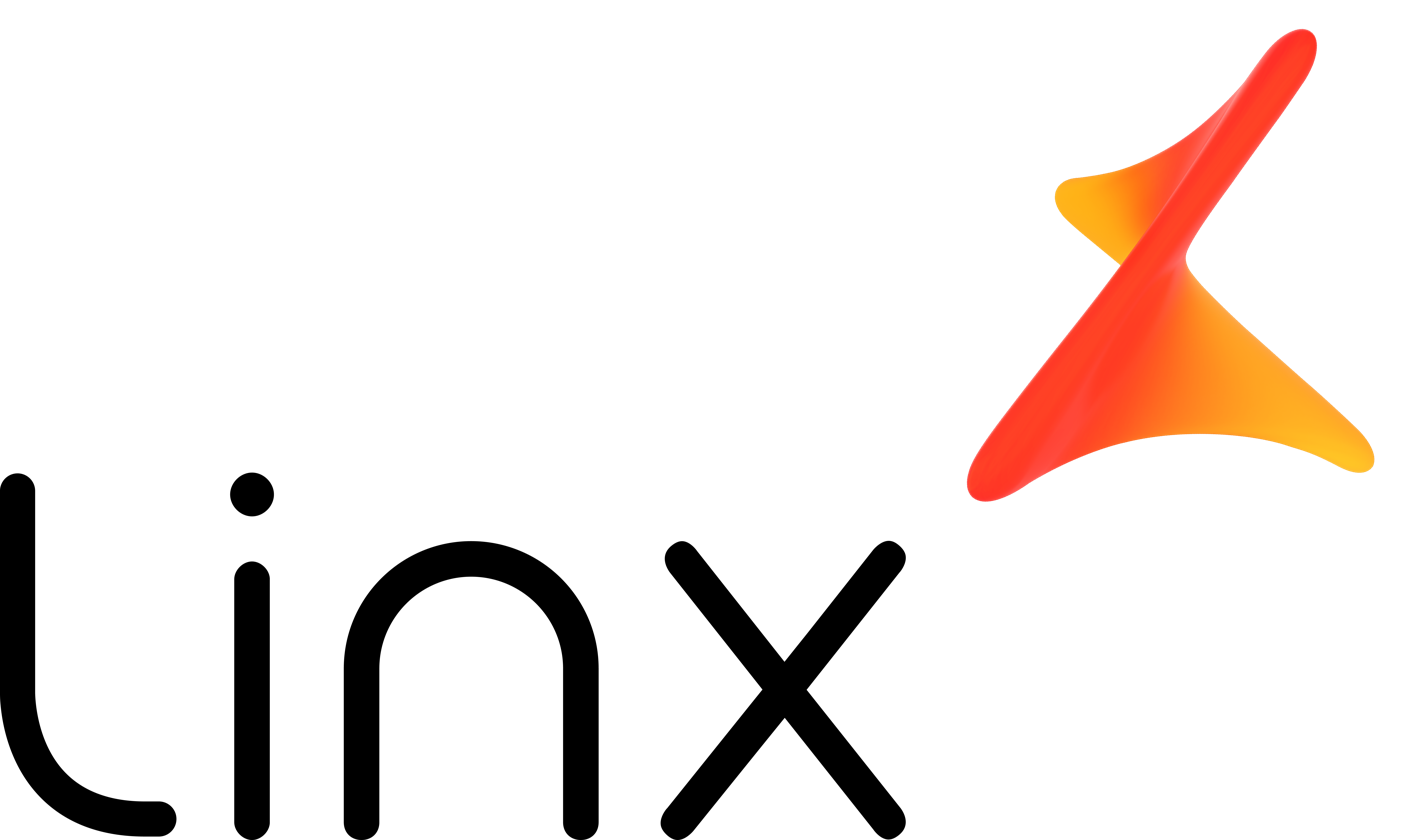
- Industry: Software
- Founded: 1985; 41 years ago
- Founder: Nércio Fernandes
- Headquarters: São Paulo, Brazil
- Number of locations: List: Rio de Janeiro (RJ); Belo Horizonte (MG); Recife (PE); Porto Alegre (RS); Joinville (SC); Bauru (SP); Cascavel (PR); Bebedouro (SP); Blumenau (SC); Uberlândia (MG); Florianópolis (SC); Manaus (AM); Miami (USA); Santiago (Chile); Huixquilucan (Mexico); Buenos Aires (Argentina); Santa Fe (Argentina)
- Area served: Brazil
- Revenue: ▲ R$495.7 million
- Net income: ▲ R$68.501 million
- Total assets: ▲ R$1.483 billion
- Owner: TOTVS
- Number of employees: 3,000
- Website: linx.com.br

Linx S.A. is a Brazilian management software company and the largest software house in retail management systems in Latin America. According to the American technology consulting firm IDC, the firm retains 40.2% of the retail management software in Brazil.

In 2007, it was listed for the 3rd time in the Valor 1000 annual report, which lists the 1000 biggest Brazilian companies. In August 2020, payment processor StoneCo merged with Linx's operations in a deal worth $1.1 billion.

On July 22, 2025, it was announced that TOTVS had completed the purchase of the company for 3.05 billion reais, practically half the amount paid by Stone to purchase it in 2020 (R$6.7 billion).

== History ==
Linx was founded in 1985 by São Paulo native, Nércio Fernandes. At age 22, Nércio dropped out of college, leaving his studies in Civil Engineering to invest in his own business in the micro-computing field. He and his partners gave the company its first name: Microserv Comércio & Consultoria Ltda.

A few years after its inauguration, the company was serving small businesses in the regions of Brás and Bom Retiro in São Paulo, when MicroMalhas was created – a software geared towards fashion retail. In 1990, the software was renamed Linx, and later became Linx ERP – the group's flagship software, geared towards different retail segments. Linx Logística, a unit specialized in internal logistics, was created in 2000. With a more complex structure, and with the parallel operation of Linx Sistemas, Linx Logística and Linx Telecom – created to focus on the outsourcing of connectivity and telecommunication options for retail – the creation of a holding company was necessary in order to unify the business units. In 2004, LMI S.A. emerged, and later was renamed Linx S.A.

In 2009, Linx received the contribution of BNDESPar to accomplish acquisitions with the objective of expanding the group's operations. With the group's expansion, a business division called Linx Prevenção de Perdas was created to minimize losses related to materials, opportunities, time and capital in several of its clients’ market verticals.

Linx relocated in 2011 to a 10-story commercial building in the city of São Paulo. Also in 2011, Linx sealed a partnership and received an investment from General Atlantic – an American private equity fund.

In 2013, Linx adhered to Novo Mercado, a segment of Bovespa that establishes transparency and governance standards through the IPO shares at BM&F. In the following year, Linx reached R$331.3 million in gross operational revenue, which represented a 27.9% increase compared to 2013.

At its 30th anniversary, in 2015, the company presented a new brand and positioning with the slogan Software that Drives Retail created by FutureBrand, agency responsible for the campaign.

In August 2020, payment processor StoneCo announced that it will be merging its business with Linx in a transaction worth $1.1 billion. Five years later, the company was acquired by the also Brazilian TOTVZ for half the amount previously paid for it.

== Mergers and acquisitions ==
In 2008, Linx acquired Quadrant Informática Ltda. for R$39.9 million.

In 2009, Linx Sistemas bought Formata Data Business, located in Belo Horizonte, MG, CSI Comércio Soluções Inteligentes Ltda. for R$41.1 million, and Intercommerce Retail Software for R$13.6 million.

A year later in 2010, the company also bought CNP Engenharia de Sistemas S.A. for R$16 million, and Dia System Informática Ltda. for R$13.8 million.

In 2011, Linx purchased Custom Business Solutions Ltda., valued at R$4.7 million, Spress Informática S.A. for R$29.8 million and Microvix Software S.A. for R$42.8 million.

In 2012, Linx Sistemas acquired Compacta Informática Ltda. for R$46.2 million.

Also in 2012, the company signed a contract for the transfer of technology with Bitix Consultoria em Tecnologia da Informação Ltda. for R$683,000.

In 2013, Linx Sistemas e Consultoria Ltda. signed a Shares Sale and Purchase Contract with the holders of the entire share capital of Direção Processamento de Dados Ltda. estimated at R$26.5 million. In the same year, the company bought Seller Corp Ltda. for R$10.1 million, Opus Software Comércio e Representações Ltda. for R$9 million, Ionics Informática e Automação Ltda. for R$12 million, and LZT Soluções em Informática Ltda. for R$30.5 million.

In 2014, Linx acquired companies such as Rezende Sistemas Ltda., Net4Biz for R$49.9 million, Big Sistemas for R$38.7 million and Softpharma for R$65 million. In the same year, Linx was part of a joint venture with Cielo. This new company was created to offer an integrated management and payment platform for Brazilian small business owners. In November of the following year, the joint venture was dissolved.

In 2015, Linx acquired NEEMU and Chaordic for R$55.98 million. In November 2016, Linx acquired Intercamp Sistemas e Comércio de Informática S/A for R$28 million. Intercamp was active in the commercialization of software development for gas stations and convenience stores. Its first international acquisition expanded the company into Latin America with the purchase of Argentinian Group Synthesis for $16.3 million in July 2017.

In October 2017, Linx acquired Shopback through its subsidiary Linx Sistemas e Consultoria. Shopback is a platform focused on retention technologies through engagement and customer recapture. It is considered to be the leading company in the Brazilian market. The transaction was worth R$39 million with an additional R$17,56 million depending on the company's financial and operational performance between 2017 and 2019.

Also in the same year, Linx acquired Percycle, technology startup and platform leader in native advertising, for R$13 million. The agreement predicted that the total value of the purchase could reach R$22.73 million in case of reaching financial and operational targets in the 3 years following the purchase.

In March 2018, Linx acquired ITEC Brazil, a company that develops and markets management and automation software for medium and large-sized pharmacies.

The second acquisition of the year occurred in April, when the company acquired the total quotas of Único Sistemas e Consultoria. With the focus on the development of multi-channel management tools and loyalty promotions, this acquisition confirms Linx's investment in systems for relationships between companies and clients.

In January 2020 Linx acquired fintech PinPag for R$135 million in cash, plus an additional R$65 million tied to the achievement of targets by 2022. The fintech was integrated into Linx Pay Hub, Linx's own payments fintech.

In 2020, Linx acquired Neemo for R$17.6 million. Owner of the Delivery App. Also in 2020, Linx announced the acquisition of Humanus, a provider of payroll management and HCM software to mid-sized companies, as well as Mercadapp, a company specializing in the supermarket sector relating to online sales.

In August 2020, Linx was bought by Brazilian fintech Stone Pagamentos, which made a BRL 6.045 billion takeover offer.
