= Link (Saskatoon) =

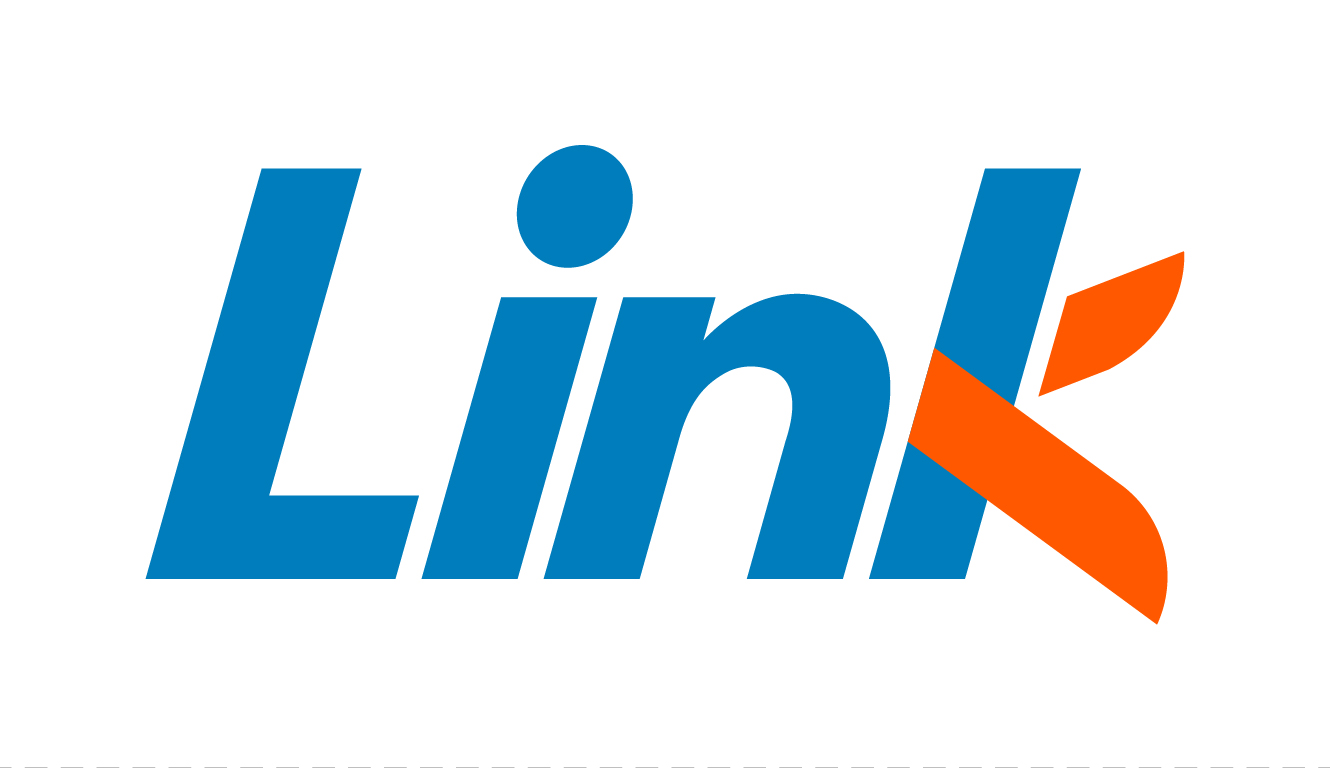

Overview
- Owner: Saskatoon Transit
- Locale: Saskatoon, Saskatchewan, Canada
- Transit type: Bus rapid transit
- Number of lines: 3
- Website: Link: Saskatoon's rapid transit project

Operation
- Operation will start: 2028; 2 years' time
System map

Link is a bus rapid transit (BRT) system under construction in Saskatoon, Saskatchewan, as part of Saskatoon Transit. There will be three lines, and it is expected to open in 2028.

== History ==
In April 2019, Saskatoon City Council approved a final design for a new bus rapid transit (BRT) system with an initial schedule of construction starting in mid-2020 and the system opening for service in 2023. However, the COVID-19 pandemic pushed back the timeline, with construction beginning in 2024 and expected to take place over three to four years. The system will run for 38 kilometres (24 mi) over 3 lines, of which 3.5 kilometres (2.2 mi) will be a dedicated right of way. It will include 48 stations (a total of 85 platforms will be built), with 3 planned for future infill, with amenities like heated shelters, real-time information displays, transit priority signals, and public art opportunities. The city also plans to build transit-oriented developments in the Confederation shopping cnetre, the University Heights shopping centre, and at the Centre Mall. This will be the first proper BRT system in Saskatchewan. In 2024, it was announced that the new BRT would be branded as Link.

== Lines ==
=== Red ===
The Red Line will run from Blairmore along 22nd Street to downtown and then crossing the South Saskatchewan River to the University of Saskatchewan and eventually to Briarwood.

=== Green ===
The western terminus will be at the Confederation Mall before also travelling on 22nd Street to the downtown core, where it will share stops with the Red Line. It will terminate in the northeast in University Heights.

=== Blue ===
The Blue Line will run north–south from Lawson Heights to Stonebridge.
