= Linq =

Linq or LINQ may refer to:

- LinQ, a Japanese girl pop music group
- Language Integrated Query, programming language technology
- The Linq, a hotel and casino in Las Vegas, United States
- Linqing, a city in China
- LINQ Ireland, a lesbian organisation in Ireland
- Linq Buslines, former Australian bus operator
