= Lesbians in Cork =

Irish lesbian community group

Lesbians in Cork (LINQ Ireland formerly LINC) is a lesbian community centered based in Cork, Ireland. They provide support services and promote equality for lesbian, bisexual, and queer women in Ireland.

== History ==
In the mid to late 1990s, the lesbian community in Cork was becoming more active with established soccer teams, softball games, pool tournaments, and walking groups. In December 1998 and February 1999, several community meetings were held to discuss the creation of a lesbian community center, and a steering group called Cairde Corcaí (Cork Friends) was formed. The original mission of the center proposed by the steering group was to 'provide a safe, accessible and secure base/resource unit through which Lesbians can develop networks for the benefit of both the individual and the Lesbian Community as a whole.'

With a £10,000 grant from the EU-sponsored Lesbian Education and Awareness project, Cairde Corcaí opened a volunteer-run lesbian center in George's Quay on April 26, 1999. In 2000, the center moved to Princes Street and was renamed Lesbians in Cork (LINC). Through the Community Employment Scheme, and funding from the Equality for Women Measure of the National Development Plan, and the Department of Justice, Equality and Law Reform, LINC was able to employ staff members, including a full-time Development worker, and to develop a three-year action plan. Early activities of the center included discos, health days, film clubs, drama groups, parent groups, and lesbian and queer studies courses. Beginning in November 2000, the center also published regular editions of a magazine.

LINC was heavily involved in activism related to same-sex marriage and parenting rights for lesbians in the 1990s and 2000s. In addition to offering lesbian parenting groups, LINC invited Susan Golombok, an expert in lesbian parenting research, to Cork to offer seminars. Angela O'Connell, on behalf on LINC, submitted a paper in support of domestic partnership and marriage rights for lesbian families to the Working Group on Domestic Partnership that had been established by the Irish Minister for Justice, Equality and Law Reform, Michael McDowell. After some LINC staff members attended a conference on the legal status of same sex couples organized by the Colley Working Group, the Gay & Lesbian Equality Network, and the Equality Authority in Dublin in 2006, they went on to organize their own conference, 'Marriage and Lesbian and Gay Families,' chaired by Ailbhe Smyth in March 2008.

In 2019, Lesbians in Cork celebrated their 20th anniversary, and remained the only resource center for exclusively lesbians and bisexual women in Ireland.

In 2024, the organization rebranded to LINQ Ireland, to acknowledge their commitment to support lesbian, bisexual, and queer women, including non-binary, transgender, and intersex people.
