= Lynx (orienteering) =

Finnish orienteering club

Lynx is a Finnish orienteering club from Kirkkonummi founded in 1971.

The world champion in sprint Mårten Boström has competed for Lynx, which he left for IFK Lidingö. The club has managed to get a fourth place in the Jukola relay twice, in 2008 (after having been first after two legs, the third and the fifth) and in 2010 (with Juuso Metsälä, Aleksi Leskinen, Antti Parjanne, Ville Keskisaari, Aapo Leskinen, Mårten Boström and Roman Rjapolov). Karoliina Sundberg was chosen to the World Championships in Miskolc in 2009.

In 1988 the club won Tiomila for the Youth in the class for men 18 year old and again in 1989.

In 1992 the club was in the leading group on the last leg in the 25-manna relay. However, it did not finish among the ten best. The club came third in the Halikko relay in 1993. The club also obtained a third place in 25-manna in 1994 after beating Sundsvalls OK.

The club got a sixth place in Jukola for the Youth in 2015. In Tiomila for the Youth the club won the relay for the 12 year old in 2018 and also in 2019. It also won the youth competition Oravatonni in 2019.
