= Susan Golombok =

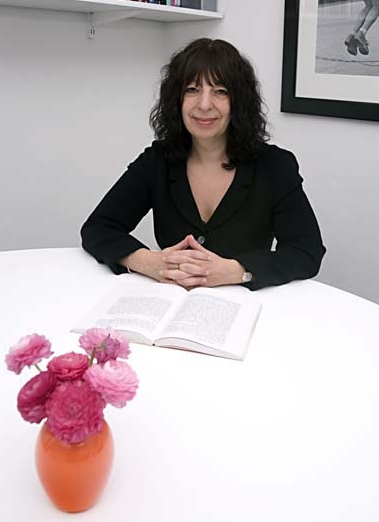
- Born: 11 August 1954 (age 72); Glasgow
- Education: Glasgow University Institute of Education, London University Institute of Psychiatry, London University
- Spouse: Prof. John Rust
- Scientific career
- Fields: New family forms Parent-child relationships Child development
- Workplaces: Institute of Psychiatry City University, London Cambridge University
- Thesis: Children in lesbian and single parent heterosexual families: Sexual identity and psychiatric state. (1982)
- Doctoral advisor: Prof. Sir Michael Rutter
- Website: https://www.psychol.cam.ac.uk/staff/professor-susan-golombok

Susan Golombok FBA FAcSS (born 11 August 1954) is Professor Emerita of Family Research and former Director of the Centre for Family Research (now the Centre for Child, Adolescent and Family Research) at the University of Cambridge. She was a Professorial Fellow at Newnham College, Cambridge from 2006-2021 where she now holds privileges of a Fellow Emerita. She is a leading expert on new family forms. Her research has contributed to theoretical understanding of family influences on child development and has addressed social and ethical issues that are of relevance to family life.

== Personal life and education ==
Golombok grew up in Glasgow, Scotland, the only child of Clara and Benzion Golombok, and attended Hutchesons' Girls' School. Following a first degree in Psychology at the University of Glasgow in 1976, Susan was awarded a master's degree in Child Development at the University of London, Institute of Education in 1977, and a PhD at the University of London, Institute of Psychiatry in 1982.

Golombok married Professor John Rust in 1979 and they have one son, Jamie Rust, born in 1985.

== Career ==
Golombok held research positions at the Institute of Psychiatry from 1977 to 1987, before being appointed to a Lectureship in Psychology at City University, London in 1987 where she established the Family and Child Psychology Research Centre. She became Professor of Family and Child Psychology in 1993. She moved to Cambridge in 2006 to take up the Chair of Family Research and the Directorship of the Centre for Family Research on the retirement of the Founder, Professor Martin Richards. In 2005, she was Visiting Professor at Columbia University, New York, and in 2019, she was Visiting Distinguished Scholar at the Williams Institute, UCLA.

== Research ==
Golombok has pioneered research on lesbian mother families, gay father families, families with transgender parents, families formed by single parents by choice, and families created by assisted reproductive technologies including in vitro fertilisation (IVF), donor insemination, egg donation and surrogacy. She conducted one of the first studies worldwide of children in lesbian mother families in the 1970s and the first study of the psychological development and wellbeing of children born by assisted reproduction in the 1980s. Her research has challenged commonly held assumptions about the social and psychological consequences for children of being raised in new family forms as well as widely held theories of child development, and has advanced theoretical understanding of parental influences on child development more generally by showing that the quality of family relationships and the social context of the family are more influential in children's psychological development than are the number, gender, gender identity, sexual orientation or biological relatedness of their parents.

Golombok has published more than 300 academic papers and authored, co-authored or edited 9 books. Modern Families: Parents and Children in New Family Forms published by Cambridge University Press, won the 2016 British Psychological Society Book Award, received an Honourable Mention in the Association of American Publishers Awards for Professional and Scholarly Excellence (PROSE) and was translated into several languages including Spanish, and Swedish.

== Impact of research on policy and legislation ==
Golombok's research has contributed to policy and legislation on new family forms nationally and internationally. She was a member of the UK government's surrogacy review committee in the late 1990s, the Nuffield Council on Bioethics Working Party on Donor Conception in 2012–13 and the International Commission on the Clinical Use of Human Germline Genome Editing in 2019-20. She has been invited to give evidence to government committees and statutory bodies including the UK Law Commission’s review of the law on surrogacy, and regulatory bodies including the Dutch State Commission on the Reassessment of Parenthood, the Swedish Government Inquiry on Surrogate Motherhood, and the French National Assembly Parliamentary Committee on Bioethics.

Her research has been used as evidence in same-sex marriage legislation in a number of countries, including the US Supreme Court ruling in 2015, and in legislation on assisted reproduction such as the UK Human Fertilisation and Embryology Act 2008 that allowed same-sex parents to be joint legal parents of children born through assisted reproduction, and the 2019 amendment that facilitated single parents becoming the legal parents of children born through surrogacy.

== Impact of research on public understanding ==
Her most recent book, We Are Family: What Really Matters for Parents and Children was published in 2020 by Scribe in the UK and as We Are Family:The Modern Transformation of Parents and Children by PublicAffairs in the US. It was quoted in articles in Time magazine,The Telegraph, New Statesman, The Psychologist, New York Times, and The Mail Online. It also featured in several podcasts and radio programmes including When Science Finds A Way, Some Families ,and The Stork and I

In 2023-24, Golombok curated an exhibition, Real Families: Stories of Change, at the Fitzwilliam Museum in Cambridge. Reviews and articles about the exhibition appeared in the national media, including The Telegraph, The Standard, and the New Scientist.

== Publications ==
=== Books ===
- Parenting: What really counts? (Routledge, 2000)
- Modern Families: Parents and Children in New Family Forms (Cambridge University Press, 2015).
- We are Family: what really matters for parents and children (Scribe, 2020)

=== Books co-authored ===
- Bottling it Up (Faber & Faber, 1985)
- Gender Development (Cambridge University Press, 1994)
- Modern Psychometrics: The Science of Psychological Assessment (Routledge, 1989)
- Growing up in a Lesbian Family (Guilford, 1997)

=== Books edited or co-edited ===
- Real Families: Stories of Change (Paul Holberton Publishing, 2023)
- Regulating Reproductive Donation with Rosamund Scott, John Appleby, Martin Richards and Stephen Wilkinson (Cambridge University Press, 2016)

=== Selected Academic Papers ===
- Golombok, S., Jones, C., Hall, P., Foley, S., Imrie, S., & Jadva, V. (2023). A longitudinal study of families formed through third-party assisted reproduction: Mother-child relationships and child adjustment from infancy to adulthood. Developmental Psychology. https://doi.org/10.1037/dev0001526
- Golombok, S. (2021). Love and truth: What really matters for children born through third-party assisted reproduction. Child Development Perspectives, 15(2), 103-109. doi.org/10.1111/cdep.12406
- Golombok, S., Ilioi, E., Blake, L., Roman, G., & Jadva, V. (2017). A longitudinal study of families formed through reproductive donation: Parent-adolescent relationships and adolescent adjustment at age 14. Developmental Psychology, 53(10), 1966-1977. dx.doi.org/10.1037/dev0000372.
- Golombok, S., Blake, L., Slutsky, J., Raffanello, E., Roman, G., & Ehrhardt, A. (2017). Parenting and the adjustment of children born to gay fathers through surrogacy. Child Development, 89(4), 1223-1233. DOI:10.1111/cdev.12728.
- Golombok, S., Mellish, L., Jennings, S., Casey, P., Tasker, F. & Lamb, M. (2014) Adoptive gay father families: Parent-child relationships and children’s psychological adjustment. Child Development, 85, No. 2, 456-468. doi: 10.1111/cdev.12155
- Golombok, S., Casey, P., Readings, J., Blake, L., Marks, A. & Jadva, V. (2011) Families created through surrogacy: Mother-child relationships and children’s psychological adjustment at age 7. Developmental Psychology, 47, No. 6, 1579-1578.
- Golombok, S., Murray, C., Jadva, V., MacCallum, F.& Lycett, E. (2004) Families created through surrogacy arrangements: Parent-child relationships in the first year of life. Developmental Psychology, 40, 400-411.
- Golombok, S., Perry, B., Burston, A., Murray, C., Mooney-Somers, J., Stevens, M. & Golding, J. (2003) Children with lesbian parents: A community study. Developmental Psychology, 39, No. 1, 20-33.
- Golombok, S., MacCallum, F., Goodman, E. & Rutter, M. (2002) Families with children conceived by donor insemination: A follow-up at age 12. Child Development, 73, No 3, 952-968.
- Golombok, S., MacCallum, & Goodman, E. (2001). The "test-tube" generation: Parent-child relationships and the psychological well-being of IVF children at adolescence. Child Development, 72, No 2, 599-608.
- Golombok, S. & Tasker, F. (1996) Do parents influence the sexual orientation of their children? Findings from a longitudinal study of lesbian families. Developmental Psychology, 32, No 1, 3-11.
- Golombok, S., Cook, R., Bish, A. & Murray, C. (1995) Families created by the new reproductive technologies: Quality of parenting and social and emotional development of the children. Child Development, 64, No 2, 285-298.
- Golombok, S., Spencer, A. & Rutter, M. (1983) Children in lesbian and single parent households: Psychosexual and psychiatric appraisal. Journal of Child Psychology & Psychiatry, 24, No 4, 551‑572.
