= Lince =

Lince may refer to:

Military vehicles

- Lince (tank), a Spanish main battle tank in the 1990s
- Lince (armored car), an Italian World War II armored car
- Breda Ba.88 Lince, an Italian World War II ground-attack aircraft
- VTLM Lince, the Italian name for the Iveco LMV tactical vehicle

Other uses

- Lince (spacecraft), an under development spacecraft by PLD Space
- Lince District, a district of Lima
- Lince Dorado, a Puerto Rican professional wrestler
- Lince Railway, short for Linhe–Ceke Railway in China's Inner Mongolia

== See also ==
- Lynx
