= Saskatchewan Highway 45 =

Provincial highway in Saskatchewan, Canada

Highway 45
- Highway 45 highlighted in red
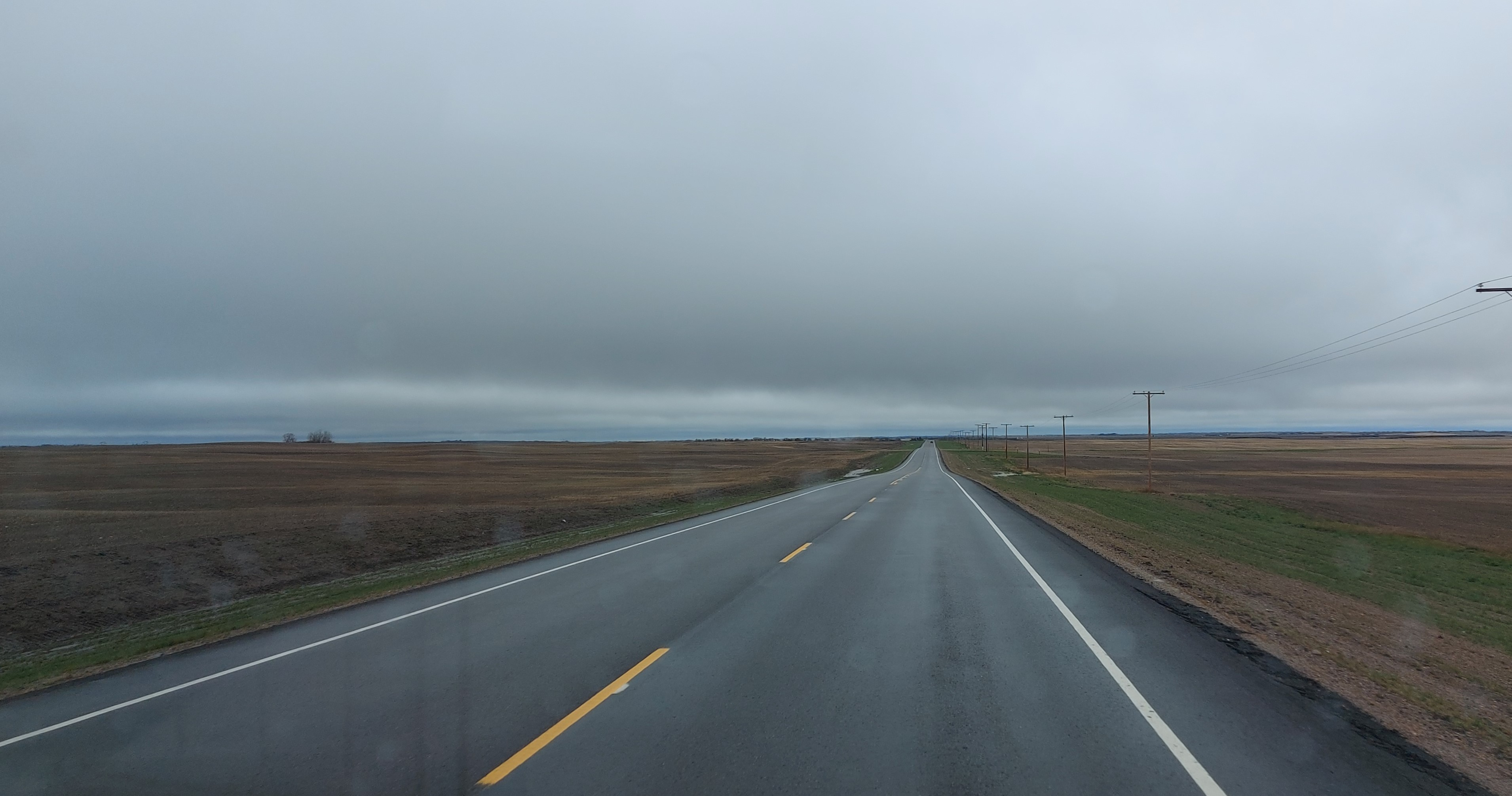
- Highway 45 near Macrorie

Route information
- Maintained by Ministry of Highways and Infrastructure
- Length: 115.5 km (71.8 mi)

Major junctions
- South end: Highway 42 at Lucky Lake
- Highway 44 at Macrorie; Highway 15 near Outlook
- North end: Highway 7 near Delisle

Location
- Country: Canada
- Province: Saskatchewan
- Rural municipalities: Canaan, Coteau, Fertile Valley, Montrose, Vanscoy

Highway system
- Provincial highways in Saskatchewan
← Highway 44	→ Highway 46

Highway 45 is a north–south provincial highway in the Canadian province of Saskatchewan. It runs from Highway 42 at Lucky Lake to Highway 7 near Delisle. The highway is about 116 kilometres (72 mi) long.

Highway 45 passes near the communities of Lucky Lake, Tullis, Birsay, Lyons, Macrorie, Swanson, Donavon, and Delisle.

== Route description ==
Highway 45 begins in the Rural Municipality of Canaan No. 225 in the village of Lucky Lake at an intersection with Highway 42, just across the railway tracks from that highway's intersection with Highway 646. It heads north along the west side of town, passing along the edge of its business district, before curving northeast to pass through neighbourhoods and by the Lucky Lake Airport. The highway then leaves Lucky Lake, running parallel to a rail line as it enters the Rural Municipality of Coteau No. 255, travelling through the hamlets of Tullis and Birsay, where it has intersections with Highway 646, Township Road 250 (provides access to Hitchcock Bay), and Highway 373 as it curves due north and crosses the railway. Highway 45 travels through rural farmland for the next several kilometres, having an intersection with Township Road 262 (provides access to both Dunblane and Coteau Beach) before becoming concurrent (overlapped) with westbound Highway 44 just west of Gardiner Dam, with the pair crossing into the Rural Municipality of Fertile Valley No. 285.

Highway 44 and Highway 45 curve northwest past Tichfield and Coteau Lake to reach the village of Macrorie, where Highway 44 splits off and heads west while Highway 45 continues north, paralleling the west bank of the South Saskatchewan River as it travels past Bratton (accessed via Township Road 284) to share a very short concurrency with Highway 15, just across the river from the town of Outlook. It now travels just to the east of Conquest (accessed via Township Road 300) and Ardath (accessed via Township Road 310, former Highway 654) to cross into the Rural Municipality of Montrose No. 315 by way of a switchback. The highway passes through Swanson before having an intersection with O'Malley Road (provides access to Gledhow, Valley Park, and Pike Lake / Pike Lake Provincial Park) and travelling just to the west of Donavon (can accessed via either Township Road 330 or Second Street N). Now travelling through several kilometres of rural farmland, Highway 45 enters both the Rural Municipality of Vanscoy No. 345 and the town of Delisle, where it comes to an end on the town's south side at an intersection with Highway 7 shortly after crossing a railway. The entire length of Highway 45 is a paved, two-lane highway.

== Major intersections ==
From south to north:

Rural municipality	Location	km	mi	Destinations	Notes
Canaan No. 225	Lucky Lake	0.0	0.0	Highway 42 – Riverhurst, Dinsmore	Adjacent to Highway 646 intersection
Coteau No. 255	Birsay	17.6	10.9	Highway 646 west / Township Road 250 – Hitchcock Bay	
Coteau No. 255	Birsay	18.4	11.4	Highway 373 south – Hitchcock Bay, Riverhurst Ferry	
Coteau No. 255	Lineville	30.5	19.0	Township Road 262 – Dunblane, Coteau Beach	
Coteau No. 255	Phillips	37.3	23.2	Highway 44 east – Gardiner Dam, Davidson	South end of Highway 44 concurrency
Fertile Valley No. 285	Macrorie	47.6	29.6	Highway 44 west – Dinsmore, Elrose	North end of Highway 44 concurrency
Fertile Valley No. 285	McQueen Mills	60.1	37.3	Bratton Road (Township Road 284) – Bratton	
Fertile Valley No. 285	Vineland	64.5	40.1	Highway 15 east – Outlook, Kenaston	South end of Highway 15 concurrency
Fertile Valley No. 285		66.1	41.1	Highway 15 west – Rosetown	North end of Highway 15 concurrency
Fertile Valley No. 285		72.6	45.1	Township Road 300 – Conquest	
↑ / ↓		82.2	51.1	Township Road 310 – Ardath	Former Highway 654 south
Montrose No. 315	Swanson	90.5	56.2	Main Street – Swanson	
Montrose No. 315		91.9	57.1	O'Malley Road (Township Road 320) – Gledhow, Valley Park, Pike Lake Provincial Park	
Montrose No. 315		101.6	63.1	W Government Road (Township Road 330) – Donavon	
Montrose No. 315		102.4	63.6	Second Street N – Donavon	
Vanscoy No. 345	Delisle	115.5	71.8	Highway 7 – Rosetown, Calgary, Saskatoon	
1.000 mi = 1.609 km; 1.000 km = 0.621 mi: Concurrency terminus

== See also ==
- Transportation in Saskatchewan
- Roads in Saskatchewan
