= Alfred Gleave =

Canadian politician

Alfred Pullen Gleave
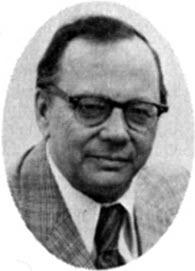

Member of Parliament for Saskatoon—Biggar
- In office June 25, 1968 – May 9, 1974
- Preceded by: first member, riding created in 1966
- Succeeded by: Ray Hnatyshyn

Personal details
- Born: June 6, 1911 Embro, Oxford County, Ontario, Canada
- Died: August 19, 1999 (aged 88) Ottawa, Ontario, Canada
- Party: NDP
- Spouse: Marry May
- Profession: Farmer, Seed Grower

Alfred Pullen Gleave (June 6, 1911 – August 19, 1999) was a Member of Parliament for Saskatoon—Biggar, Canada from 25 June 1968 to 9 May 1974. He was a farmer and grain grower, and became an outspoken agricultural advocate. He was born in Ontario, and educated in one room school houses in Saskatchewan. Turning 19 at the start of the 1930s, he understood the many difficulties farmers faced during this era of drought and Depression. He also lived through farming advances, technological changes and industrial revolution of the 1940s and 1950s which followed World War II. In the early 20th century, Gleave helped to establish many varied agricultural organizations. As a member of the New Democratic Party (NDP), he became a Member of Parliament on two occasions. Gleave served as an Agriculture Committee member. He was inducted into the Saskatchewan Agricultural Hall of Fame.

== Early education ==
His father, William Gleave, successfully proved up his homestead at SW 24 TWP 32 R.7 W3.

Elementary schooling was completed at a one-room school house in Swanson (SE 1/4 Sec.36, Twp.31, R.9, W3) as well as at Donavon. This was followed by secondary schooling at a high school in Perdue.

== Agricultural history ==
His family moved from Oxford County, Ontario, in 1918 to the Swanson area. He was involved in number of community farm organizations including the United Farmers of Canada Saskatchewan section, Saskatchewan Farmers Union, (SFU), Interprovincial Farm Union Council, Canadian Federation of Agriculture (CFA), National Farmers Union (NFA), Canadian Wheat Board and he was a representative at the International Wheat Agreement negotiations.

During his time with the United Farmers of Canada, the Dominion Government desired wheat economy stability and negotiated the British Wheat Agreement of 1946 which provided for British purchases of large amounts of Canadian wheat at prices considerably below the world market. Gleave was one of those who advocated for a farmers' nondelivery strike.

== Awards ==
As a strong voice for the agricultural community, he has been inducted posthumously 2000 into the Saskatchewan Agricultural Hall of Fame.

== Political history ==
Gleave was successful in two elections for the Saskatoon—Biggar federal electoral district as a candidate of the New Democratic Party (NDP) which he joined November 8, 1965. The NDP won a total of 22 seats in the 1968 election Gleave was elected in the Saskatoon—Biggar federal electoral district on June 25, 1968, and again on October 30, 1972. During 1972 election the NDP won a total of 31 seats.

However Gleave started out representing the NDP in the Rosetown—Biggar federal electoral district in the 1965 election held November 8, 1965. At this time he lost to Ron D. McLelland of the Progressive Conservative Party (PC Party).

Following this defeat, Gleave was successful twice in the Saskatoon—Biggar federal electoral district in the 1968 election and the 1972 election.

He tried again in the 1974 election representing the NDP party in Saskatoon—Biggar, however was defeated by Ray Hnatyshyn of the PC Party.

He later moved to the Kindersley—Lloydminster federal electoral district and lost to Bill McKnight (PC Party) in the 1979 election.

== Member of Parliament ==
The 28th Canadian Parliament was set up September 12, 1968, and was controlled by a Liberal Party majority under Prime Minister Pierre Trudeau. He was member of both the agriculture committee as well as the Library of Parliament joint committee.

The 29th Canadian Parliament set up October 30, 1972, and was again controlled by a Liberal Party minority under Trudeau. Here he was member of the Trends in Food Prices, agriculture committee, and the Finance, Trade and Economic Affairs committee. He also was a special member of the Restaurant joint committee.

Preceded by first member, riding created in 1966	Member of Parliament for Saskatoon—Biggar; 1968–1974	Succeeded by Ray Hnatyshyn PC

== Published works ==
During his retirement years, he wrote a book about politics and farm organization, United We Stand, Prairie Farmers 1901–1975. He died in Ottawa on August 19, 1999.
