= Swanson, Saskatchewan =

Community in Saskatchewan, Canada

Coordinates: 51°41′39″N 107°08′15″W

Location of Swanson in Saskatchewan

Swanson is a hamlet in the Rural Municipality of Montrose No. 315, Saskatchewan, Canada. The hamlet is located southwest of Saskatoon along Highway 45 along the Canadian National Railway, Delisle–Tichfield Junction stub.

== Notable people ==
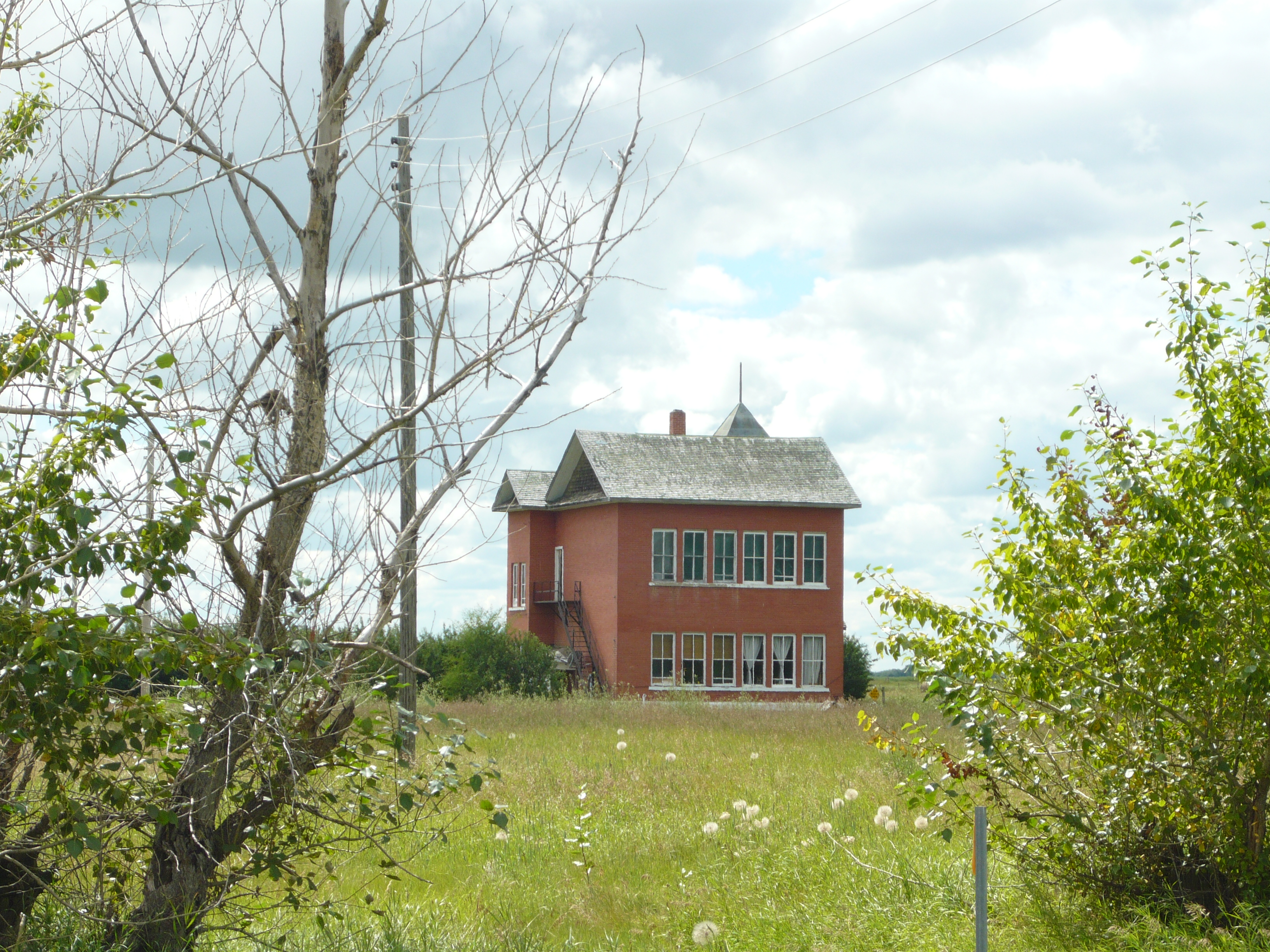
Former school in Swanson

- Alfred Gleave, a Member of Parliament for Saskatoon—Biggar, Canada from 25 June 1968 to 9 May 1974.

== See also ==
- List of communities in Saskatchewan
- List of hamlets in Saskatchewan
