= Rural Municipality of Coteau No. 255 =

Rural municipality in Saskatchewan, Canada

Coteau No. 255
- Rural municipality
- Rural Municipality of Coteau No. 255

- Location of the RM of Coteau No. 255 in Saskatchewan
- Coordinates: 51.151°N 106.885°W
- Country: Canada
- Province: Saskatchewan
- Census division: 7
- SARM division: 3
- Formed: December 12, 1910

Government
  - Reeve: Terry Sieffert
  - Governing body: RM of Coteau No. 255 Council
  - Administrator: Lindsay Hargrave
  - Office location: Birsay

Area (2016)
  - Land: 899.27 km^{2} (347.21 sq mi)

Population (2016)
  - Total: 475
  - Density: 0.5/km^{2} (1.3/sq mi)
- Time zone: CST
  - Summer (DST): CST
- Area codes: 306 and 639

The Rural Municipality of Coteau No. 255 (2016 population: 475) is a rural municipality (RM) in the Canadian province of Saskatchewan within Census Division No. 7 and SARM Division No. 3.

== History ==
The RM of Coteau No. 255 incorporated as a rural municipality on December 12, 1910.

== Geography ==
The RM's eastern boundary runs along the shore of Lake Diefenbaker.

=== Communities and localities ===
The following urban municipalities are surrounded by the RM.

Resort villages

- Coteau Beach

The following unincorporated communities are within the RM.

Organized hamlets

- Hitchcock Bay

Localities

- Birsay
- Dunblane
- Lyons
- Tichfield Junction
- Tullis

== Demographics ==
Population history (1981–2016)
Year	Pop.	±%
1981	622	—
1986	592	−4.8%
1991	529	−10.6%
1996	475	−10.2%
2001	458	−3.6%
2006	468	+2.2%
2011	420	−10.3%
2016	475	+13.1%
Source: Statistics Canada via Saskatchewan Bureau of Statistics

In the 2021 Census of Population conducted by Statistics Canada, the RM of Coteau No. 255 had a population of 401 living in 183 of its 381 total private dwellings, a change of −15.6% from its 2016 population of 475. With a land area of 895.72 km^{2} (345.84 sq mi), it had a population density of 0.4/km^{2} (1.2/sq mi) in 2021.

In the 2016 Census of Population, the RM of Coteau No. 255 recorded a population of 475 living in 186 of its 318 total private dwellings, a 13.1% change from its 2011 population of 420. With a land area of 899.27 km^{2} (347.21 sq mi), it had a population density of 0.5/km^{2} (1.4/sq mi) in 2016.

== Attractions ==
- Gardiner Dam
- Lucky Lake Heritage Marsh
- Hitchcock's Hideaway Archaeological Field School
- Hitchcock Cabin
- Elbow Harbour Provincial Recreation Site
- Elbow Museum / Mistusinne Cairns

== Government ==
The RM of Coteau No. 255 is governed by an elected municipal council and an appointed administrator that meets on the second Monday of every month. The reeve of the RM is Terry Sieffert while its administrator is Lindsay Hargrave. The RM's office is located in Birsay.

== Transportation ==
- Saskatchewan Highway 44
- Saskatchewan Highway 45
- Saskatchewan Highway 373
- Saskatchewan Highway 646
- Big Sky Rail (AGT Foods)
- Lucky Lake Airport

== See also ==
- List of rural municipalities in Saskatchewan
