= John Hnatyshyn =

Canadian politician (1907–1967)

The Honourable John Hnatyshyn QC

Canadian Senator from Saskatchewan
- In office January 15, 1959 – May 2, 1967
- Appointed by: Vincent Massey (on the advice of John Diefenbaker)
- Succeeded by: Sidney Labe Buckwold

Personal details
- Born: January 20, 1907 Vashkivtsi, Duchy of Bukovina, Austro-Hungarian Empire (now Chernivtsi Oblast, Ukraine)
- Died: May 2, 1967 (aged 60)
- Party: Progressive Conservative
- Other political affiliations: Saskatchewan Progressive Conservative
- Spouse: Helen Constance Pitts (m. 1931)
- Children: 4, including Ramon
- Education: University of Saskatchewan
- Profession: lawyer

John Hnatyshyn QC (/nəˈtɪʃən/ nə-TISH-ən; Ukrainian: Іва́н Миха́йлович Гнати́шин, romanized: Iván Mykháylovych Hnatýshyn, IPA: [iˈwɑn mɪˈxɑjlowɪdʒ ɦnɐˈtɪʃɪn]; January 20, 1907 – May 2, 1967) was a Ukrainian Canadian lawyer, Senator and father of Ray Hnatyshyn, the twenty-fourth governor general of Canada.

== Early life and career ==
Born in the mostly Ukrainian northern part of the Austro-Hungarian Duchy of Bukovina, the son of Michael and Anna, Hnatyshyn came to Canada when he was two months old. Raised on a farm near Canora, Saskatchewan, he received a Bachelor of Arts degree in 1930 and a Bachelor of Law degree in 1932 from the University of Saskatchewan. He was called to the Saskatchewan bar in 1933 and practised law in Saskatoon, co-founding the firm of Kyle, Ferguson and Hnatyshyn in 1942 and becoming Queen's Counsel in 1957.

While attending university in Saskatoon, he resided at the Petro Mohyla Ukrainian Institute, where he met Helen Pitts. They married in 1931 and had four children: Ramon, Victor, David and Elizabeth.

== Political career ==
In the 1935, 1940 and 1945 federal elections, he tried unsuccessfully to get elected to the House of Commons of Canada as a Conservative candidate for the riding of Yorkton. (Note: He ran in 1935 as part of the original Conservative Party of Canada. That party contested the 1940 election under the "National Government" moniker, then became the Progressive Conservative Party of Canada in 1942.) He also ran unsuccessfully for the provincial legislature as a Progressive Conservative candidate for Saskatoon City in 1952.

In 1959, he was appointed by John Diefenbaker to the Senate representing the senatorial division of Saskatoon, Saskatchewan, becoming Canada's first Ukrainian-born senator. (Note: Canada's first senator of Ukrainian descent, William Michael Wall, was born in Manitoba.) He died in office in 1967.
