= Ray Hnatyshyn =

Governor General of Canada from 1990 to 1995

The Right Honourable Ray Hnatyshyn PC CC CMM CD QC (Can) QC (Sask) FRHSC(hon)

24th Governor General of Canada
- In office January 29, 1990 – February 8, 1995
- Monarch: Elizabeth II
- Prime Minister: Brian Mulroney; Kim Campbell; Jean Chrétien
- Preceded by: Jeanne Sauvé
- Succeeded by: Roméo LeBlanc

Minister of Justice and Attorney General
- In office June 30, 1986 – December 7, 1988
- Prime Minister: Brian Mulroney
- Preceded by: John Crosbie
- Succeeded by: Joe Clark (acting); Doug Lewis

President of the Privy Council
- In office February 27, 1985 – June 30, 1986
- Prime Minister: Brian Mulroney
- Preceded by: Erik Nielsen
- Succeeded by: Don Mazankowski

Minister of Energy, Mines and Resources
- In office June 4, 1979 – March 3, 1980
- Prime Minister: Joe Clark
- Preceded by: Alastair Gillespie
- Succeeded by: Marc Lalonde

Member of Parliament for Saskatoon West Saskatoon—Biggar (1974–1979)
- In office July 8, 1974 – November 21, 1988
- Preceded by: Alfred Gleave
- Succeeded by: Riding abolished

Chancellor of Carleton University
- In office November 2002 – December 18, 2002
- Preceded by: Arthur Kroeger
- Succeeded by: Marc Garneau

Personal details
- Born: Ramon John Hnatyshyn; March 16, 1934 Saskatoon, Saskatchewan, Canada
- Died: December 18, 2002 (aged 68) Ottawa, Ontario, Canada
- Resting place: Beechwood Cemetery
- Party: Progressive Conservative
- Spouse: Gerda Nygaard Andreasen (m. 1960)
- Children: John, Carl
- Parent: John Hnatyshyn (father)
- Education: University of Saskatchewan (BA, LLB)
- Occupation: Lawyer; politician

Military service
- Allegiance: Canada
- Branch: Royal Canadian Air Force Reserve
- Service years: 1951–1956
- Unit: 23 Wing Auxiliary

Ramon John "Ray" Hnatyshyn (/nəˈtɪʃən/ nə-TISH-ən; March 16, 1934 – December 18, 2002) was a Canadian lawyer and statesman who served as the 24th governor general of Canada from 1990 to 1995.

Hnatyshyn was born and educated in Saskatchewan and served in the Royal Canadian Air Force prior to being elected to the House of Commons in 1974. On June 4, 1979, Hnatyshyn was sworn into the Queen's Privy Council for Canada and served as a minister of the Crown in two non-successive governments until 1988.

He was appointed governor general by Queen Elizabeth II in 1989, on the recommendation of Prime Minister Brian Mulroney. He replaced Jeanne Mathilde Sauvé as viceroy, and occupied the post until succeeded by Roméo LeBlanc in 1995. As the Queen's representative, Hnatyshyn followed an egalitarian approach by reversing some exclusive policies of his predecessors, such as by opening up Rideau Hall to ordinary Canadians and tourists alike, and was praised for raising the stature of Ukrainian Canadians.

He subsequently practiced law and sat as Chancellor of Carleton University before dying of pancreatitis on December 18, 2002.

== Early life and career ==
Hnatyshyn, a Ukrainian Canadian, was born in Saskatoon, Saskatchewan, to Helen Constance (Pitts) and John Hnatyshyn. John practised as a lawyer, but also became involved in politics, running unsuccessfully in three federal elections in the riding of Yorkton before becoming Canada's first Ukrainian-born senator in 1959. (Note: John Hnatyshyn was born in Bukovina, then a part of Austria-Hungary. Canada's first senator of Ukrainian descent, William Michael Wall, was born in Manitoba.) John's political links and friendship with John Diefenbaker, the future prime minister, would provide his son with frequent exposure to high-calibre political debate.

Ray Hnatyshyn attended Victoria Public School and Nutana Collegiate Institute in Saskatoon, then went on to study at the University of Saskatchewan, earning a Bachelor of Arts in 1954, and a Bachelor of Laws two years later. He was called to the bar of Saskatchewan in 1957 and briefly worked at a Saskatoon law firm, then moved to Ottawa in 1958 to take a position as an assistant to Walter Aseltine, the Government Leader in the Canadian Senate.

Hnatyshyn returned to Saskatoon in 1960 and resumed his career as a lawyer. That year, on January 9, he married Karen Gerda Nygaard Andreasen, eventually having and raising two sons with her. In the 1964 Saskatchewan general election, he ran unsuccessfully as a Progressive Conservative Party of Saskatchewan candidate in the electoral district of Saskatoon City. In 1966 he began teaching at the University of Saskatchewan's College of Law as a sessional lecturer, and in 1973 he was appointed Queen's Counsel in Saskatchewan.

In his youth, Hnatyshyn enrolled in the Royal Canadian Air Cadets, where he was a member of 107 Spitfire Squadron in Saskatoon. He was enlisted as a reservist with the Royal Canadian Air Force (RCAF) from 1951 to 1956, then served in the RCAF's 23 Wing (Auxiliary) from 1956 to 1958.

== Member of Parliament ==
In the 1974 federal election, Hnatyshyn ran as a Progressive Conservative Party (PC) candidate and narrowly won the riding of Saskatoon—Biggar against New Democratic Party incumbent Alfred Gleave. He thereby became a member of Parliament (MP). He was appointed the PCs' deputy house leader in 1976.

When Saskatoon—Biggar was abolished ahead of the 1979 election, Hnatyshyn followed most of his constituents into the newly established riding of Saskatoon West, where he won re-election. The PCs won a minority government in that election, and Hnatyshyn was appointed on June 4 to the Cabinet chaired by Joe Clark as Minister of Energy, Mines, and Resources, as well as Minister of State for Science and Technology.

The PC minority government fell in December 1979, and the Liberals regained power in the subsequent federal election held on February 18, 1980. Hnatyshyn was re-elected MP in Saskatoon West, and was named opposition critic for justice. Brian Mulroney replaced Joe Clark as PC leader following the 1983 leadership election, and named Hnatyshyn Opposition House Leader in April 1984.

The PCs won a landslide majority government in the 1984 federal election, and Hnatyshyn was named Government House Leader in November 1984, before adding President of the Privy Council to his portfolio in February 1985. By mid-1986, as the PCs began to trail the Liberals in opinion polling, Mulroney announced a cabinet shuffle, naming Hnatyshyn Minister of Justice and Attorney General of Canada on June 30. He was called to the bar of Ontario the same year, and was appointed Queen's Counsel in Canada in 1988.

Saskatoon West was abolished before the election of 1988, and Hnatyshyn attempted to follow most of his constituents into Saskatoon—Clark's Crossing, but lost to NDP challenger Chris Axworthy. Following his defeat, Hnatyshyn returned to practising law, joining the Ottawa firm of Gowling, Strathy & Henderson in April 1989.

== Governor General of Canada ==
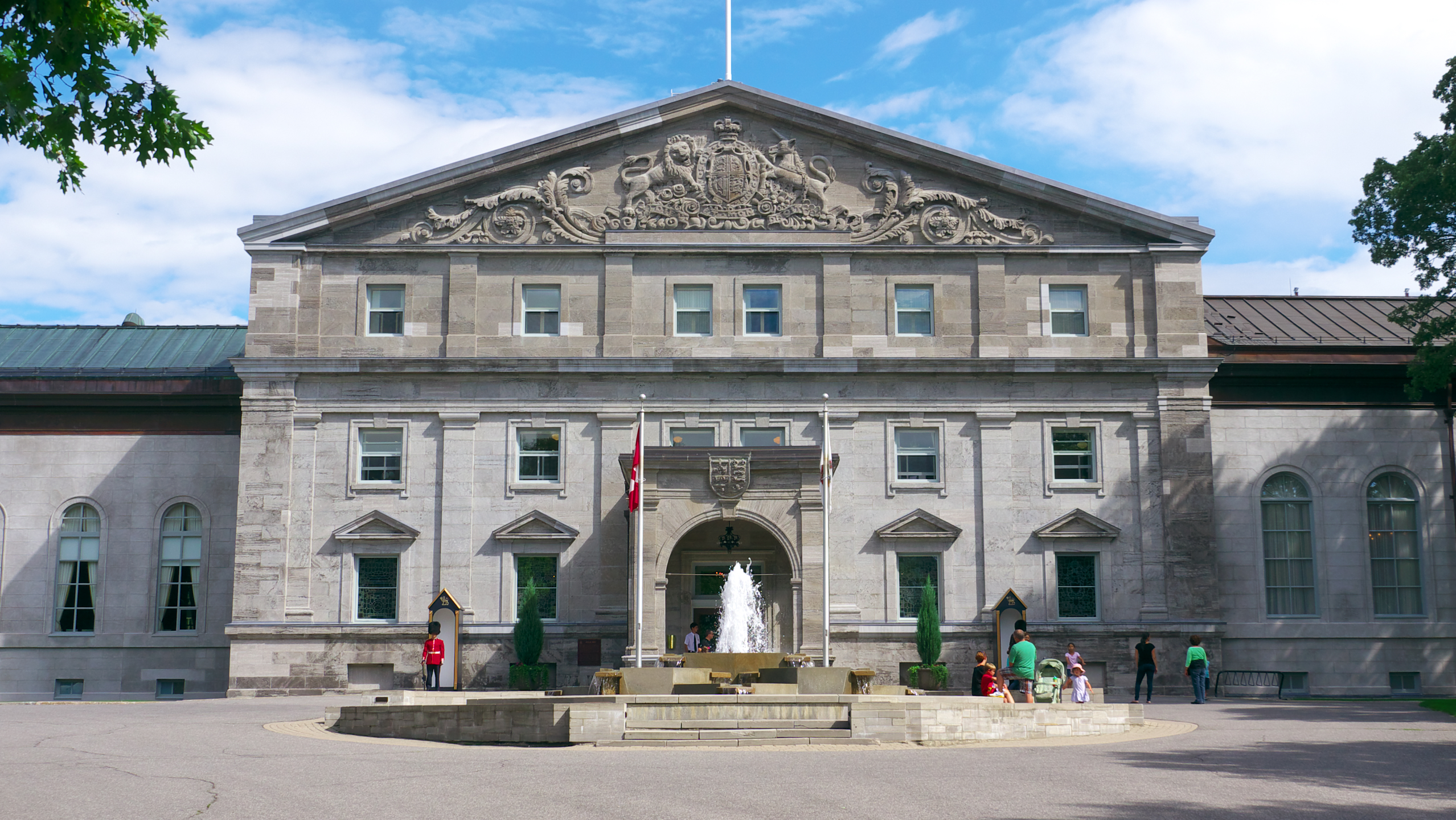
Rideau Hall, Hnatyshyn's Ottawa residence during his term as governor general

On December 14, 1989, Queen Elizabeth II, by commission under the royal sign-manual and Great Seal of Canada, appointed Prime Minister Brian Mulroney's choice of Hnatyshyn to succeed Jeanne Sauvé as the Queen's representative. He was the second consecutive Saskatchewan-born Governor-General. Hnatyshyn was sworn in during a ceremony in the Senate chamber on January 29, 1990.

Hnatyshyn thereafter made an effort to open up Rideau Hall—the monarch's and governor general's residence in Ottawa—to the public, establishing a visitors' centre and initiating guided tours of the palace and the royal park in which it sits. These moves marked a complete reversal of the policies of his predecessor Sauvé, who had closed Rideau Hall to the general public. In 1991, Hnatyshyn staged on the grounds the first of the annual Governor General's Summer Concert Series and, the year after, mounted His Excellency's Most Excellent Rock Concert and re-opened the skating rink to the public.

These events blended with some of Hnatyshyn's self-imposed mandates during his viceregal tenure, which included a desire to engage Canadian youth and focus attention on education and to encourage the arts. To these ends, he established in 1992 the Governor General's Performing Arts Award, the Ramon John Hnatyshyn Award for Voluntarism in the Arts, and the Governor General's Flight For Freedom Award for Lifetime Achievement in Literacy. Further, he founded the International Council for Canadian Studies, the Governor General Ramon John Hnatyshyn Education Fund, the Ramon John Hnatyshyn Award for Law, and the Governor General's International Award for Canadian Studies.

Among numerous other official and ceremonial duties, the Governor General presided over celebrations to mark the 125th anniversary of Confederation and welcomed to Rideau Hall the Prince and Princess of Wales, along with a host of foreign dignitaries such as President of Russia Boris Yeltsin and King Hussein and Queen Noor of Jordan. Further, Hnatyshyn undertook a number of state visits, including one to Ukraine, before his time serving at Her Majesty's pleasure ended on February 6, 1995.

Throughout his tenure as the Canadian viceroy, Hnatyshyn was both defended and criticised by the Monarchist League of Canada. In their final summary of Hnatyshyn's years in office, though, the former governor general was generally viewed to have not stood up for the Canadian Crown that he represented, choosing to follow, instead of Vincent Massey's example, that of Sauvé, who was herself seen as a republican. This lack of loyalty, it was argued, left Hnatyshyn with few defenders when he was targeted by members of the Reform Party for his salary and taxes. It was thought by John Pepall that Hnatyshyn's name had been selected by Mulroney to put forward to the Queen for appointment as governor general because Hnatyshyn, who had just recently been a member of the Cabinet headed by Mulroney until losing his parliamentary seat in the 1988 election, was someone Mulroney could "hardly feel any deference for", allowing Mulroney to continue to show the "juvenile extreme of the politician's craving for publicity and centre stage" he had while Jeanne Sauvé was governor general.

== Post viceregal career and death ==
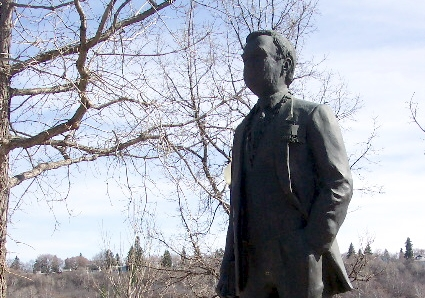
A statue of Hnatyshyn, created in 1992 by Bill Epp, stands on the banks of the South Saskatchewan River in Saskatoon, Saskatchewan

After his departure from Government House, Hnatyshyn returned to Gowling, Strathy & Henderson, where he became senior partner. In November 2002 he was installed as Chancellor of Carleton University in Ottawa; however, he died of complications from pancreatitis shortly before Christmas that year. Per tradition, and with the consent of his family, Hnatyshyn lay in state for two days in the Senate chamber. Though he was Ukrainian Orthodox, he was commemorated in his state funeral in a multi-faith ceremony on December 23, 2002, at Ottawa's Christ Church Cathedral. The service included the funeral rite of the Ukrainian Orthodox Church—officiated by Archbishop Yurij, Bishop of Toronto, and the clergy of the Ukrainian Orthodox Church—and a eulogy from the Canadian Broadcasting Corporation's chief correspondent, Peter Mansbridge. Adrienne Clarkson, by that time the sitting governor general, paid tribute to him via video, as she and her husband were en route to spend Christmas with Canadian troops stationed in the Persian Gulf. Hnatyshyn was then buried at Beechwood Cemetery in Ottawa.

Various memorials followed Hnatyshyn's death: On March 16, 2004, Canada Post unveiled at a ceremony, attended by Hnatyshyn's widow, a $0.49 postage stamp designed by Vancouver graphic artist Susan Mavor, and bearing the formal portrait of Hnatyshyn taken by Canadian Press photographer Paul Chaisson on the day Hnatyshyn became governor general, along with a tone-on-tone rendering of part of Hnatyshyn's coat of arms. Two years later, a 48-minute documentary DVD examining the life of Hnatyshyn, A Man for all Canadians was released in Canada by IKOR Film.

== Honours and arms ==
Viceregal styles of Ramon J. Hnatyshyn
- Reference style: His Excellency the Right Honourable; Son Excellence le très honorable
- Spoken style: Your Excellency; Votre Excellence

=== Honours ===
Ribbon bars of Ray Hnatyshyn

Appointments

- 1973 – December 18, 2002: Queen's Counsel for Saskatchewan (QC)
- (Canada) September 30, 1974 – October 1, 1988: Member of Parliament (MP)
- June 4, 1979 – December 18, 2002: Member of the Queen's Privy Council for Canada (PC)
- 1988 – December 18, 2002: Queen's Counsel for Canada (QC)
- 1989 – December 18, 2002: Honorary Life Member of the Law Society of Saskatchewan
- January 10, 1990 – January 29, 1990: Companion of the Order of Canada (CC)
  - January 29, 1990 – February 8, 1995: Chancellor and Principal Companion of the Order of Canada (CC)
  - February 8, 1995 – December 18, 2002: Companion of the Order of Canada (CC)
- (Canada) January 29, 1990 – February 8, 1995: Chancellor and Commander of the Order of Military Merit (CMM)
  - February 8, 1995 – December 18, 2002: Commander of the Order of Military Merit (CMM)
- January 29, 1990 – February 8, 1995: Knight of Justice, Prior, and Chief Officer in Canada of the Most Venerable Order of the Hospital of Saint John of Jerusalem
  - February 8, 1995 – December 18, 2002: Knight of Justice of the Most Venerable Order of the Hospital of Saint John of Jerusalem
- January 29, 1990 – February 8, 1995: Chief Scout of Canada
- 1990 – December 18, 2002: Honorary Member of the Royal Military College of Canada Club
- 1993 – December 18, 2002: Honorary Fellow of the Royal Heraldry Society of Canada (FRHSC)
- (Ontario) : Honorary Life Member of the Law Society of Upper Canada

Medals

- (Canada) 1977: Queen Elizabeth II Silver Jubilee Medal
- (Canada) January 29, 1990: Canadian Forces' Decoration (CD)
- 1992: Commemorative Medal for the 125th Anniversary of the Confederation of Canada
- (Canada) 2002: Queen Elizabeth II Golden Jubilee Medal

Foreign honours

- (Ukraine) 1989: Ukrainian World Congress St. Volodymyr Medal
- (Israel) 1996: Hebrew University Mount Scopus Award

==== Honorary military appointments ====
- (Canada) January 29, 1990 – February 8, 1995: Colonel of the Governor General's Horse Guards
- (Canada) January 29, 1990 – February 8, 1995: Colonel of the Governor General's Foot Guards
- (Canada) January 29, 1990 – February 8, 1995: Colonel of the Canadian Grenadier Guards

==== Honorary degrees ====
- May 23, 1990: University of Saskatchewan, Doctor of Laws (LLD)
- May 17, 1991: Royal Military College of Canada, Doctor of Laws (LLD)
- (Ontario) 1991: Queen's University, Doctor of Laws (LLD)
- (Ontario) 1991: University of Ottawa, Doctor of the University (DUniv)
- 1991: British Columbia Open University, Doctor of Laws (LLD)
- (Ontario) 1992: Carleton University, Doctor of Laws (LLD)
- (Quebec) June 15, 1992: McGill University, Doctor of Laws (LLD)
- October 23, 1992: University of Manitoba, Doctor of Laws (LLD)
- (Quebec) 1993: Bishop's University, Doctor of Civil Law (DCL)
- (Newfoundland and Labrador) October 29, 1994: Memorial University of Newfoundland, Doctor of Laws (LLD)
- 1994: University of Alberta, Doctor of Laws (LLD)
- 1994: University of Northern British Columbia, Doctor of Laws (LLD)
- (Ontario) 1996: Law Society of Upper Canada at Osgoode Hall, Doctor of Laws (LLD)
- (British Columbia) : University of Victoria, Doctor of Canon Law (JCD)
- (Canada) : Royal Roads Military College, Doctor of Laws (LLD)
- (South Korea) : Yonsei University, Doctor of Philosophy (DPhil)
- (Ukraine) : Chernivtsi University, Doctor of Laws (LLD)

==== Monuments ====
- Saskatchewan: Statue, Saskatoon
- Ontario: Park and Monument,Sudbury

==== Honorific eponyms ====
Awards

- Canada: Ramon John Hnatyshyn Cup
- Canada: Ramon John Hnatyshyn Award for Law
- Canada: Ramon John Hnatyshyn Award for Voluntarism in the Arts

Organisations

- Canada: The Hnatyshyn Foundation
- Ukraine: Ramon Hnatyshyn Canadian Studies Centre at Chernivtsi University

=== Arms ===
Coat of arms of Ray Hnatyshyn
Notes Just prior to his installation as Governor General, Hnatyshyn was granted a personal coat of arms that depicted his Ukrainian and Canadian roots. Adopted January 16, 1990 Crest A demi lion Gules charged on each shoulder with a maple leaf Argent holding in its dexter forepaw scales of justice Or; Escutcheon Per fess Bleu Céleste and Or in chief a lion passant guardant Or royally crowned proper holding in its dexter paw a maple leaf Gules fimbriated Or in base a lion passant guardant Bleu Céleste holding in its dexter paw a heart Gules; Supporters Dexter a white tailed deer per fess Bleu Céleste and Or armed and gorged with a collar all Or pendant therefrom a bezant charged with a representation of the badge of the House of Commons of Canada proper, sinister a bull per fess Bleu Céleste and Or gorged with a collar Vert fimbriated Argent pendant therefrom a prairie lily flower proper charged with the Tryzub of the Ukraine Blue Céleste Compartment the whole set upon a compartment party per pale of trees of the boreal forest Vert and a wheat field Or rising above barry wavy Azure and Argent; Motto MODERATIO IN OMNIBUS (Moderation in all things) Orders The ribbon and insignia of a Companion of the Order of Canada. DESIDERANTES MELIOREM PATRIAM (They desire a better country) Symbolism The colours and split division of the shield and supporters harkens to the flag of Ukraine, where Hnatyshyn's family originated. In the shield, the viceregal lion recalls Hnatyshyn's appointment as the Queen's representative, and the lion below is drawn from the coat of arms of Denmark, where Hnatyshyn's wife's father was from. The red lion comes from the coat of arms of Saskatchewan, where Hnatyshyn was born, the two maple leaves on the lion's shoulders (one visible) represents Hnatyshyn's two sons, and the scales it holds recall Hnatyshyn's profession as a lawyer. The deer is the same, in form, as that on the coat of arms of Saskatchewan, and the badge on its medallion is that of the House of Commons, where Hnatyshyn sat as a Member of Parliament. The bull is a symbol of Bukovina, where Hnatyshyn's parents were born, and from its collar hangs an emblem that links Saskatchewan's official flower—the prairie lily—with the trident of the Ukrainian coat of arms—a symbol of the Ukrainian people for more than 1,000 years. The compartment displays the landscape of Saskatchewan.

== Archives ==
There is a Ramon J. Hnatyshyn fonds at Library and Archives Canada.

== Electoral record ==
1984 Canadian federal election: Saskatoon West
Party	Candidate	Votes
Progressive Conservative	Ray Hnatyshyn	26,012
New Democratic	Ron Fisher	18,910
Liberal	Maureen Darling	6,355
Rhinoceros	George Adilman	495
Confederation of Regions	Dayle Goodine	337
Green	Keith A. Morvick	150
Independent	Robert J. Bonsor	109

1980 Canadian federal election: Saskatoon West
Party	Candidate	Votes
Progressive Conservative	Ray Hnatyshyn	17,636
New Democratic	Reg Parker	14,852
Liberal	C.M.Red Williams	8,116
Marxist–Leninist	Susan Dennis	97
Source: Canadian Elections Database

1979 Canadian federal election: Saskatoon West
Party	Candidate	Votes
Progressive Conservative	Ray Hnatyshyn	20,174
New Democratic	Parker, Reg	15,094
Liberal	Williams, C.M. Red	6,837
Independent	Loran, Bill	1,293
Social Credit	Cranfield, D.D.	221
Marxist–Leninist	Dennis, Susan	76

== Notes ==
Government offices
Preceded by Jeanne Sauvé	Governor General of Canada; January 29, 1990 – February 8, 1995	Succeeded by Roméo LeBlanc
Political offices
21st Canadian Ministry (1979–1980) – Cabinet of Joe Clark
Cabinet post (1)
Predecessor	Office	Successor
Alastair Gillespie	Minister of Energy, Mines and Resources; June 4, 1979 – March 3, 1980	Marc Lalonde
24th Canadian Ministry (1984–1993) – Cabinet of Brian Mulroney
Cabinet posts (2)
Predecessor	Office	Successor
John Crosbie	Minister of Justice; June 30, 1986 – December 7, 1988	Joe Clark (acting)
Erik Nielsen	President of the Privy Council; February 27, 1985 – June 30, 1986	Don Mazankowski
Parliament of Canada
Preceded by Alfred Gleave	Member of Parliament for Saskatoon—Biggar; July 8, 1974 – May 22, 1979	Succeeded by Electoral district abolished
Preceded by New electoral district	Member of Parliament for Saskatoon West; May 22, 1979 – November 21, 1988	Succeeded by Electoral district abolished
Academic offices
Preceded by Arthur Kroeger	Chancellor of Carleton University; 2002	Succeeded by Marc Garneau
