= Saskatoon West =

Federal electoral district in Saskatchewan, Canada

Saskatchewan electoral district
- Interactive map of riding boundaries from the 2025 federal election

Federal electoral district
- Legislature: House of Commons
MP
Brad Redekopp
Conservative
- District created: 2013
- First contested: 2015
- Last contested: 2025
- District webpage: profile, map

Demographics
- Population (2021): 87,855
- Electors (2021): 61,148
- Area (km²): 90.73
- Pop. density (per km²): 968.3
- Census division: Division No. 11
- Census subdivision: Saskatoon (part)

Saskatoon West (French: Saskatoon-Ouest) is a federal electoral district in Saskatchewan, Canada, that was represented in the House of Commons of Canada from 1979 to 1988, and again in 2015.

== History ==
This riding was created in 1976 from parts of Moose Jaw and Saskatoon—Biggar ridings.

It was abolished in 1987 when it was redistributed into Kindersley—Lloydminster, Saskatoon—Clark's Crossing and Saskatoon—Dundurn ridings.

The riding was recreated for the 2015 election, mostly out of the portions of Saskatoon—Rosetown—Biggar and Saskatoon—Wanuskewin located in the city of Saskatoon.

=== Historical boundaries ===
1976 representation order

2013 representation order

2023 representation order

== Boundaries description ==
Consisting of those parts of the province of Saskatchewan and the City of Saskatoon described as follows: commencing at the intersection of Highway No. 11 with Range Road 3052; thence southerly along Range Road 3052 and Wanuskewin Road to the easterly limit of the City of Saskatoon; thence generally southerly along said limit to Wanuskewin Road at approximate latitude 52°11'43"N and longitude 106°37'23"W; thence generally southerly along said road and Warman Road to 33rd Street East; thence easterly along said street and its production to the South Saskatchewan River; thence generally southwesterly along said river to the southerly limit of the City of Saskatoon; thence southwesterly, generally northwesterly and generally northeasterly along the southerly, westerly and northerly limits of said city to Beam Road; thence easterly and northeasterly along said road to Marquis Drive; thence easterly along said drive to Thatcher Avenue; thence northerly along said avenue to 71st Street West; thence easterly along said street to Highway No. 11 (the northwesterly limit of the City of Saskatoon); thence northerly and northeasterly along said highway and said limit to the point of commencement.

== Demographics ==
According to the 2021 census

Ethnic groups (2021): 55% White, 18.2% Aboriginal, 10.2% Filipino, 6.8% South Asian, 3.1% Black, 2.3% Southeast Asian, 1.3 Latin American, 1.1% Chinese
Languages (2021): 73.6% English, 5.6% Tagalog, 1.6% Punjabi, 1.2% Urdu, 1.1% Spanish, 1% Bengali
Religions (2021): 51.3% Christian (25.1% Catholic, 4.3% United Church, 2.2% Anglican, 1.9% Lutheran, 1.4% Christian Orthodox, 1.4% Pentecostal and other Charismatic, 1.2% Anabaptist, 1.1% Baptist), 38% No religion, 4.7% Muslim, 1.9% Sikh, 1.1% Traditional Spirituality, 1% Hindu
Median income (2021): $39,200
Median after-tax income (2021): $35,600

Average income (2021): $46,000
Average after-tax income (2021): $39,840

Panethnic groups in Saskatoon West (2011−2021)
Panethnic group	2021		2016		2011	
Panethnic group	Pop.	%	Pop.	%	Pop.	%
European (Note: Statistic includes all persons that did not make up part of a visible minority or an indigenous identity.)	47,345	54.96%	48,390	59.12%	50,335	66.89%
Indigenous	15,690	18.21%	15,140	18.5%	13,655	18.15%
Southeast Asian (Note: Statistic includes total responses of "Filipino" and "Southeast Asian" under visible minority section on census.)	10,780	12.51%	8,185	10%	5,280	7.02%
South Asian	5,875	6.82%	4,420	5.4%	1,490	1.98%
African	2,645	3.07%	1,905	2.33%	930	1.24%
Latin American	1,115	1.29%	945	1.15%	730	0.97%
East Asian (Note: Statistic includes total responses of "Chinese", "Korean", and "Japanese" under visible minority section on census.)	1,090	1.27%	1,180	1.44%	1,550	2.06%
Middle Eastern (Note: Statistic includes total responses of "West Asian" and "Arab" under visible minority section on census.)	910	1.06%	840	1.03%	600	0.8%
Other/multiracial (Note: Statistic includes total responses of "Visible minority, n.i.e." and "Multiple visible minorities" under visible minority section on census.)	705	0.82%	855	1.04%	680	0.9%
Total responses	86,145	98.05%	81,850	97.78%	75,245	98.1%
Total population	87,855	100%	83,711	100%	76,704	100%
Notes: Totals greater than 100% due to multiple origin responses. Demographics based on 2012 Canadian federal electoral redistribution riding boundaries.

== Members of Parliament ==
This riding has elected the following members of the House of Commons of Canada:

Parliament	Years	Member	Party
Saskatoon West; Riding created from Moose Jaw and Saskatoon—Biggar
31st	1979–1980	Ray Hnatyshyn	Progressive Conservative
32nd	1980–1984	Ray Hnatyshyn	Progressive Conservative
33rd	1984–1988	Ray Hnatyshyn	Progressive Conservative
Riding dissolved into Kindersley—Lloydminster, Saskatoon—Clark's Crossing, and Saskatoon—Dundurn
Riding re-created from Saskatoon—Rosetown—Biggar and Saskatoon—Wanuskewin
42nd	2015–2019	Sheri Benson	New Democratic
43rd	2019–2021	Brad Redekopp	Conservative
44th	2021–2025	Brad Redekopp	Conservative
45th	2025–present	Brad Redekopp	Conservative

== Election results ==
=== 2015–present ===
Graph of election results in Saskatoon West (minor parties that never got 2% of the vote or didn't run consistently are omitted)

2025 Canadian federal election
** Preliminary results — Not yet official **
Party	Candidate	Votes	%	±%	Expenditures
Conservative	Brad Redekopp	19,707	52.48	+7.11	
Liberal	Chad Eggerman	10,257	27.31	+19.12	
New Democratic	Rachel Loewen Walker	7,187	19.14	–20.16	
Green	Naomi Hunter	403	1.07	+0.02	
Total valid votes/expense limit					
Total rejected ballots					
Turnout		37,554	58.79		
Eligible voters		63,880			
Conservative notional hold		Swing		–6.01	
Source: Elections Canada

2021 federal election redistributed results
Party	Vote	%
Conservative	15,386	45.37
New Democratic	13,329	39.30
Liberal	2,779	8.19
People's	2,065	6.09
Green	357	1.05

2021 Canadian federal election
Party	Candidate	Votes	%	±%	Expenditures
Conservative	Brad Redekopp	15,379	45.4	-2.3	$101,524.46
New Democratic	Robert Doucette	13,328	39.3	-1.0	$98,502.73
Liberal	Ruben Rajakumar	2,778	8.2	+0.86	$22,012.29
People's	Kevin Boychuk	2,064	6.1	+4.11	$9,067.48
Green	Dave Greenfield	357	1.1	-1.57	$166.25
Total valid votes/expense limit		33,906	99.16	+0.17	$119,102.72
Total rejected ballots		284	0.84	-0.17	
Turnout		34,190	55.91	-8.05	
Eligible voters		61,148			
Source: Elections Canada
Conservative hold		Swing		-0.96	

2019 Canadian federal election
Party	Candidate	Votes	%	±%	Expenditures
Conservative	Brad Redekopp	18,597	47.70	+14.82	$82,759.63
New Democratic	Sheri Benson	15,708	40.29	+0.73	$101,089.71
Liberal	Shah Rukh	2,863	7.34	-17.14	$13,960.24
Green	Shawn Setyo	1,042	2.67	+0.93	$658.36
People's	Isaac Hayes	775	1.99	-	$2,776.00
Total valid votes/expense limit		38,985	98.99		
Total rejected ballots		397	1.01	+0.56	
Turnout		39,382	63.96	-2.48	
Eligible voters		61,577			
Conservative gain from New Democratic		Swing		+7.05	
Source: Elections Canada

2015 Canadian federal election
Party	Candidate	Votes	%	±%	Expenditures
New Democratic	Sheri Benson	14,921	39.56	-11.57	$138,813.32
Conservative	Randy Donauer	12,401	32.88	-9.66	$120,540.81
Liberal	Lisa Abbott	9,234	24.48	+20.71	$27,228.57
Green	Lois Carol Mitchell	658	1.74	-0.83	$248.05
Canada Party	Jim Pankiw	271	0.72	–	$22,678.24
Libertarian	Bronek Hart	230	0.61	–	$603.00
Total valid votes/expense limit		37,715	99.55		$192,280.99
Total rejected ballots		170	0.45	–	
Turnout		37,885	66.44	–	
Eligible voters		57,021			
New Democratic notional hold		Swing		-0.33	
Source: Elections Canada

2011 federal election redistributed results
Party	Vote	%
New Democratic	15,573	51.13
Conservative	12,955	42.54
Liberal	1,147	3.77
Green	782	2.57

=== 1979–1988 ===
1984 Canadian federal election
Party	Candidate	Votes
Progressive Conservative	Ray Hnatyshyn	26,012
New Democratic	Ron Fisher	18,910
Liberal	Maureen Darling	6,355
Rhinoceros	George Adilman	495
Confederation of Regions	Dayle Goodine	337
Green	Keith A. Morvick	150
Independent	Robert J. Bonsor	109

1980 Canadian federal election
Party	Candidate	Votes
Progressive Conservative	Ray Hnatyshyn	17,636
New Democratic	Reg Parker	14,852
Liberal	C.M.Red Williams	8,116
Marxist–Leninist	Susan Dennis	97
Source: Canadian Elections Database

1979 Canadian federal election
Party	Candidate	Votes
Progressive Conservative	Ray Hnatyshyn	20,174
New Democratic	Parker, Reg	15,094
Liberal	Williams, C.M. Red	6,837
Independent	Loran, Bill	1,293
Social Credit	Cranfield, D.D.	221
Marxist–Leninist	Dennis, Susan	76

== Riding map ==
A detailed map can be found on the Elections Canada website.

== See also ==
- List of Canadian electoral districts
- Historical federal electoral districts of Canada
