= Redekopp =

Redekopp is a surname. Notable people with the surname include:

- Brad Redekopp (born c. 1964), Canadian politician in Saskatchewan
- Howard Redekopp, Canadian musician
