= Coteau Beach =

Resort village in Saskatchewan, Canada

- Resort village
- Resort Village of Coteau Beach
- Location within Saskatchewan
- Coordinates: 51.164°N 106.824°W
- Country: Canada
- Province: Saskatchewan
- Census division: 7
- Rural municipality: Coteau
- Incorporated: August 1, 1982

Government
  - Mayor: Jeff Sopczak
  - Governing body: Resort Village Council
  - Administrator: Steven Piermantier

Area (2021)
  - Land: 0.7 km^{2} (0.27 sq mi)

Population (2021)
  - Total: 170
  - Density: 242.9/km^{2} (629/sq mi)
- Time zone: CST
  - Summer (DST): CST
- Postal code: S0L 0G0
- Area codes: 306 and 639
- Highway(s): Highway 45
- Waterway(s): Lake Diefenbaker
- Website: Official website

Coteau Beach (2021 population: 170) is a resort village in the Canadian province of Saskatchewan within Census Division No. 7. It is on the western shore of the Thomson Arm of Lake Diefenbaker in the Rural Municipality of Coteau No. 255. It is 10 kilometres (6.2 mi) east of Highway 45 and approximately 40 kilometres (25 mi) southeast of the town of Outlook.

== History ==
Coteau Beach incorporated as a resort village on August 1, 1982.

== Demographics ==
Population history (1986–2021)
Year	Pop.	±%
1986	19	—
1991	19	+0.0%
1996	19	+0.0%
2001	20	+5.3%
2006	30	+50.0%
2011	40	+33.3%
2016	48	+20.0%
2021	170	+254.2%
Source: Statistics Canada via Saskatchewan Bureau of Statistics

In the 2021 Census of Population conducted by Statistics Canada, Coteau Beach had a population of 170 living in 59 of its 127 total private dwellings, a change of 254.2% from its 2016 population of 48. With a land area of 0.7 km^{2} (0.27 sq mi), it had a population density of 242.9/km^{2} (629.0/sq mi) in 2021.

In the 2016 Census of Population conducted by Statistics Canada, the Resort Village of Coteau Beach recorded a population of 48 living in 24 of its 128 total private dwellings, a 20% change from its 2011 population of 40. With a land area of 0.54 km^{2} (0.21 sq mi), it had a population density of 88.9/km^{2} (230.2/sq mi) in 2016.

== Government ==
The Resort Village of Coteau Beach is governed by an elected municipal council and an appointed administrator. The mayor is Jeff Sopczak and its administrator is Steven Piermantier.

== See also ==
- List of communities in Saskatchewan
- List of municipalities in Saskatchewan
- List of resort villages in Saskatchewan
- List of villages in Saskatchewan
- List of summer villages in Alberta
