= Ardath, Saskatchewan =

Community in Saskatchewan, Canada

Ardath
- Unincorporated community
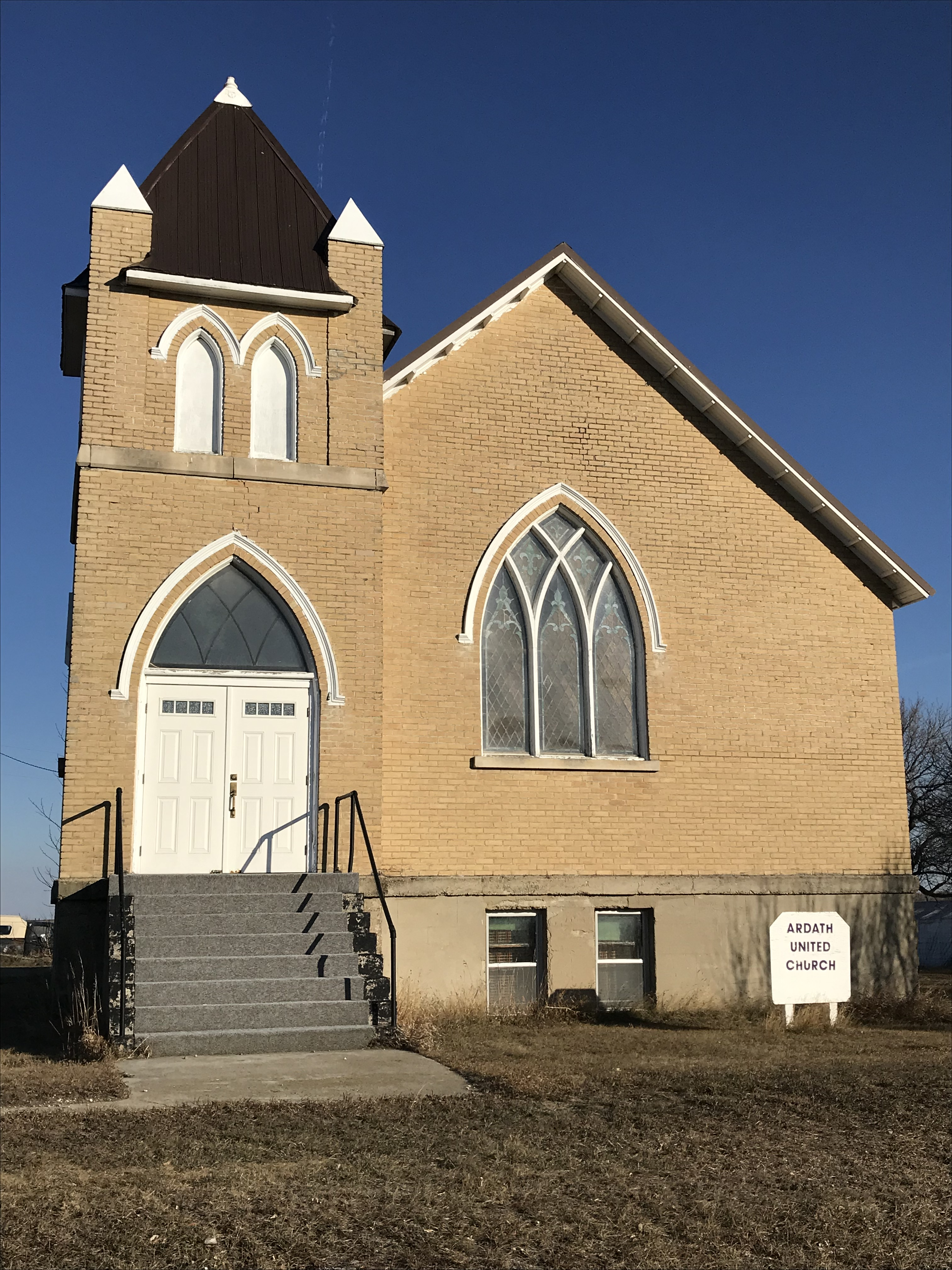
- Ardath United Church

- Location within Saskatchewan Location within Canada
- Coordinates: 51.618°N 107.228°W
- Country: Canada
- Province: Saskatchewan
- Region: West-central
- Census division: 12
- Rural municipality: Fertile Valley No. 285
- Restructured (Unincorporated community): December 31, 1972

Government
  - Governing body: Fertile Valley No. 285
- Elevation: 57.91 m (190.0 ft)
- Time zone: Central Standard Time (CST)
- Postal code: S0L 0B0
- Area code: 306
- Highways: Highway 654

Ardath is an unincorporated community in the west-central region of Saskatchewan located on Highway 654, along the Canadian National Railway, Delisle–Tichfield Junction stub. The community is located approximately 10 kilometres (6.2 mi) north of Conquest and is about 20 kilometres (12 mi) north west of Outlook. Its most notable buildings are a curling rink and a brick United Church.

== History ==
Prior to December 31, 1972, Ardath was a village, but it was restructured as an unincorporated community on that date. Ardath took its name from the British novel Ardath: The Story of a Dead Self by Marie Corelli . Both the Ardath United Church and the town hall were built in 1912. Ardath's decline began after a series of bizarre events, starting in 1919 when a train crashed through one of the village's grain elevators killing three people.

"But at 10:15 a.m. on March 24, 1919 things began to go horribly wrong at Ardath. A southbound passenger train took to the switch track at high speed and slammed through the first of four grain elevators at Ardath. The elevator agent had just left the office, and was at the station to put his mail on the train. All that remained of his office was his chair. When the train came to a crashing halt it was buried in grain. Three people were killed in the accident; the locomotive fireman, the engineer, and a passenger."

A few years later, a fire destroyed most of main street resulting in a large scale exodus from the community of many of the community's 150 residents.

== HMCS Margaret Brooke ==
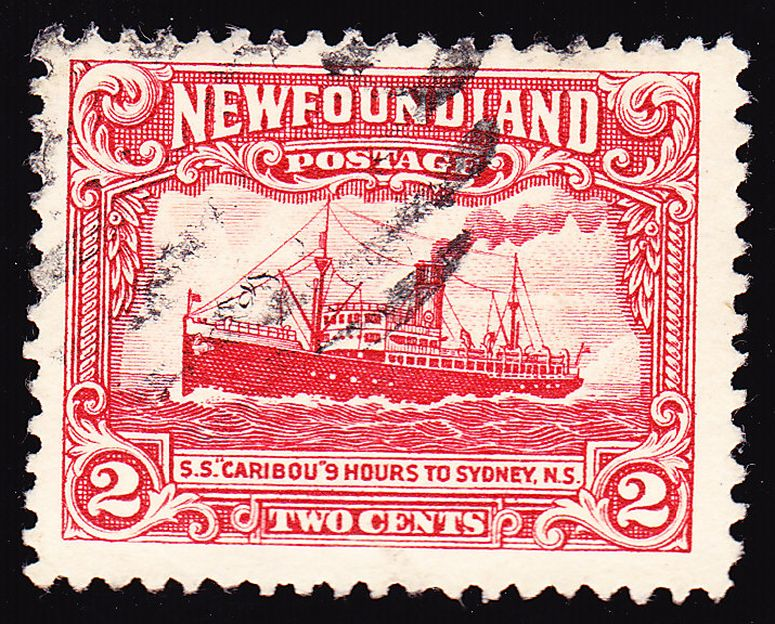
A stamp commemorating the SS Caribou incident

A Canadian naval ship, HMCS Margaret Brooke, a Harry DeWolf-class offshore patrol vessel is the first Canadian naval vessel ever named after a woman — Margaret Brooke, a nursing sister who grew up on a farm near Ardath. Margaret was singled out for the honour due to the bravery that she exhibited on the night of October 13, 1942 in a wartime naval incident involving the sinking of the ferry SS Caribou by a German U-boat during the Battle of the St. Lawrence during the Second World War.

== Economy ==
Agriculture is the top employment field with many surrounding farms and ranches.

== Education ==
Ardath no longer has a school, but students who live in Ardath are sent to the neighbouring town of Outlook.

== See also ==
- List of communities in Saskatchewan
