= Donavon, Saskatchewan =

Community in Saskatchewan, Canada

Coordinates: 51°47′46″N 107°07′37″W

Donavon is a hamlet in the Rural Municipality of Montrose No. 315, Saskatchewan, Canada. The hamlet is located southwest of Saskatoon along Highway 45 and Canadian National Railway, Delisle–Tichfield Junction stub.

The name is a combination of the Don River (Ontario) and the Avon River (Ontario).

== Gallery ==
Points of interest in Donavon, Saskatchewan and area.

Knox United Church memorial near Donavon, Saskatchewan

Former school in Donavon, Saskatchewan

Donavon, Saskatchewan school sign

== See also ==
- List of communities in Saskatchewan
- List of hamlets in Saskatchewan
