= Dunblane, Saskatchewan =

Ghost town in Saskatchewan, Canada

Dunblane
- Location of Dunblane in Saskatchewan Dunblane (Canada)
- Coordinates: 51.2021°N 106.8798°W
- Country: Canada
- Province: Saskatchewan
- Rural municipality: Coteau No. 255
- Post office Founded: 1914-05-01 (Closed 1979-06-06)
- Incorporated (Village): N/A
- Dissolved: May 1, 1975
- Time zone: CST
- Postal code: S0L 0X0
- Area code: 306
- Highways: Highway

Dunblane is a ghost town in the Canadian province of Saskatchewan. Access is from Highway 45.

== History ==
The town was on the Canadian National Railway Conquest Subdivision. Rail service first arrived in 1914, and the town prospered to a population of over 300, also as a result of the construction of Gardiner Dam at Lake Diefenbaker. This number remained until the construction of an oil pipelines made rail transport less viable for the transportation of Turner Valley crude oil. The ultimate end of this village was when the Dunblane Bridge ended up getting removed, and after the completion of Gardiner Dam, the population significantly eroded to the point where there were less than fifty people, including only seven children, occupying only around 20 houses, and by 1980, there was little left of the original town site.

== Notable people ==
- Steve Buzinski — NHL Hockey Player

== See also ==
- List of communities in Saskatchewan
- List of ghost towns in Saskatchewan
