= Rural Municipality of Montrose No. 315 =

Rural municipality in Saskatchewan, Canada

Montrose No. 315
- Rural municipality
- Rural Municipality of Montrose No. 315
- Location of the RM of Montrose No. 315 in Saskatchewan
- Coordinates: 51.765°N 107.045°W
- Country: Canada
- Province: Saskatchewan
- Census division: 12
- SARM division: 5
- Formed: December 13, 1909

Government
  - Reeve: Murray Purcell
  - Governing body: RM of Montrose No. 315 Council
  - Administrator: Desiree Bouvier
  - Office location: Delisle

Area (2016)
  - Land: 898.38 km^{2} (346.87 sq mi)

Population (2016)
  - Total: 712
  - Density: 0.8/km^{2} (2.1/sq mi)
- Time zone: CST
  - Summer (DST): CST
- Area codes: 306 and 639

The Rural Municipality of Montrose No. 315 (2016 population: 712) is a rural municipality (RM) in the Canadian province of Saskatchewan within Census Division No. 12 and SARM Division No. 5.

== History ==
The RM of Montrose No. 315 incorporated as a rural municipality on December 13, 1909.

== Geography ==
=== Communities and localities ===
The following unincorporated communities are within the RM.

Localities

- Donavon
- Gledhow
- Laura (dissolved as a village, December 31, 1954, again December 28, 1978)
- Swanson
- Valley Park

== Demographics ==
Population history (1981–2016)
Year	Pop.	±%
1981	668	—
1986	699	+4.6%
1991	714	+2.1%
1996	693	−2.9%
2001	710	+2.5%
2006	648	−8.7%
2011	712	+9.9%
2016	712	+0.0%
Source: Statistics Canada via Saskatchewan Bureau of Statistics

In the 2021 Census of Population conducted by Statistics Canada, the RM of Montrose No. 315 had a population of 647 living in 249 of its 283 total private dwellings, a change of −9.1% from its 2016 population of 712. With a land area of 897.57 km^{2} (346.55 sq mi), it had a population density of 0.7/km^{2} (1.9/sq mi) in 2021.

In the 2016 Census of Population, the RM of Montrose No. 315 recorded a population of 712 living in 269 of its 299 total private dwellings, a 0% change from its 2011 population of 712. With a land area of 898.38 km^{2} (346.87 sq mi), it had a population density of 0.8/km^{2} (2.1/sq mi) in 2016.

== Government ==
The RM of Montrose No. 315 is governed by an elected municipal council and an appointed administrator that meets on the second Thursday of every month. The reeve of the RM is Murray Purcell while its administrator is Desiree Bouvier. The RM's office is located in Delisle.

== Transportation ==
- Saskatchewan Highway 7
- Saskatchewan Highway 45
- Saskatchewan Highway 766
- Canadian National Railway Company
- Big Sky Railway Corporation

== See also ==
- List of rural municipalities in Saskatchewan
