= Steve Buzinski =

Canadian ice hockey player

- Born: October 15, 1917 Dunblane, Saskatchewan, Canada
- Died: February 20, 1992 (aged 74) Swift Current, Saskatchewan, Canada
- Height: 5 ft 8 in (173 cm)
- Weight: 140 lb (64 kg; 10 st 0 lb)
- Position: Goaltender
- Caught: Left
- Played for: New York Rangers
- Playing career: 1934–1951

Steven Rudolph Buzinski (October 15, 1917 – February 20, 1992) was a Canadian professional ice hockey goaltender who played 9 games for the New York Rangers in the National Hockey League in 1942.

== Playing career ==
Born in Dunblane, Saskatchewan, Buzinski was brought to Swift Current, Saskatchewan in 1938 to play goal for the senior league Swift Current Indians where they competed for Allan Cup berths in the 1940s, winning the western Canadian senior championship in 1940 and 1941, and making it to the regional finals in 1942.

Ravaged by wartime enlistments - the Rangers, during the 1943 season, fielded two 17-year-olds at various points, along with several other teenagers and minor leaguers. New York lost its starting goaltender from the previous season because of the enlistment of regular goaltender Sugar Jim Henry. To replace him, Rangers' manager Lester Patrick hoped to obtain the services of minor-leaguer Omer Kelly, but he was fixed in a wartime manufacturing job in Baltimore. Buzinski was invited to try out for the team in training camp, and did well enough to be named the starter going into the regular season.

Behind a notably weak Rangers lineup which had only Ott Heller from its previous lineup on defense, and which spent most of the season in last place, Buzinski fared poorly, allowing 55 goals in his nine games as the team's starting goaltender. He provoked several colorful anecdotes, among which was in making his first save in a game, to the glove side, and telling Heller "Nothing like it, Ott, just like picking apples off a tree" before going on to surrender ten goals in that match.

While his worst record came in the season's first four games - in which he allowed 33 goals, including a 10–4 loss to the Montreal Canadiens on November 8, otherwise notable for surrendering Maurice Richard's first NHL goal, and a 12–5 loss to Detroit in which Red Wings star Carl Liscombe set the then-NHL record for points in a game with 7 - after an 8–6 loss to the Toronto Maple Leafs on November 28, Rangers' management had had enough. Replaced with Jimmy Franks, Buzinski was demoted to the Rangers' AHL New Haven Eagles farm team on December 3 to practice with the club, with coach Frank Boucher saying, "If they think enough of him, he will get a chance to show what he can do in a regular game." Buzinski subsequently enlisted, never playing another professional game, and after the war returned to the Swift Current Indians senior team, where he played until retiring from organized hockey in 1953.

== Retirement ==
Buzinzki finished his NHL career with a record of 2-6-1 and a 6.10 goals against average. His second and final win, a 5–3 victory over the Chicago Black Hawks on November 10, was noteworthy in that it was the last regular-season overtime game played for over 40 years. League president Frank Calder eliminated them 11 days later as part of wartime cutbacks. They were restored in 1983.

In civilian life, Buzinski worked for 41 years as a plant breeder for Agriculture Canada during and after his hockey career, as well as coaching hockey at the intermediate level. The nickname "The Puck Goes Inski" is associated with Buzinski, but there are no contemporaneous uses of the moniker, which appears to have been invented by hockey writer Stan Fischler sometime in the 1970s. Buzinski's own comment on the origin of the nickname was "I have no idea at all. A lot of this is a figment of somebody's imagination."

== Career statistics ==
=== Regular season and playoffs ===
			Regular season								Playoffs
Season	Team	League	GP	W	L	T	Min	GA	SO	GAA	GP	W	L	T	Min	GA	SO	GAA
1934–35	Saskatoon Nutana	SCJHL	6	5	0	1	420	8	1	1.37	2	0	2	0	120	8	0	4.00
1935–36	Prince Albert St. Marks	SAHA	—	—	—	—	—	—	—	—	2	0	2	0	120	17	0	8.50
1936–37	Prince Albert Mintos	SSHL	2	—	—	—	120	13	0	6.50	—	—	—	—	—	—	—	—
1937–38	Swift Current Indians	SIHA	—	—	—	—	—	—	—	—	—	—	—	—	—	—	—	—
1938–39	Swift Current Indians	SIHA	—	—	—	—	—	—	—	—	—	—	—	—	—	—	—	—
1939–40	Swift Current Indians	SIHA	—	—	—	—	—	—	—	—	—	—	—	—	—	—	—	—
1940–41	Swift Current Indians	SIHA	—	—	—	—	—	—	—	—	—	—	—	—	—	—	—	—
1941–42	Swift Current Indians	SIHA	—	—	—	—	—	—	—	—	8	6	1	1	480	16	0	2.00
1942–43	New York Rangers	NHL	9	2	6	1	560	55	0	5.89	—	—	—	—	—	—	—	—
1942–43	Swift Current Indians	SIHA	—	—	—	—	—	—	—	—	—	—	—	—	—	—	—	—
1945–46	Swift Current Indians	SIHA	—	—	—	—	—	—	—	—	—	—	—	—	—	—	—	—
1946–47	Swift Current Indians	SIHA	—	—	—	—	—	—	—	—	—	—	—	—	—	—	—	—
1947–48	Swift Current Indians	SIHA	—	—	—	—	—	—	—	—	—	—	—	—	—	—	—	—
1948–49	Swift Current Indians	SIHA	—	—	—	—	—	—	—	—	—	—	—	—	—	—	—	—
1949–50	Swift Current Indians	SIHA	—	—	—	—	—	—	—	—	—	—	—	—	—	—	—	—
1950–51	Swift Current Indians	SIHA	24	10	11	3	1470	80	0	3.37	5	1	3	1	310	21	0	4.06
NHL totals			9	2	6	1	560	55	0	5.89	—	—	—	—	—	—	—	—
