= Laura, Saskatchewan =

Community in Saskatchewan, Canada

Laura
- Hamlet
- Location within Saskatchewan Location within Canada
- Coordinates: 51.5100°N 107.1602°W
- Country: Canada
- Province: Saskatchewan
- Region: West-central
- Census division: 8
- Rural municipality: Montrose No. 315
- Established: N/A
- Incorporated (Village): N/A
- Restructured (Hamlet): December 31, 1954, again on December 28, 1978

Government
  - Governing body: Montrose No. 315

Area
  - Total: 0.00 km^{2} (0 sq mi)

Population (2006)
  - Total: n/a
  - Density: 0/km^{2} (0/sq mi)
- Time zone: CST
- Area code: 306
- Highways: Highway 7
- Railways: Canadian National Railway

Laura is a hamlet in the Rural Municipality of Montrose No. 315, Saskatchewan, Canada. It previously held the status of village until December 31, 1954, and again at an unknown date but was restructured back to hamlet status on December 28, 1978. The hamlet is located southwest of Saskatoon along Highway 7 and Canadian National Railway Saskatoon-Rosetown stub. Prior to the Great Depression, Laura was a bustling active pioneer farming community.

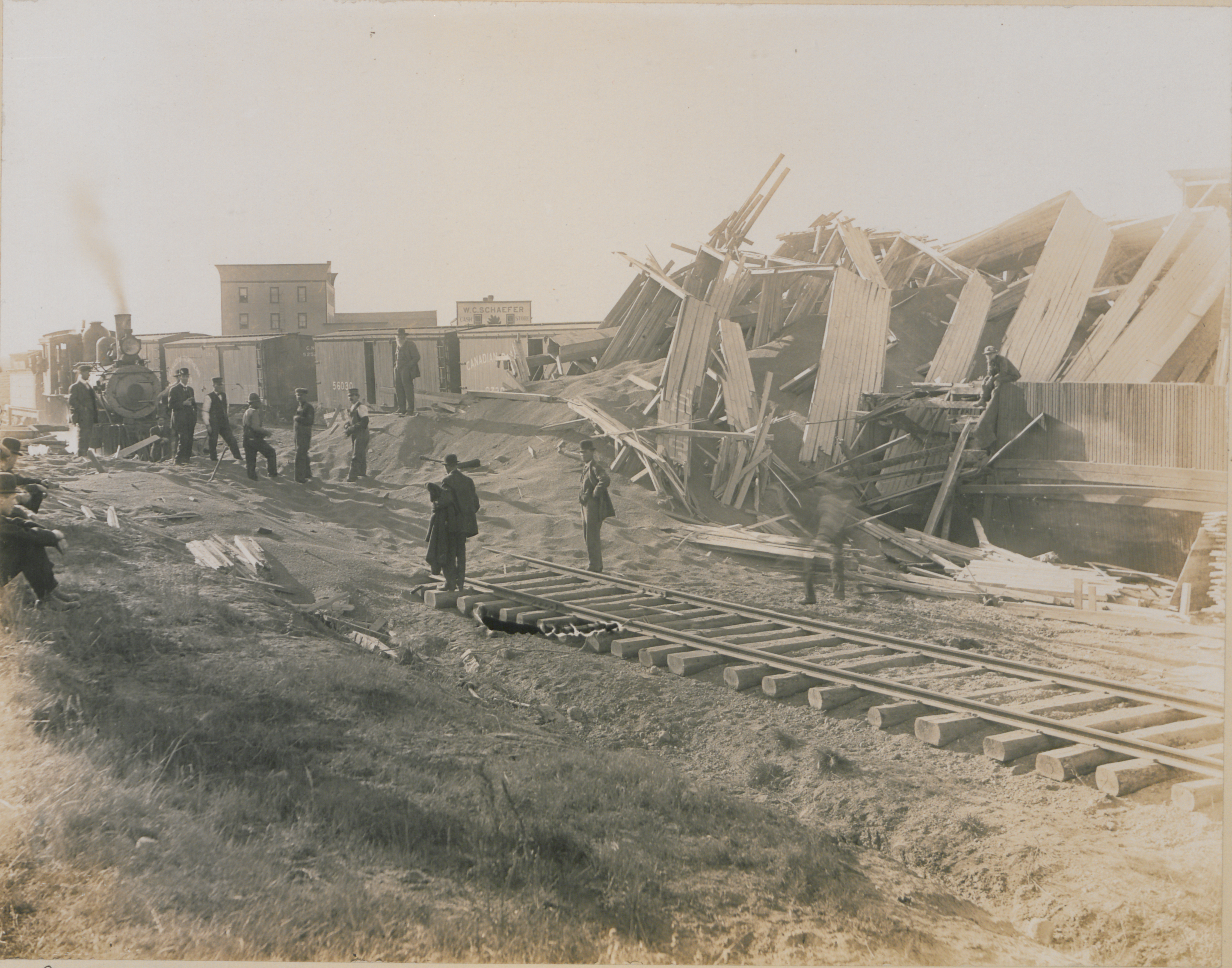
Train wreck destroying a grain elevator, Laura (1911).

== History ==
Prior to December 31, 1954, Laura was incorporated as a village, and was restructured as a hamlet under the jurisdiction of the Rural Municipality of Montrose on that date. The hamlet was incorporated under village status at an unknown date. That status was again taken over by the jurisdiction of the RM of Montrose on December 28, 1978.

== See also ==
- List of communities in Saskatchewan
- List of hamlets in Saskatchewan
