= Gledhow, Saskatchewan =

Locality in Saskatchewan, Canada

Coordinates: 51.78338°N 106.83456°W

Gledhow is a hamlet in the Rural Municipality of Montrose No. 315, Saskatchewan, Canada. The hamlet is located southwest of Saskatoon approximately 20 kilometres (12 mi) east of Highway 45 along O'Malley Road.

== See also ==
- List of communities in Saskatchewan
- List of hamlets in Saskatchewan
