= Sheri Benson =

Canadian politician

Deputy Leader of the New Democratic Party
- In office March 14, 2019 – October 20, 2019 Serving with Alexandre Boulerice
- Leader: Jagmeet Singh
- Preceded by: David Christopherson
- Succeeded by: Alexandre Boulerice

Member of Parliament for Saskatoon West
- In office October 19, 2015 – September 11, 2019
- Preceded by: Riding Established
- Succeeded by: Brad Redekopp

Personal details
- Born: 1962 or 1963 (age 62–63) Brandon, Manitoba, Canada
- Party: New Democratic
- Portfolio: NDP Critic for Housing

Sheri Benson (born 1962 or 1963) is a Canadian politician who represented the riding of Saskatoon West in the House of Commons of Canada from the 2015 election until her defeat in 2019. She is a member of the New Democratic Party (NDP). Prior to her election, she was the CEO of the local United Way and also served as a justice of the peace.

== Early life ==
Benson lived in Brandon and Winnipeg during her early childhood, where she also participated in Girl Guides of Canada programs as a Brownie and Guide. As a member of Girl Guides, Benson earned a fire safety badge for which she was presented a certificate of achievement by Howard Pawley, and often went by the nickname "Safety Sher".

== Background and prior community involvement ==
As CEO for the local United Way, since 2009, Benson worked with community, labour, and business groups to launch Saskatoon's first-ever Plan to End Homelessness and Saskatoon's Housing First Program. Benson also implemented the organization's ground-breaking Aboriginal Engagement Strategy.

Under Benson's leadership, United Way support for community programs grew 60%—to nearly $5-million in 2014.

Benson was the inaugural Justice of the Peace for Saskatchewan's Victims of Domestic Violence Act. In 2014, Benson received a YWCA Woman of Distinction Award for Community Building.

To further strengthen community services, she co-founded the Saskatoon Collaborative Funding Partnership and has co-chaired the Saskatoon Regional Intersectoral Committee.

== Politics ==
Benson was elected in the 2015 federal election representing Saskatoon West.

Benson was appointed as Deputy Leader of the NDP serving with Alexandre Boulerice on March 14, 2019, by party leader Jagmeet Singh. She also served as the NDP critic for Housing in the 42nd Canadian Parliament.

She was one of five out LGBT people serving in the 42nd Canadian Parliament, alongside Rob Oliphant, Seamus O'Regan, Randall Garrison and Randy Boissonnault. Benson was the first out LGBT politician in Saskatchewan to be elected to the House of Commons.

She was defeated by Conservative Brad Redekopp in the 2019 federal election.

== Electoral record ==
2019 Canadian federal election: Saskatoon West
Party	Candidate	Votes	%	±%	Expenditures
Conservative	Brad Redekopp	18,597	47.70	+14.82	$82,759.63
New Democratic	Sheri Benson	15,708	40.29	+0.73	$101,089.71
Liberal	Shah Rukh	2,863	7.34	-17.14	$13,960.24
Green	Shawn Setyo	1,042	2.67	+0.93	$658.36
People's	Isaac Hayes	775	1.99	-	$2,776.00
Total valid votes/expense limit		38,985	98.99		
Total rejected ballots		397	1.01	+0.56	
Turnout		39,382	63.96	-2.48	
Eligible voters		61,577			
Conservative gain from New Democratic		Swing		+7.05	
Source: Elections Canada

2015 Canadian federal election: Saskatoon West
Party	Candidate	Votes	%	±%	Expenditures
New Democratic	Sheri Benson	14,921	39.56	-11.57	$138,813.32
Conservative	Randy Donauer	12,401	32.88	-9.66	$120,540.81
Liberal	Lisa Abbott	9,234	24.48	+20.71	$27,228.57
Green	Lois Carol Mitchell	658	1.74	-0.83	$248.05
Canada Party	Jim Pankiw	271	0.72	–	$22,678.24
Libertarian	Bronek Hart	230	0.61	–	$603.00
Total valid votes/expense limit		37,715	99.55		$192,280.99
Total rejected ballots		170	0.45	–	
Turnout		37,885	66.44	–	
Eligible voters		57,021			
New Democratic notional hold		Swing		-0.33	
Source: Elections Canada
