= Brad Redekopp =

Canadian politician

Brad Redekopp MP

Member of Parliament for Saskatoon West
- Incumbent
- Assumed office October 21, 2019
- Preceded by: Sheri Benson

Personal details
- Born: 1964 or 1965 (age 60–61) Yorkton, Saskatchewan, Canada
- Party: Conservative Party of Canada

Brad Redekopp MP (born 1964/1965) is a Canadian politician who was elected to represent the riding of Saskatoon West in the House of Commons of Canada in the 2019 Canadian federal election.

== Biography ==
Redekopp was born in Yorkton, Saskatchewan. He has lived in the Saskatoon, Saskatchewan, area since 1984 and received a bachelor's degree in commerce from the University of Saskatchewan. Redekopp worked in finance and accounting roles for twenty years in the manufacturing industry and worked as a plant manager for Case New Holland in Saskatoon. Prior to his election, he owned and operated a home building company, Cherry Creek Homes, for ten years. Redekopp is married to his wife, Cheryl, and has two sons, Kyle and Eric.

== Electoral record ==
2025 Canadian federal election: Saskatoon West
** Preliminary results — Not yet official **
Party	Candidate	Votes	%	±%	Expenditures
Conservative	Brad Redekopp	19,707	52.48	+7.11	
Liberal	Chad Eggerman	10,257	27.31	+19.12	
New Democratic	Rachel Loewen Walker	7,187	19.14	–20.16	
Green	Naomi Hunter	403	1.07	+0.02	
Total valid votes/expense limit					
Total rejected ballots					
Turnout		37,554	58.79		
Eligible voters		63,880			
Conservative notional hold		Swing		–6.01	
Source: Elections Canada

2021 Canadian federal election: Saskatoon West
Party	Candidate	Votes	%	±%	Expenditures
Conservative	Brad Redekopp	15,379	45.4	-2.3	$101,524.46
New Democratic	Robert Doucette	13,328	39.3	-1.0	$98,502.73
Liberal	Ruben Rajakumar	2,778	8.2	+0.86	$22,012.29
People's	Kevin Boychuk	2,064	6.1	+4.11	$9,067.48
Green	Dave Greenfield	357	1.1	-1.57	$166.25
Total valid votes/expense limit		33,906	99.16	+0.17	$119,102.72
Total rejected ballots		284	0.84	-0.17	
Turnout		34,190	55.91	-8.05	
Eligible voters		61,148			
Source: Elections Canada
Conservative hold		Swing		-0.96	

2019 Canadian federal election: Saskatoon West
Party	Candidate	Votes	%	±%	Expenditures
Conservative	Brad Redekopp	18,597	47.70	+14.82	$82,759.63
New Democratic	Sheri Benson	15,708	40.29	+0.73	$101,089.71
Liberal	Shah Rukh	2,863	7.34	-17.14	$13,960.24
Green	Shawn Setyo	1,042	2.67	+0.93	$658.36
People's	Isaac Hayes	775	1.99	-	$2,776.00
Total valid votes/expense limit		38,985	98.99		
Total rejected ballots		397	1.01	+0.56	
Turnout		39,382	63.96	-2.48	
Eligible voters		61,577			
Conservative gain from New Democratic		Swing		+7.05	
Source: Elections Canada
