= Saskatoon—Biggar =

Former federal electoral district in Saskatchewan, Canada

Saskatoon—Biggar was a federal electoral district in Saskatchewan, Canada, that was represented in the House of Commons of Canada from 1968 to 1978. This riding was created in 1966 from parts of Prince Albert, Rosetown—Biggar, Rosthern, Saskatoon and The Battlefords ridings.

It was abolished in 1976 when it was redistributed into Humboldt—Lake Centre, Kindersley—Lloydminster, Prince Albert, Saskatoon West and The Battlefords—Meadow Lake ridings.

== Election results ==
1968 Canadian federal election
Party	Candidate	Votes
New Democratic	GLEAVE, Alfred P.	15,928
Progressive Conservative	NASSERDEN, Ed	13,309
Liberal	BLACKLOCK, Ben	8,071

1972 Canadian federal election
Party	Candidate	Votes
New Democratic	GLEAVE, Alf A.P.	16,777
Progressive Conservative	LENNON, Tommy	13,246
Liberal	PATRICK, Bill	8,641
Social Credit	SADLER, Douglas	529

1974 Canadian federal election
Party	Candidate	Votes
Progressive Conservative	HNATYSHYN, Ray	14,296
New Democratic	GLEAVE, Alf	13,084
Liberal	FOURNIER, Ray	9,797
Social Credit	SADLER, Douglas	473

== See also ==
- List of Canadian electoral districts
- Historical federal electoral districts of Canada
