= Kindersley—Lloydminster =

Former federal electoral district in Saskatchewan, Canada

Kindersley—Lloydminster was a federal electoral district in Saskatchewan, Canada, that was represented in the House of Commons of Canada from 1979 to 1997. This riding was created in 1976 from parts of Battleford—Kindersley, Moose Jaw, Saskatoon—Biggar and Swift Current—Maple Creek ridings.

It was abolished in 1996 when it was redistributed into Battlefords—Lloydminster, Cypress Hills—Grasslands, Saskatoon—Rosetown and Wanuskewin ridings.

== Election results ==
1979 Canadian federal election
Party	Candidate	Votes
Progressive Conservative	MCKNIGHT, Bill	16,614
New Democratic	GLEAVE, Alf	10,254
Liberal	COULTER, Alan C.	6,809

1980 Canadian federal election
Party	Candidate	Votes
Progressive Conservative	MCKNIGHT, Bill	14,220
New Democratic	NARGANG, Wayne G.	9,589
Liberal	TOBIN, John B.	6,631
Rhinoceros	BOWDEN, Ross Dunning	294

1984 Canadian federal election
Party	Candidate	Votes
Progressive Conservative	MCKNIGHT, Bill	20,436
New Democratic	ATKINSON, Roy	10,229
Liberal	FOX, Lyal	3,979
Confederation of Regions	GUILLAUME, Henry G.	419

1988 Canadian federal election
Party	Candidate	Votes	
Progressive Conservative	MCKNIGHT, Bill	15,089	45.0%
New Democratic	WHITMORE, Grant	11,198	33.4%
Liberal	KAUFMAN, Bev	5,039	15.0%
Reform	HERMANSON, Elwin N.	2,217	6.6%

1993 Canadian federal election
Party	Candidate	Votes
Reform	HERMANSON, Elwin	12,292
Liberal	SETRAKOV, Judy	8,423
New Democratic	THOMAS, Elizabeth	4,961
Progressive Conservative	SANDBERG, J. S. Jack	4,134
National	BARSKY, Rick	392
Canada Party	FAHLMAN, Emanuel	134

== See also ==
- List of Canadian electoral districts
- Historical federal electoral districts of Canada
