= Hitchcock Bay =

Community in Saskatchewan, Canada

Coordinates: 51°02′55″N 106°51′47″W

Hitchcock Bay is a hamlet in the Canadian province of Saskatchewan. It is on the northern shore of Lake Diefenbaker at the inflow of Hitchcock Creek.

== History ==
First settled in 1903 by O. A. "Jack" Hitchcock, a Quebec-born steam engineer turned rancher. His log cabin completed in 1904 still stands.

== Demographics ==
In the 2021 Census of Population conducted by Statistics Canada, Hitchcock Bay had a population of 108 living in 52 of its 162 total private dwellings, a change of 68.8% from its 2016 population of 64. With a land area of 1.28 km^{2} (0.49 sq mi), it had a population density of 84.4/km^{2} (218.5/sq mi) in 2021.

== See also ==
- List of communities in Saskatchewan
