= William Michael Wall =

Canadian politician

William Michael Wall (July 11, 1911 – July 7, 1962) was a Canadian public school principal and senator. He was the first Canadian of Ukrainian origin to be appointed to the Senate of Canada.

== Early life and education ==
He was born in Ethelbert, Manitoba and graduated from high school at the age of 14. He graduated from the University of Manitoba at the age of 17. He earned his bachelor education with a gold medal and did his post-graduate studies at Yale University and Harvard University where he graduated with a doctorate in 1954.

== Career ==
Wall began teaching in 1937, and enlisted in the Canadian Army during World War II rising to the rank of lieutenant-colonel.

Wall was an educator and was the youngest principal in Winnipeg, Manitoba when he was named to head school principal when he was named to head Lord Nelson School in 1953. He was administrative assistant to the superintendent of Winnipeg's public school system when he was called to the Senate in 1955 on the advice of Prime Minister Louis St. Laurent. He sat in the body until his death at the age of 50. At 44, he was one of the youngest Senators ever appointed to the upper house.
