= Tichfield Junction =

Community in Saskatchewan, Canada

Coordinates: 51°16′23″N 107°02′32″W

Tichfield Junction is an unincorporated community in Rural Municipality of Coteau No. 255, Saskatchewan, Canada. The community is located 30 km south of the town of Outlook east of Highway 44 at the intersection of Township Road 270 and the Canadian National Railway junction on the south shore of Coteau Lake.

== See also ==
- List of communities in Saskatchewan
