= George Blanchard =

George Blanchard may refer to:

- George Blanchard, Sr, Governor of the Absentee Shawnee Tribe 2009–2013
- George S. Blanchard (1920–2006), U.S. Army general
- George Washington Blanchard (1884–1964), U.S. politician
- Georges Maurice Jean Blanchard (1877–1954), French general
- George Blanchard (architect) (1891–1978), Canadian architect and Ontario mayor
