= Holiday Park =

Holiday Park may refer to:

- Resort, a vacation resort
- Holiday Park (Durham), a defunct football ground in England
- Holiday Park, Germany, an amusement park in Germany
- Holiday Park, Saskatoon, a neighbourhood in Saskatoon
- Holiday Park in Albuquerque, New Mexico, USA.
- In the United Kingdom, Ireland, Australia and New Zealand, a tourist campsite facility offering a wide range of accommodation styles
