= Walter William LaChance =

Canadian architect

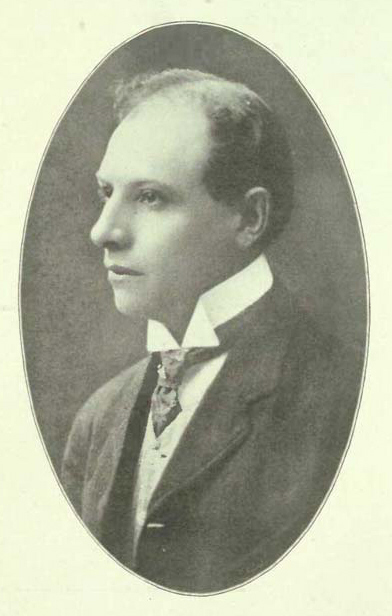
- Born: April 12, 1870; Brockville, Ontario
- Died: September 23, 1951 (aged 81); Fonthill, Ontario
- Occupation: Architect
- Practice: Solo practitioner, also French and LaChance (Cleveland); Gregg and LaChance (Cleveland); LaChance and Howenstein (Saskatoon); White and LaChance (Niagara Falls, New York); LaChance and Kearns (Welland, Ontario)
- Buildings: Flanagan House Hotel (1907); Now Hotel Senator; Saskatoon, Saskatchewan; Victoria Public School (1910); Saskatoon, Saskatchewan

Walter William LaChance (April 12, 1870 – September 23, 1951) was a Canadian architect best known for his designs of rural schools, although he also designed numerous buildings of other types. His commissions were concentrated in Cleveland, Ohio, Hamilton, Ontario, Welland, Ontario, and various communities in Saskatchewan. Between 1906 and 1914, LaChance designed at least 16 schools in Saskatchewan communities, earning himself as a prominent figure in educational architecture during that period. He was also the author of two books: Modern Schoolhouses (Toronto, 1919) and Schoolhouses and Their Equipment (Niagara Falls, New York, 1925).

While LaChance received numerous commissions, some of them for large buildings, his career was marked by a lack of stability. He moved his architectural practice from city to city numerous times during his career, and was a partner in five different partnerships, all of them short-lived.

== Biography ==
On April 12, 1870, LaChance was born in Brockville, Ontario. He moved to Cleveland, Ohio, where he claimed to have graduated from the Case School of Applied Science (predecessor to Case Western Reserve University) in 1884, although there are serious doubts about whether he did, in fact, graduate. If LaChance's claim is truthful, this means he would have received his degree at age 14 or 15.

LaChance next moved to Virginia and Georgia where his practice consisted mainly of designing jails. In a 1909 advertisement by LaChance, he listed numerous buildings he claimed to have designed, of which seven were jails in Virginia, West Virginia, Ohio, and Georgia. Apart from LaChance's self-promotional efforts, little is known about this stage of his career, and the fact that he would have been a teenager during this period raises a number of questions.

In 1889, LaChance returned to Cleveland and worked for the architectural firm, Cramer and Fugman, until 1890. Next, he worked at Van Dorn Iron Works of Cleveland, where he patented an electric lock for prison doors. Following his employment at the iron works, LaChance conducted his architectural practice in Cleveland, both as a solo practitioner as well as in two short-lived partnerships. One partnership was with Alfred A. French (French and LaChance), and another was with Vincent E. Gregg (Gregg and LaChance).

LaChance was married to Sarah ("Sadie") Stoddard (1875–1941) of Milan, Ohio. They later divorced.

In 1897 he moved to Hamilton, Ontario, in 1905 he moved to Regina, Saskatchewan, and later that same year he moved to Saskatoon. In Saskatoon, he was in a brief partnership with C.H. Howenstein (LaChance and Howenstein) from 1912 to 1913.

LaChance's years in Saskatoon were particularly prosperous for him, as the province was in the midst of an economic boom. Regarding this period of LaChance's career, one biographer has written, "LaChance had a flamboyant, outspoken and confident character." The architect is described as "pushy" and quick to threaten legal action during arguments.

Later (year is uncertain), LaChance moved, this time to Welland, Ontario. In 1919, his 262-page opus, Modern Schoolhouses, was published. There was yet another short-lived partnership, this time with Norman A. Kearns of Welland, which lasted from 1919 to 1920.

LaChance continued to move his architectural office, to St. Catharines, Ontario in 1920, and to Niagara Falls, New York in 1921. In 1925 he formed yet another partnership, creating the firm of (James R.) White and LaChance. Also in 1925, while a partner of this firm, LaChance's second book was published, Schoolhouses and Their Equipment. His final years were in Welland, Ontario. He died on September 23, 1951, in a convalescent home located in Fonthill, Ontario, and was buried at Woodlawn Cemetery in Welland.

== Notable commissions ==
(All are extant unless otherwise specified.)

In chronological order:

- Van Rooy Coffee Company (1895), 2900 Detroit Avenue, Cleveland, Ohio.
- Hamilton Golf Club House (1897, demolished), Hamilton, Ontario. This was a modest one-story wood structure, not to be confused with the much larger clubhouse currently in use.
- Flanagan House Hotel (1907), 243 21st Street East at Third Avenue South, Saskatoon, now Hotel Senator.
- Saskatoon City Hospital (1907, demolished), Queen Street and Seventh Avenue, Saskatoon.
- Bowerman Block (1906), 130 21st Street East, Saskatoon. Both exterior and interior have been extensively renovated.
- Chubb Block (1907), 227 21st Street East, Saskatoon. Now Marvel Beauty School.
- Bowerman House (1907), 1328 Avenue K South, Saskatoon. Designated as a Municipal Heritage Property. The house was designed to be used as a hunting lodge by Allan Bowerman, a developer, former postmaster, and former school principal. It is an example of the "western stick style," which is rooted in the Arts and Crafts Movement. For many years, the house was the superintendent's residence for the now-defunct Saskatoon Sanatorium.
- Victoria School (1909–1910), 639 Broadway Avenue at 12th Street East, Saskatoon.
- Willoughby-Sumner Building (1911–1912), 256 Third Avenue South at 20th Street East, Saskatoon. Both exterior and interior have been extensively renovated. Now, the K.W. Nasser Centre of the University of Saskatchewan.
- Ferguson Block (1910, destroyed by fire), 140 Second Avenue South, Saskatoon. This three story building was destroyed in a 1931 fire, and should not be confused with the 1931 structure of the same name (different architect) that currently sits at the same address.
- Odd Fellows Temple (1912), 416 21st Street East, Saskatoon. Designated by the City of Saskatoon as a Municipal Heritage Property.
- Battleford Town Hall and Opera House (1912), 92 23rd Street West, Battleford, Saskatchewan.
- Beamsville High School (1917), 4317 Central Avenue at Maple Street, Beamsville, Ontario. Now, Beamsville District Secondary School. LaChance designed the portion of the building with the prominent pillars, and he described the building in detail in a 1917 article.
- Central Fire Hall (1920), Hellems Avenue and Division Street, Welland, Ontario. Designated as a heritage property by the City of Welland.

== Gallery ==
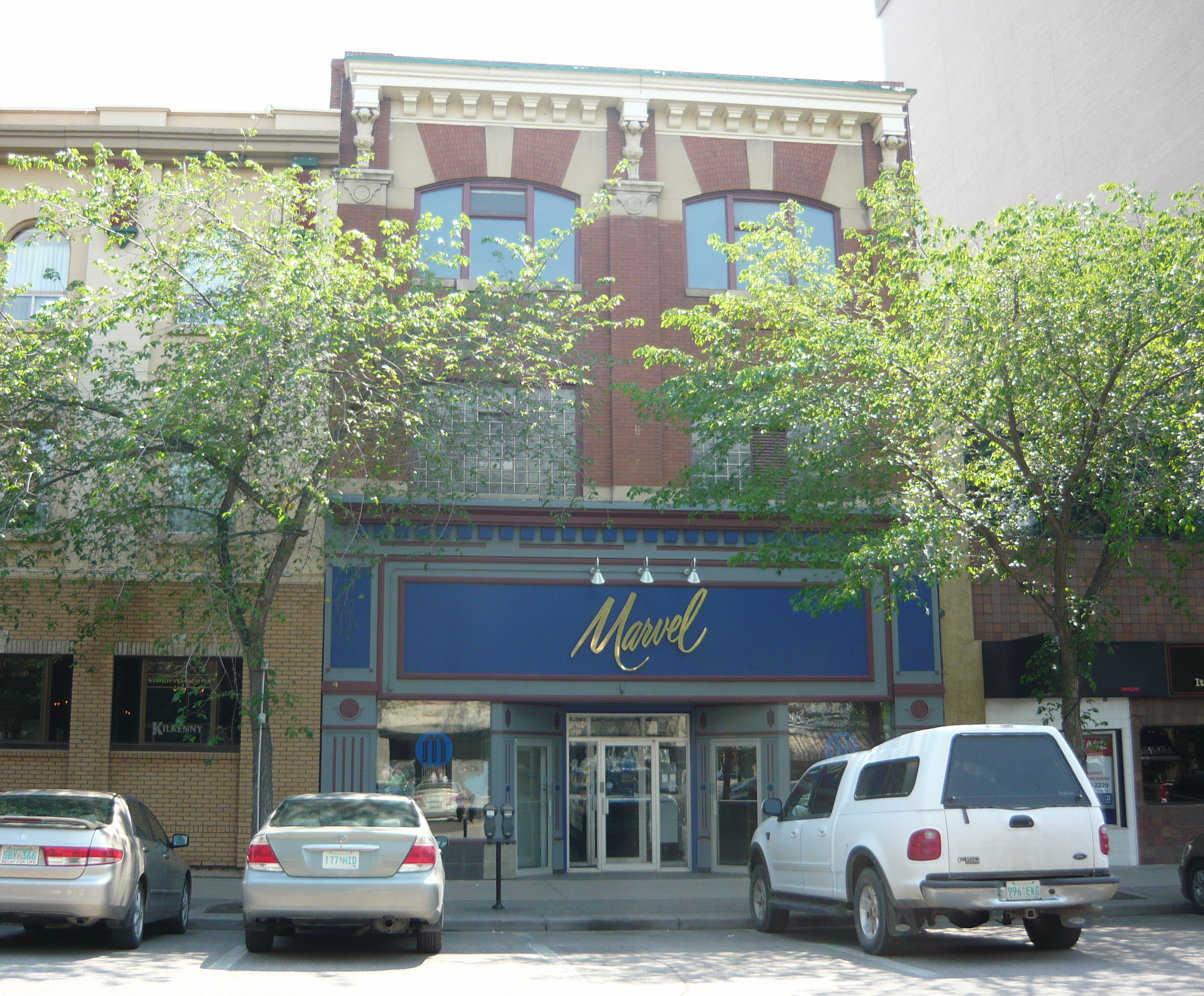
Chubb Block (1907)
Saskatoon

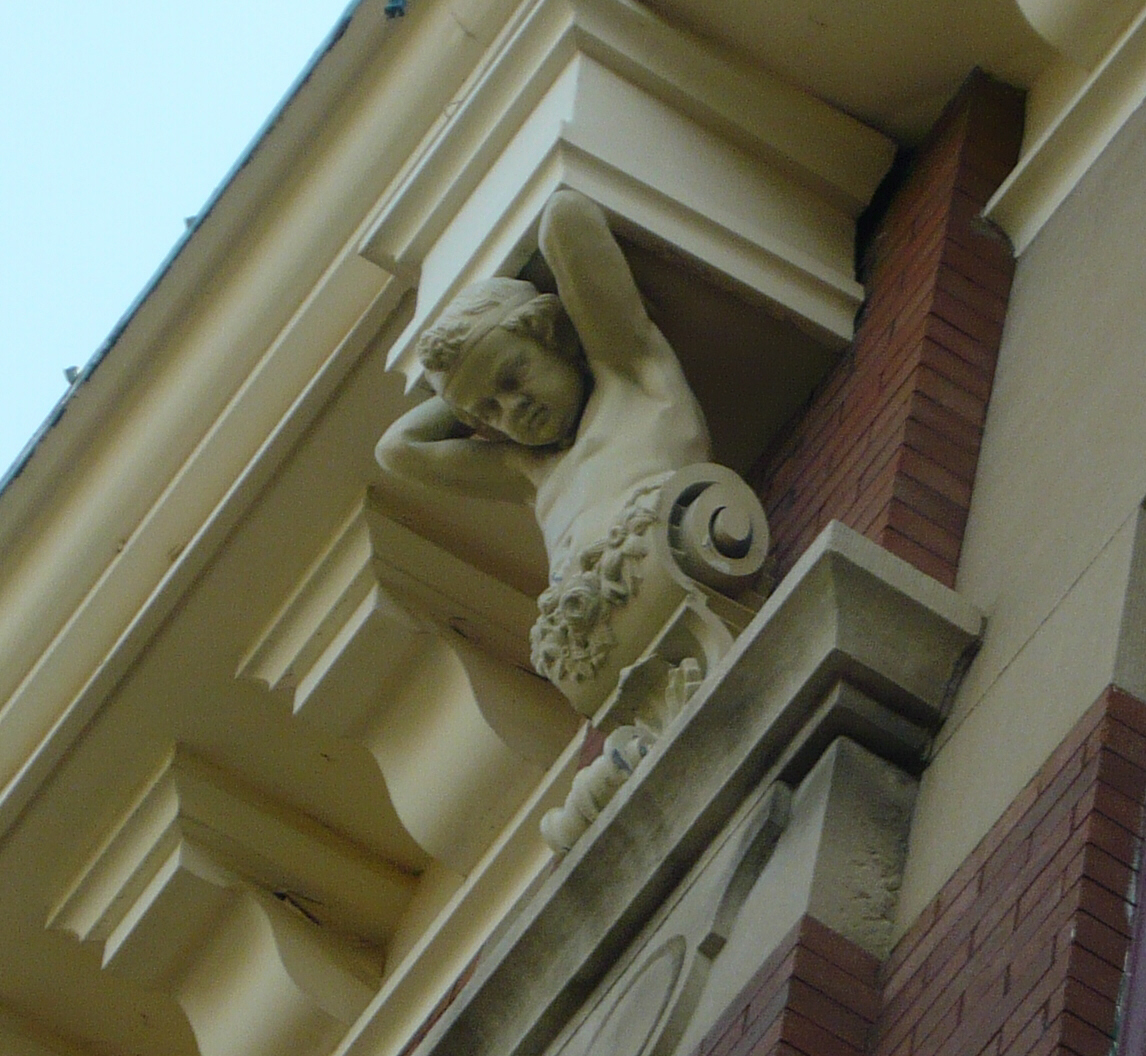
Cornice detail
Chubb Block (1907)
Saskatoon

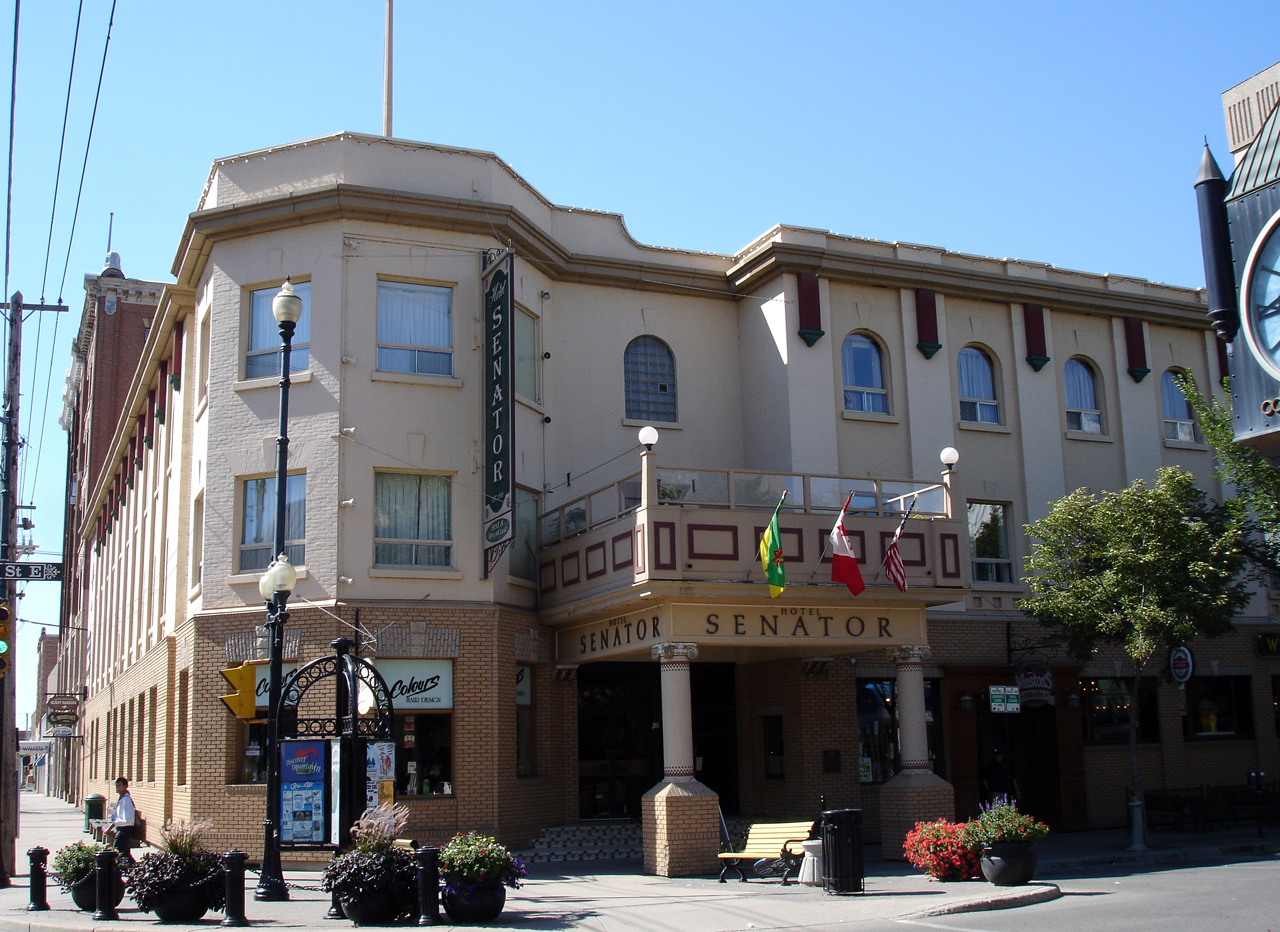
Flanagan House Hotel (1907)
Now Hotel Senator
Saskatoon

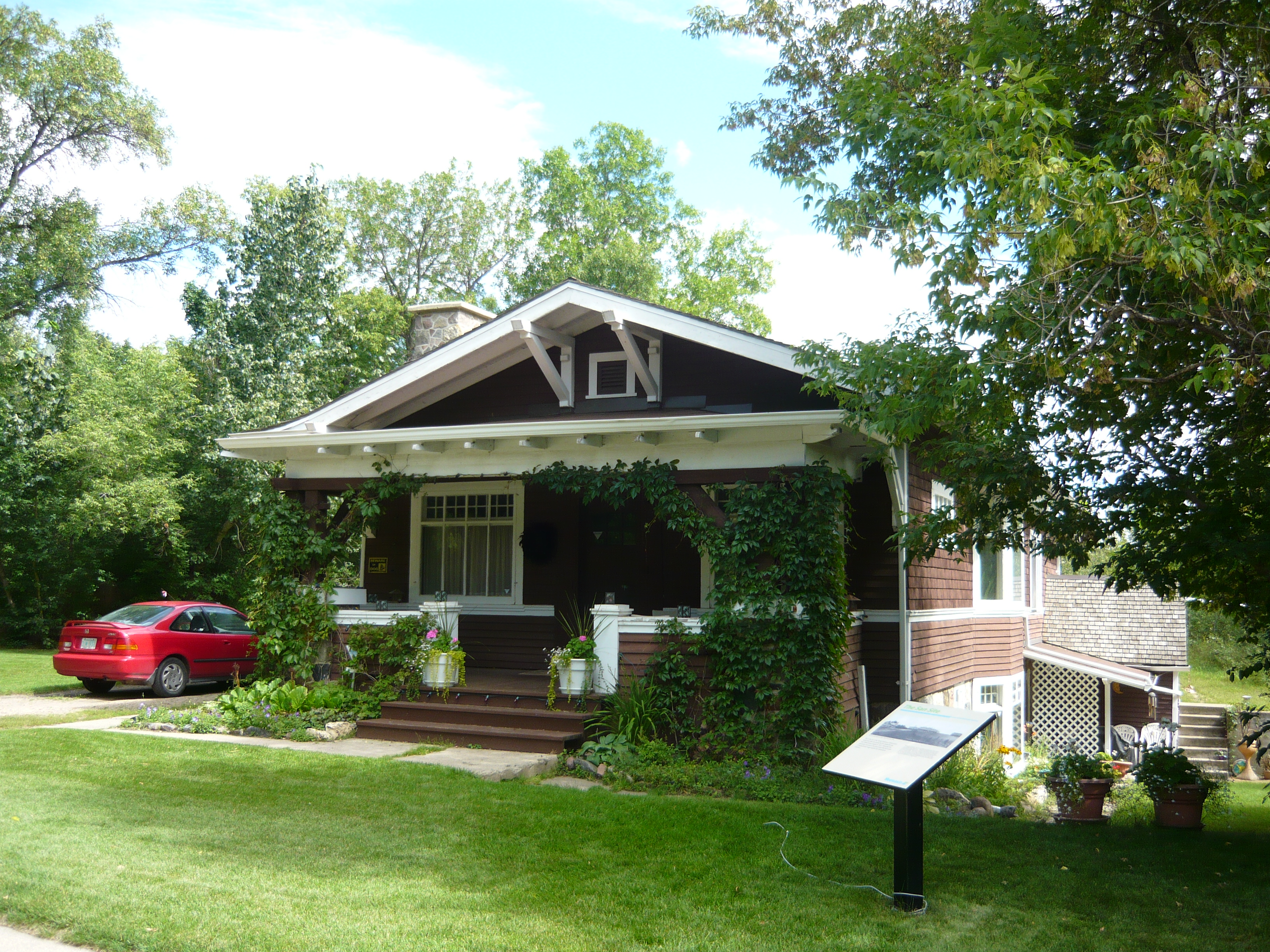
Bowerman House (1907)
Saskatoon

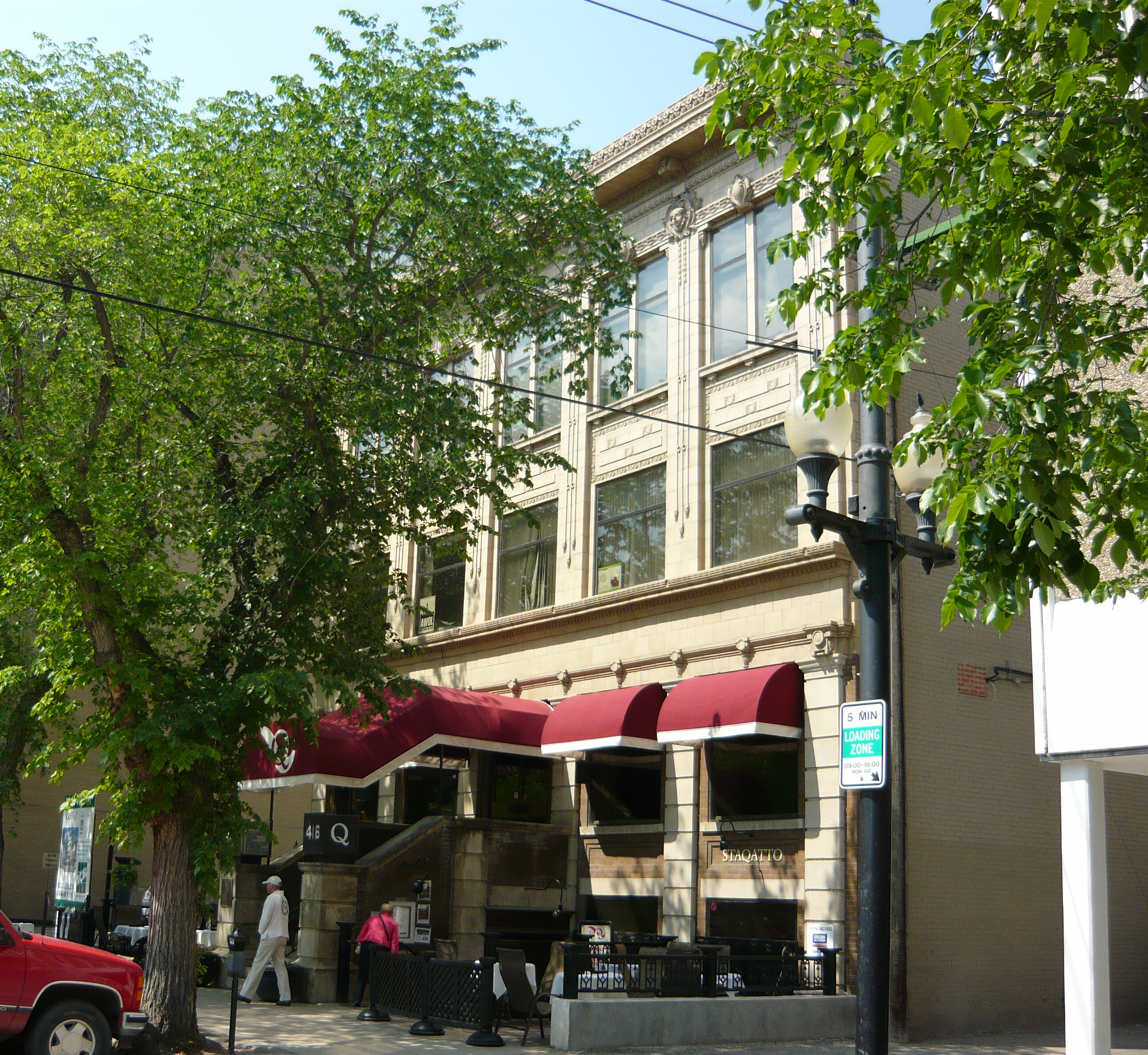
Odd Fellows Temple (1912)
Saskatoon

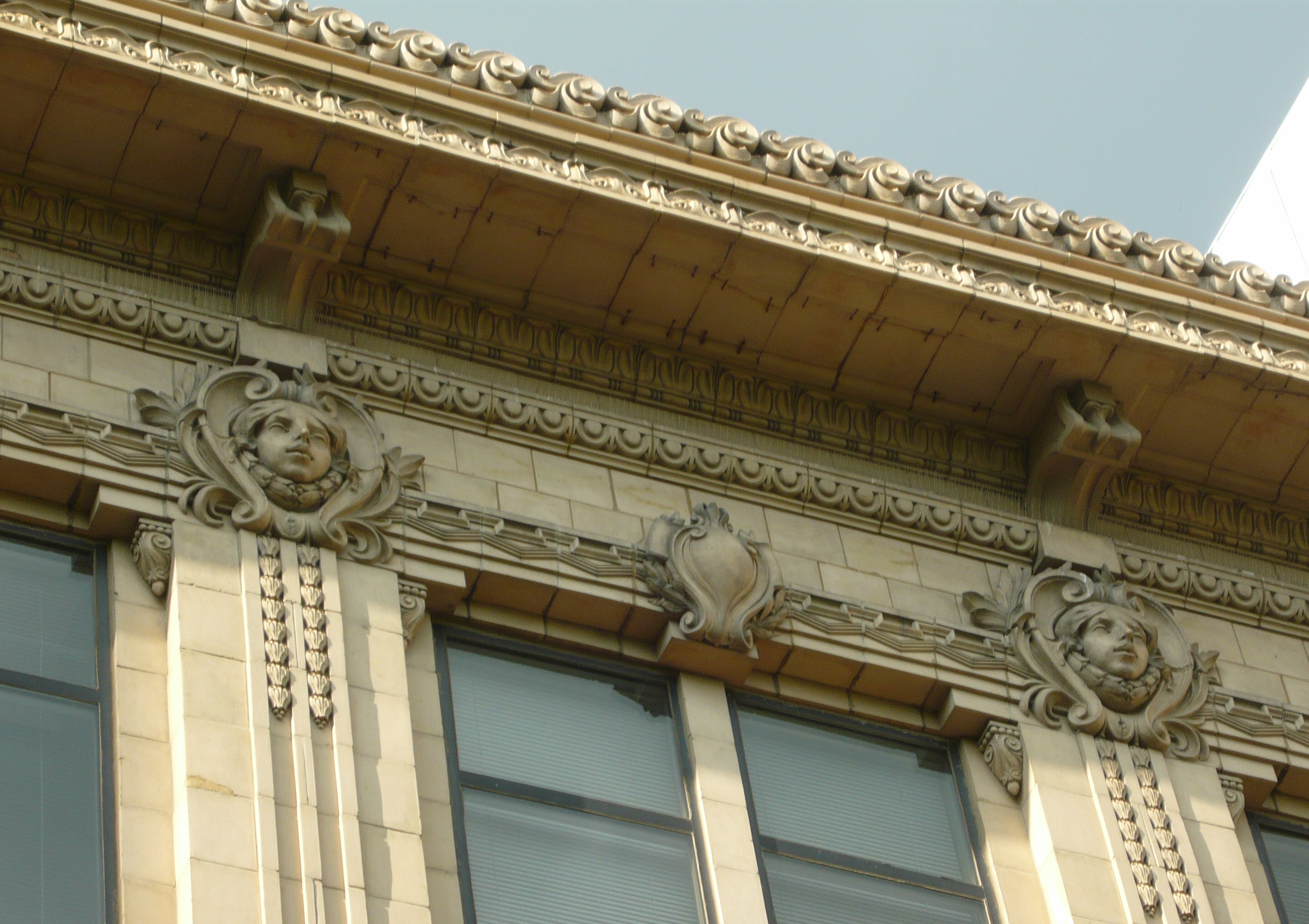
Cornice detail
Odd Fellows Temple (1912)
Saskatoon

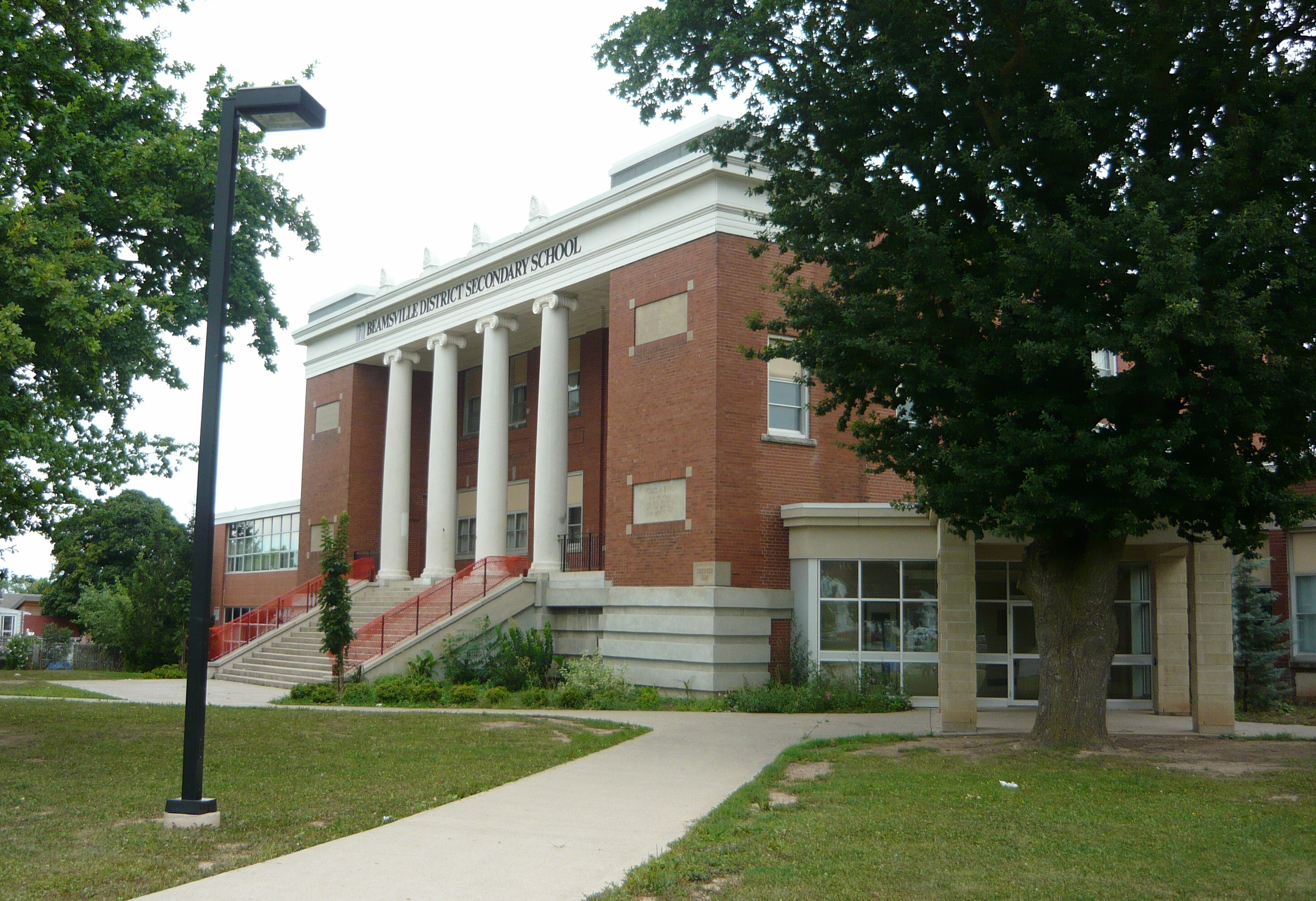
Beamsville High School (1917)
Beamsville, Ontario

== Writings by LaChance ==
- LaChance, Walter W. (1919). Modern Schoolhouses, Ontario edition. Toronto, Ontario: William Briggs.
- LaChance, W.W. (July 1917). "A well equipped high school at Beamsville" (PDF). Construction (Toronto). 10 (7): 233–235.
- LaChance, W.W. (1925). Schoolhouses and Their Equipment: With Plans and Illustrations of the Newest Schoolhouse Architecture, New York State Edition. Niagara Falls, New York: Baker, Jones, Hausauer. hdl:2027/wu.89087917449.
