= George Blanchard (architect) =

English-born architect and Ontario mayor

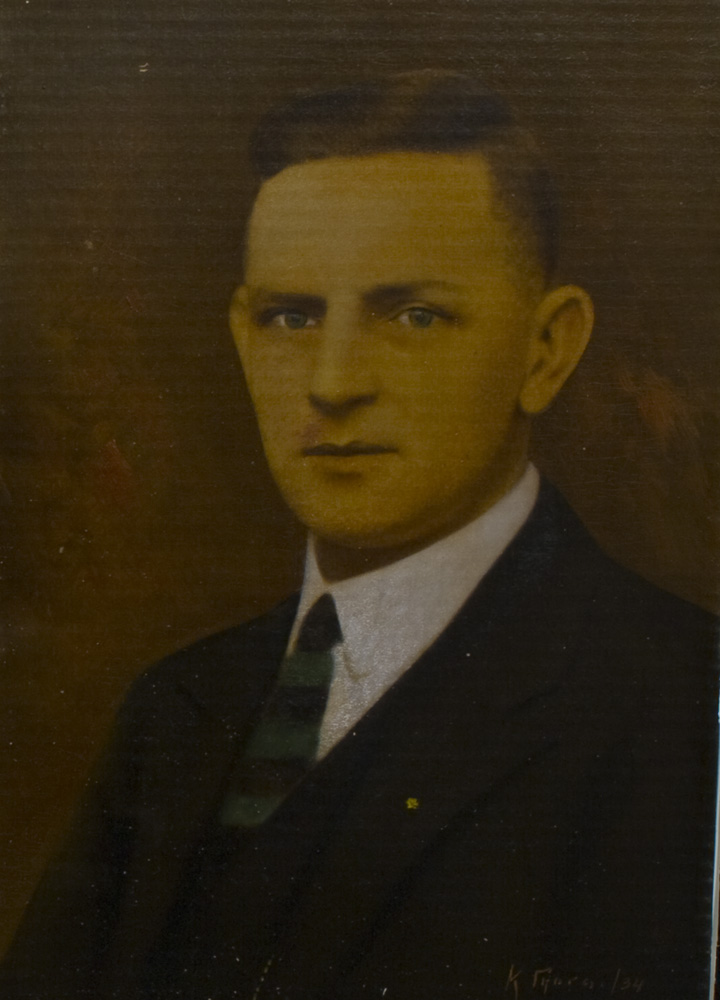
Blanchard in 1933

George Blanchard (March 3, 1891 – July 19, 1978) was an English-born architect and politician in Ontario, Canada. He served as mayor of Port Arthur in 1933.

He was born in Kingston-upon-Hull and came to Canada in 1903. Blanchard trained as an architect's assistant in Regina and then worked as a draftsman for the Saskatchewan Department of Public Works. From 1912 to 1915, he was chief assistant to Walter William LaChance in Saskatoon. Blanchard next worked for C. D. Howe & Company and came to Port Arthur in 1917 to supervise the construction of several grain elevators; in 1920, he took over William Hood's architectural business. He designed a number of prominent public and commercial buildings in the area. From 1952 to 1961, he was resident architect in Northwestern Ontario for the Ontario government.

Blanchard served on Port Arthur council from 1931 to 1932. He was defeated by Charles Cox when he ran for reelection as mayor in 1934, gathering 2,008 votes to Cox's 2,957. He also served 17 years as treasurer for Shuniah municipality and was president of the local Children's Aid Society.

He died in Vernon, British Columbia at the age of 87.
