= Odd Fellows Temple (Saskatoon) =

Coordinates: 52°07′36″N 106°39′36″W

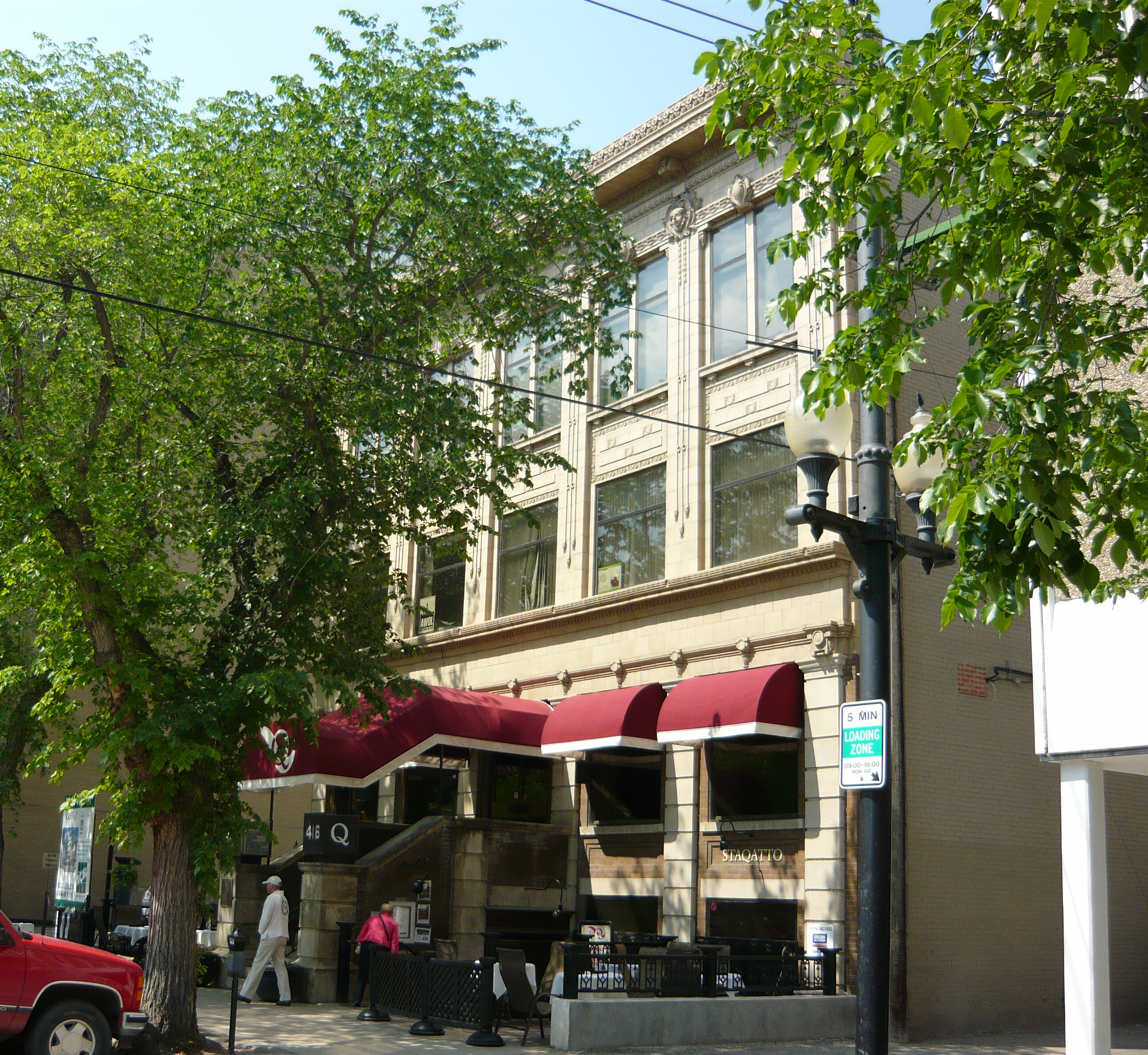
- Odd Fellows Temple Building (2010)
- Interactive map of the Odd Fellows Temple area

General information
- Location: 416 21st Street East, Saskatoon, Saskatchewan, Canada
- Completed: 1912
- Client: Independent Order of Odd Fellows

Design and construction
- Architect: Walter William LaChance

The Odd Fellows Temple Building is a landmark building located in downtown Saskatoon, Saskatchewan, Canada. Built by the Independent Order of Odd Fellows the building served as a meeting place, ball room and temple until being sold in 1959 to the Saskatoon Labour Council. The building was officially designated a heritage property on April 19, 1983.

The building served as home to Saskatoon's first library from 1913 to 1923.
