= Hotel Senator (Saskatoon) =

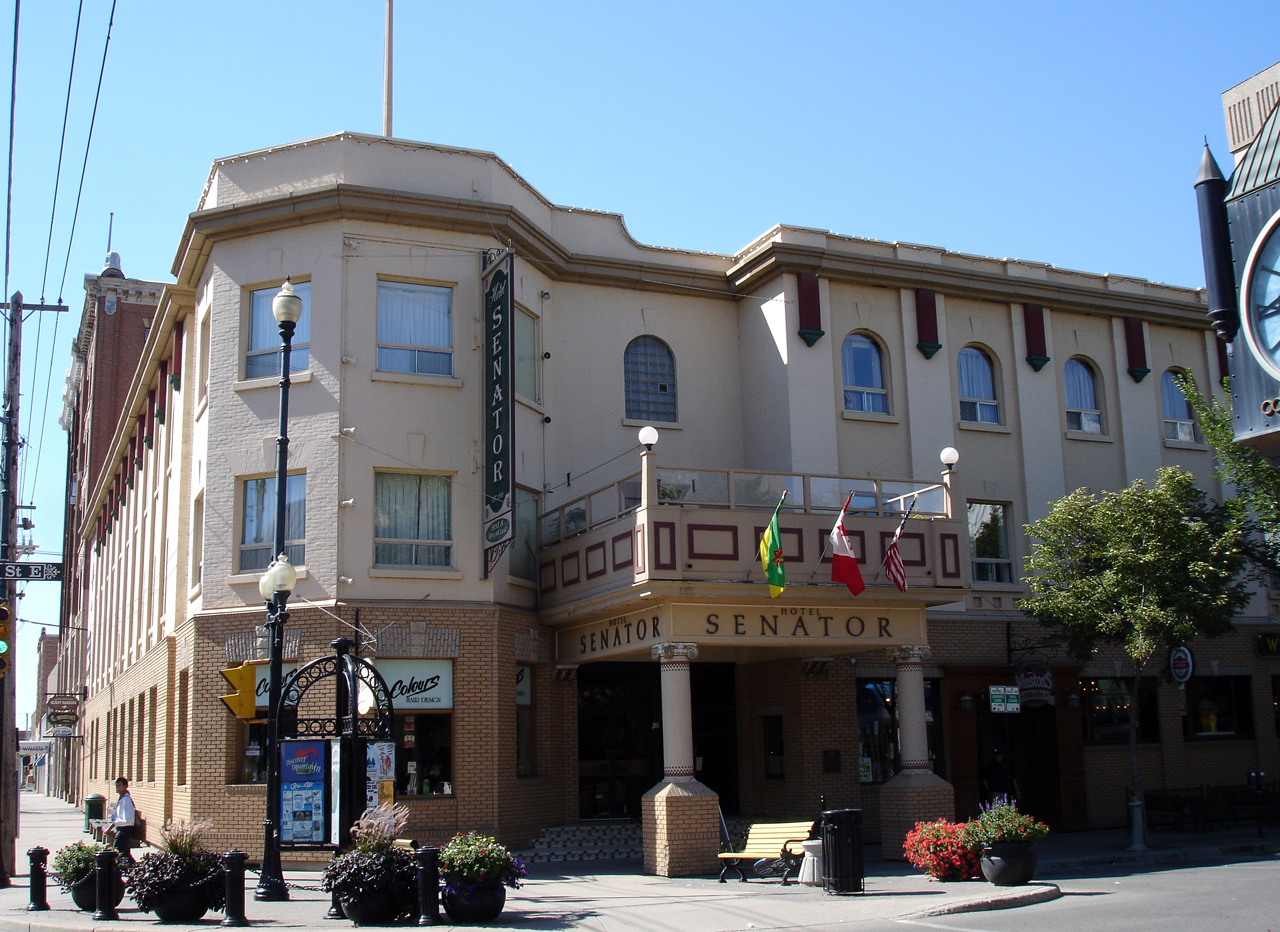
- Hotel Senator
- Interactive map of the Hotel Senator area

General information
- Location: 243 21st Street East; Saskatoon, Saskatchewan, Canada
- Coordinates: 52°07′36.26″N 106°39′47.74″W
- Opening: 1907

Design and construction
- Architect: Walter William LaChance
- Developer: James Flanagan

Other information
- Number of rooms: 38
- Number of restaurants: 2

Website
- www.hotelsenator.ca

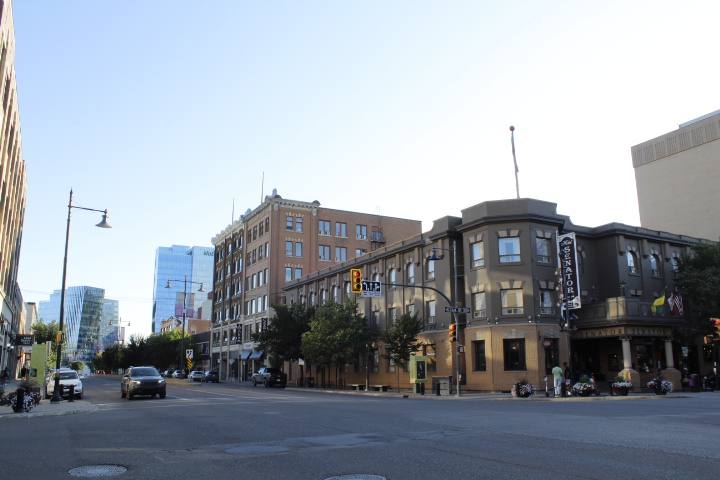

The Hotel Senator is a landmark building located in downtown Saskatoon, Saskatchewan, Canada. The building was built as the Flanagan Hotel by James Flanagan, an early settler in Saskatoon, and designed by Walter William LaChance, an architect who designed many local Saskatoon buildings at the turn of the century. When originally built, the hotel included many luxury features for 1907, including steam heating, hot and cold running water, telephones in each room and extensive use of marble and wood paneling. James Flanagan died in 1909; the hotel was subsequently sold in 1910 for $150,000 by his estate.

Today the property is designated a protected building. It houses a European-style boutique hotel with 38 rooms.
