= Bowerman House =

Historical property in Saskatoon, Saskatchewan

Coordinates: 52°6′31″N 106°41′10″W

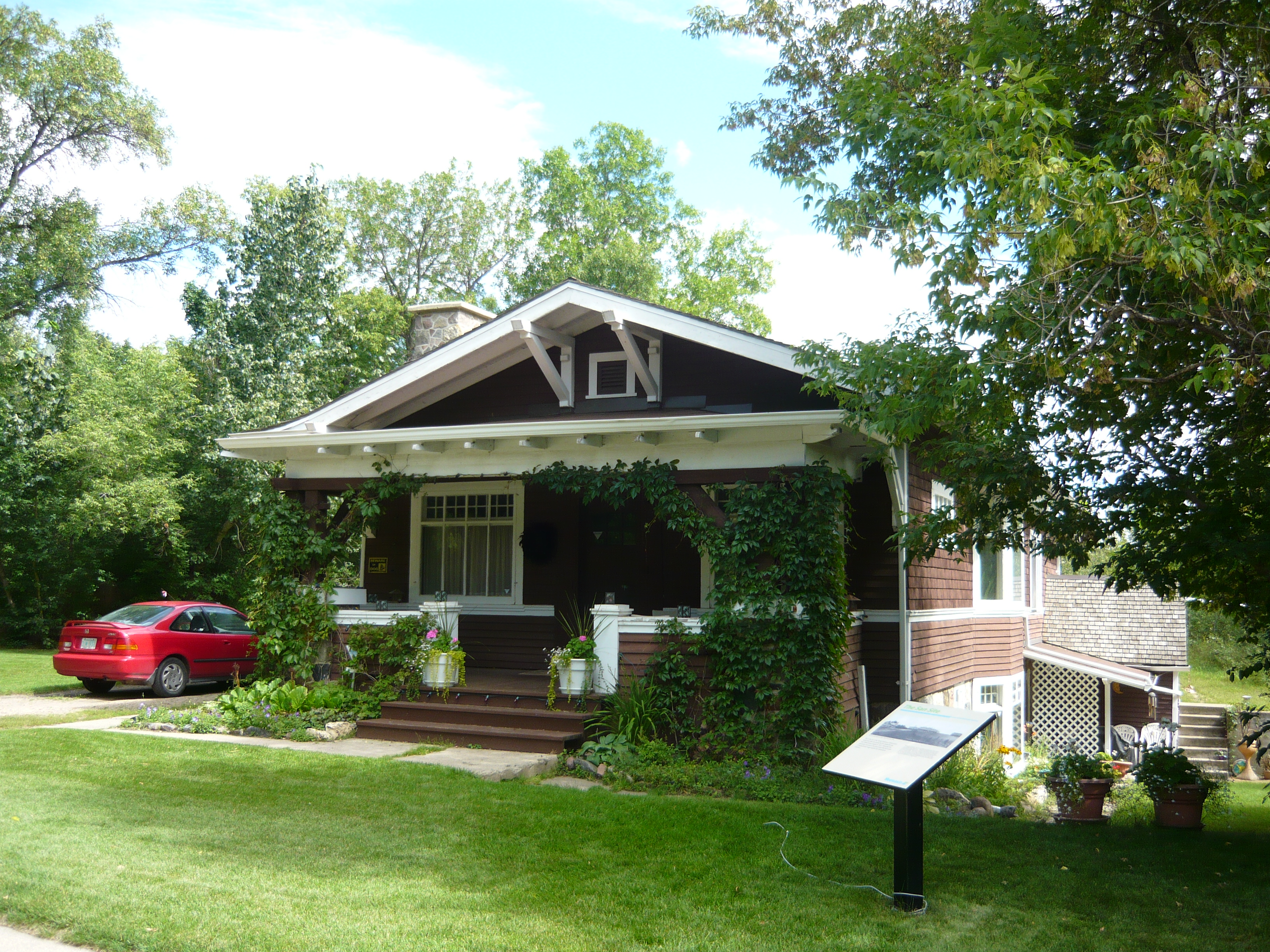
- Bowerman House
- Interactive map of the Bowerman House area

General information
- Architectural style: Arts and Crafts Movement
- Location: 1328 Avenue K South, Saskatoon, Saskatchewan, Canada
- Completed: 1907
- Client: Allan Bowerman

Design and construction
- Architect: Walter William LaChance

The Bowerman House (built in 1907) is a designated Municipal Heritage Property located in the Holiday Park, neighborhood of Saskatoon, Saskatchewan, Canada. The home is of a crafts-man "Western Stick" style. The house was built as a hunting lodge by Allan Bowerman, graduate from Kingston Military College, first postmaster in Saskatoon on the west side of the river, and member of Saskatoon's first town council (1903 – 1905). Bowerman was also responsible for the development of the Canada Building. The home was designed by Walter William LaChance. Bowerman sold the home in 1917 after the end of a construction boom in the city.

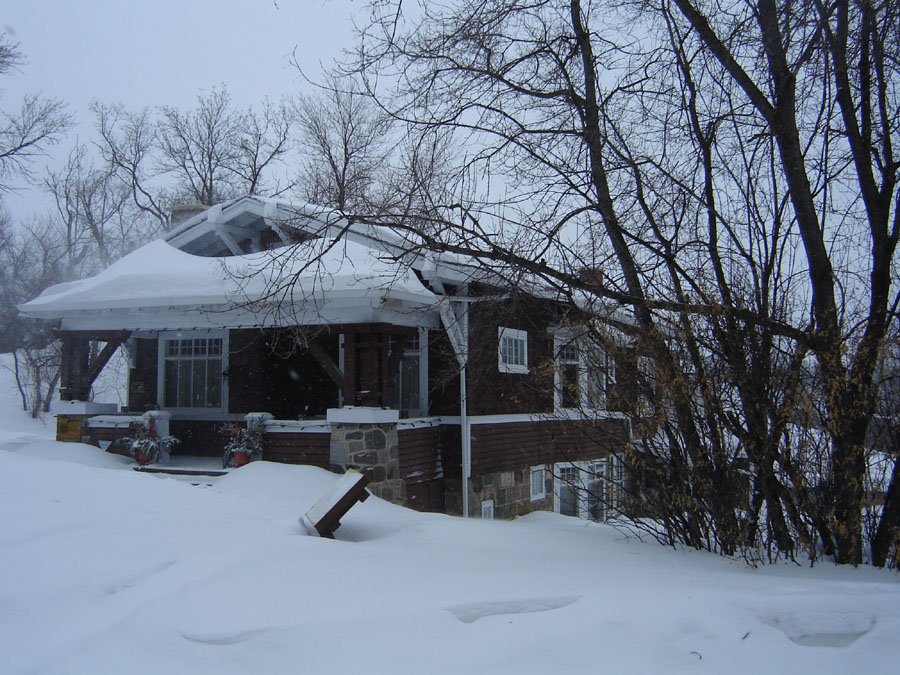
Bowerman House in winter

In 1923 the building was obtained by the Saskatchewan Anti-Tuberculosis League and became part of the Saskatoon Sanatorium serving as a doctor's residence until 1987. It was used as the sanatorium superintendent residence, for Dr. Boughton and his family, from 1925 to 1959.

The property is now owned by the Meewasin Valley Authority and is used as a private residence.
