= Holiday Park, Saskatoon =

Holiday Park
- Neighbourhood
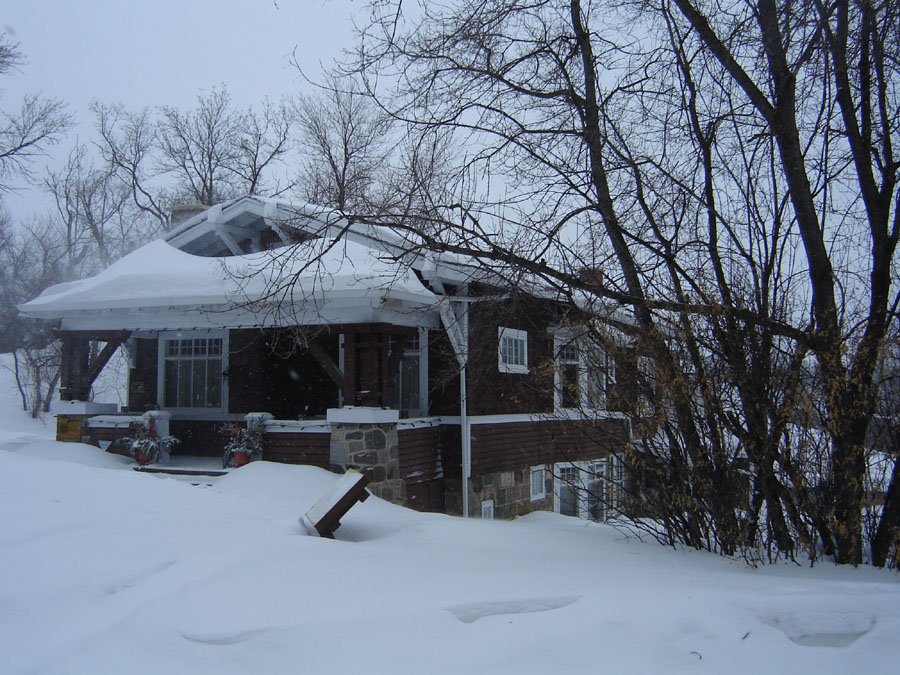
- Municipal Heritage Properties Bowerman House
- Interactive map of Holiday Park
- Coordinates: 52°6′39″N 106°41′28″W
- Country: Canada
- Province: Saskatchewan
- City: Saskatoon
- Suburban Development Area: Confederation SDA
- Neighbourhood: Holiday Park

Government
  - Type: Municipal (Ward 2)
  - Administrative body: Saskatoon City Council
  - Councillor: Senos Timon

Population (2006)
  - Total: 1,400
  - Average Income: $44,889
- Time zone: UTC−6 (UTC)

Holiday Park is a neighbourhood in south-central Saskatoon, Saskatchewan, Canada. Located within Saskatoon's Ward 2, Councillor Senos Timon represents the area's interests at City Hall.

Holiday Park has an official neighbourhood association which sets out leisure activities, and provides community members with a forum to discuss community issues such as neighbourhood watch, block parent programs, etc. This neighbourhood is surrounded by a plethora of amenities. To the south is Holiday Park golf course, commanding a championship 18-hole and executive 9-hole course. It is used year-round, providing snow golf and well-groomed cross country ski trails in the winter months. To the north is the Riversdale Tennis Club and Riversdale pool, an outdoor swimming pool with water slide features. To the west is the Gordie Howe Management Area with Gordie Howe Bowl, Baseball Diamonds, Speed Skating Oval. To the east, the Meewasin Valley Authority provides walking and biking trails along the South Saskatchewan River. Canoeists, water skiers, and kayakers have a wonderful time enjoying the convenience of the Saskatchewan River. Holiday Park's population is 1,400.

== History ==
The Holiday Park community was planned out on maps as early as 1911, and development was soon under way. The Saskatoon Tuberculosis Sanitorium was opened April 15, 1925 and was a landmark of the community, widely visible from the opposite side of the river. After the Sanatorium closed, it was used for various purposes before the building was demolished in the 1990s; its grounds remain in use as a park.

June 27, 1962 was the official opening of the Holiday Park Golf Course.

The Bowerman House was a hunting lodge constructed by Allen Bowerman, and later used as physician housing for The Saskatoon Sanatorium

== Government and politics ==
Holiday Park exists within the federal electoral district of Saskatoon West. It is currently represented by Brad Redekopp of the Conservative Party of Canada, first elected in the 2019 Canadian federal election.

Provincially, the area is within the constituency of Saskatoon Riversdale. It is currently represented by Kim Breckner of the Saskatchewan New Democratic Party, first elected in the 2024 Saskatchewan general election

In Saskatoon's non-partisan municipal politics, Holiday Park lies within Ward 2. It is currently represented by Senos Timon, elected in 2024.

== Education ==
Saskatoon French School
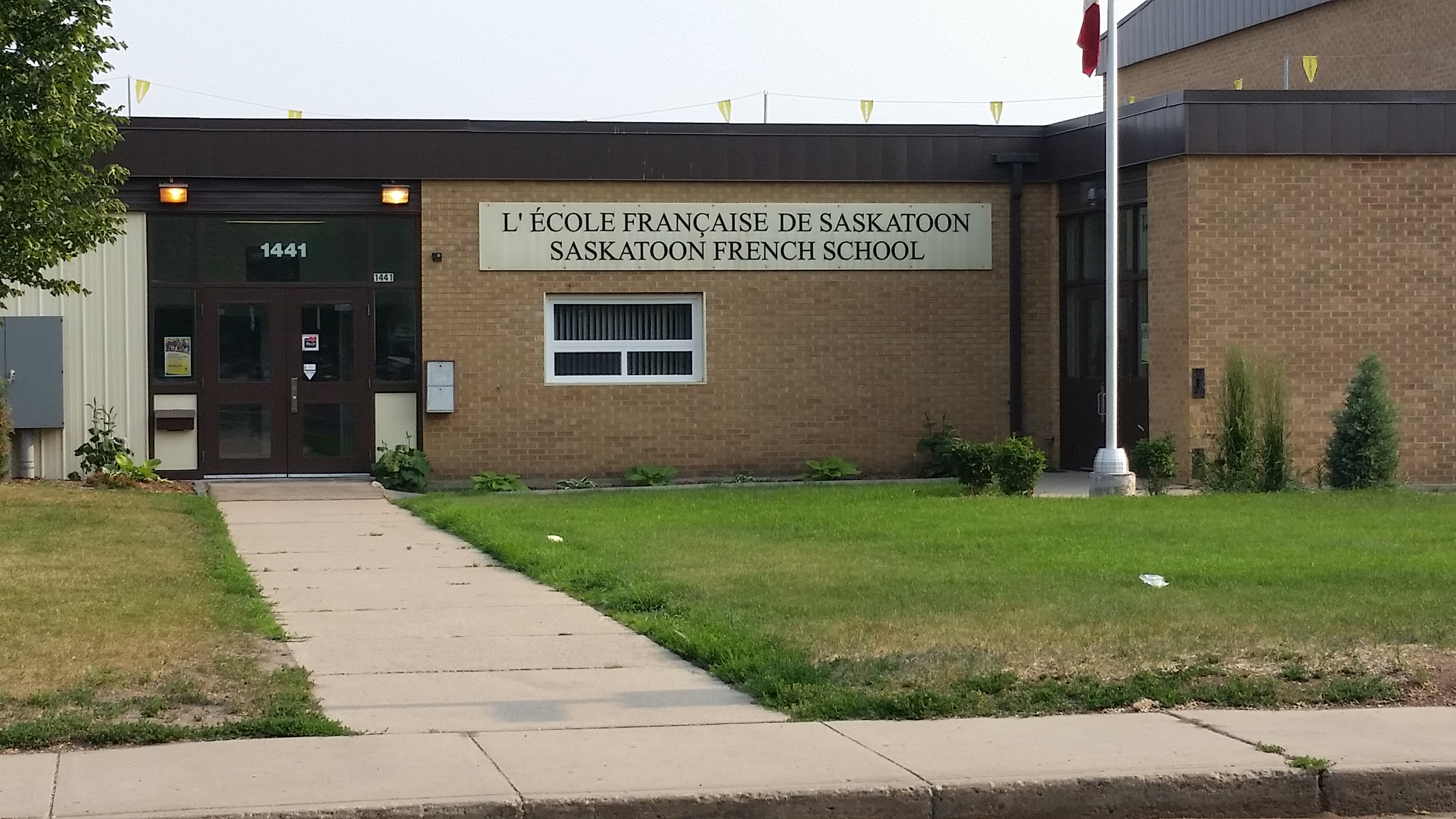
- 1441 Wellington Street; Saskatoon, Saskatchewan, S7K 6G1; Canada

Information
- Type: Elementary
- Religious affiliation: Catholic
- Opened: 1967
- School board: Greater Saskatoon Catholic Schools (Associate School)
- Principal: Jacqueline Castilloux
- Grades: Kindergarten to Grade 8
- Enrollment: 323 (2017)
- Education system: Separate
- Language: English, French Immersion
- Team name: Sundogs
- Feeder to: Various
- Website: Saskatoon French School

St. John Community School
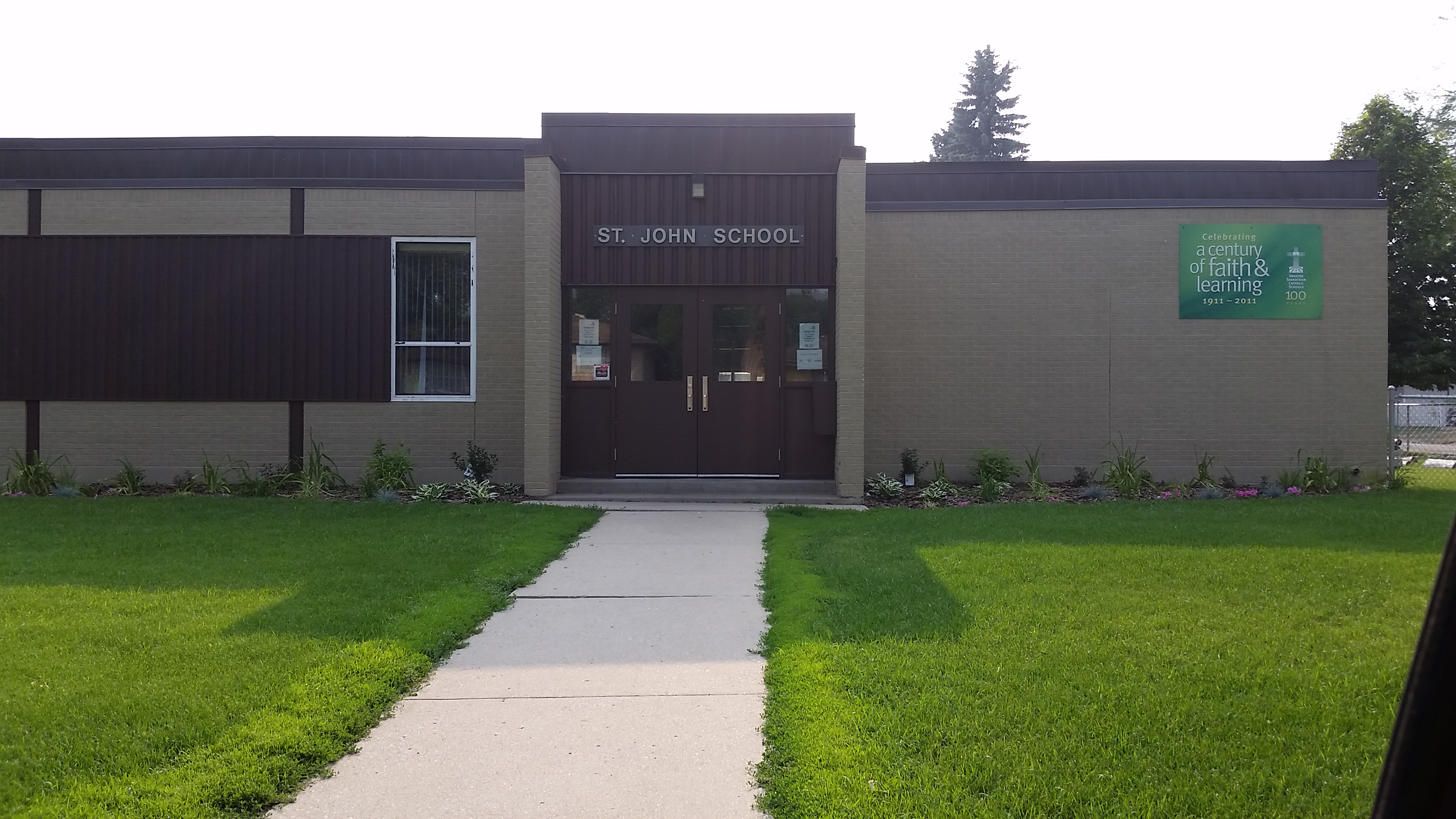
- 1205 Avenue N South; Saskatoon, Saskatchewan, S7M 2R1; Canada

Information
- Type: Elementary
- Religious affiliation: Catholic
- Opened: 1955
- School board: Greater Saskatoon Catholic Schools
- Principal: Nicole Isabelle
- Grades: Pre-Kindergarten to Grade 8
- Enrollment: 167 (2017)
- Education system: Separate
- Language: English
- Team name: Sabres
- Feeder to: E. D. Feehan High School
- Website: St. John School

- Saskatoon French School / l'École Française de Saskatoon - elementary, associate school with Greater Saskatoon Catholic Schools
- St. John Community School - separate (Catholic) elementary, part of Greater Saskatoon Catholic Schools

== Area Parks ==
- Boughton Park 6.07 acres (24,600 m^{2})
- Holiday Park 8.62 acres (34,900 m^{2})
- Victoria Park 4.98 acres (20,200 m^{2})

== Transportation ==
=== City Transit ===
Holiday Park is serviced by Saskatoon Transit bus route #9.

== Layout ==
The northern boundary extends no further than 11th Street, and the southern edge overlooks the scenic vista of the Holiday Park Golf Course. Avenue P South through to the South Saskatchewan River are the western and eastern boundaries respectively. The roads are laid out in a grid fashion, the streets south of 11th Street are named: Dudley, Schuyler, and Wellington Streets, followed by Embassy Drive. The avenues are labelled alphabetically with the alphabet. Spadina Crescent cruises along the South Saskatchewan River and incrementing westward through the alphabet. A key three-way intersection at 11th Street, Avenue H and Spadina Crescent was closed for several years in the mid-2010s to allow for expansion of a water treatment plant, forcing southbound motorists to cut-through Holiday Park in order to access and egress Spadina Crescent. In 2016 the intersection was reopened, but was permanently closed in March 2019.

Spadina Crescent was for many years the primary access road to the city's main landfill and the Queen Elizabeth II Power Station. With Spadina Crescent closed, landfill traffic and power plant traffic is now rerouted via a new entrance to the dump off Valley Road to the southwest of Holiday Park.
