= Saskatoon Sanatorium =

- Saskatchewan Anti-Tuberculosis League (The Lung Association of Saskatchewan)

Geography
- Location: 1350 Avenue K South, Saskatoon, Saskatchewan, Canada
- Coordinates: 52°6′30″N 106°41′12″W

Organization
- Care system: Public
- Type: Sanatorium

Services
- Beds: 175

History
- Founded: April 15, 1925
- Closed: 1988

Links
- Lists: Hospitals in Canada

The Saskatoon Sanatorium was a tuberculosis sanatorium established in 1925 by the Saskatchewan Anti-Tuberculosis League as the second Sanatorium in the province in Wellington Park south or the Holiday Park neighborhood of Saskatoon, Saskatchewan, Canada. In 1929 Saskatchewan became the first jurisdiction to implement universal free diagnosis and treatment of tuberculosis, leading to better control of the disease by the three sanatoriums in the Province (Fort San, Prince Albert Sanatorium and the Saskatoon Sanatorium).

With the development of antibiotics and vaccines for tuberculosis, the need for a sanatorium diminished. The last patient was discharged in 1988 and the sanatorium was closed. The Saskatchewan Anti-Tuberculosis League evolved into The Lung Association of Saskatchewan and focused on other respiratory conditions and prevention programs.

The building had deteriorated to the point where it was not cost-effective to retain it as a medical facility. This led the province to engage in a public consultation to determine if other uses for the building could be found. The building was demolished in August 1989. The grass bowl area in front of the building still remains as park land. The Bowerman House, used as the residence for the sanatorium superintendent, remains and was declared a municipal heritage property.
