= Delta Bessborough =

Hotel in Saskatoon, Saskatchewan, Canada

Delta Hotels Bessborough
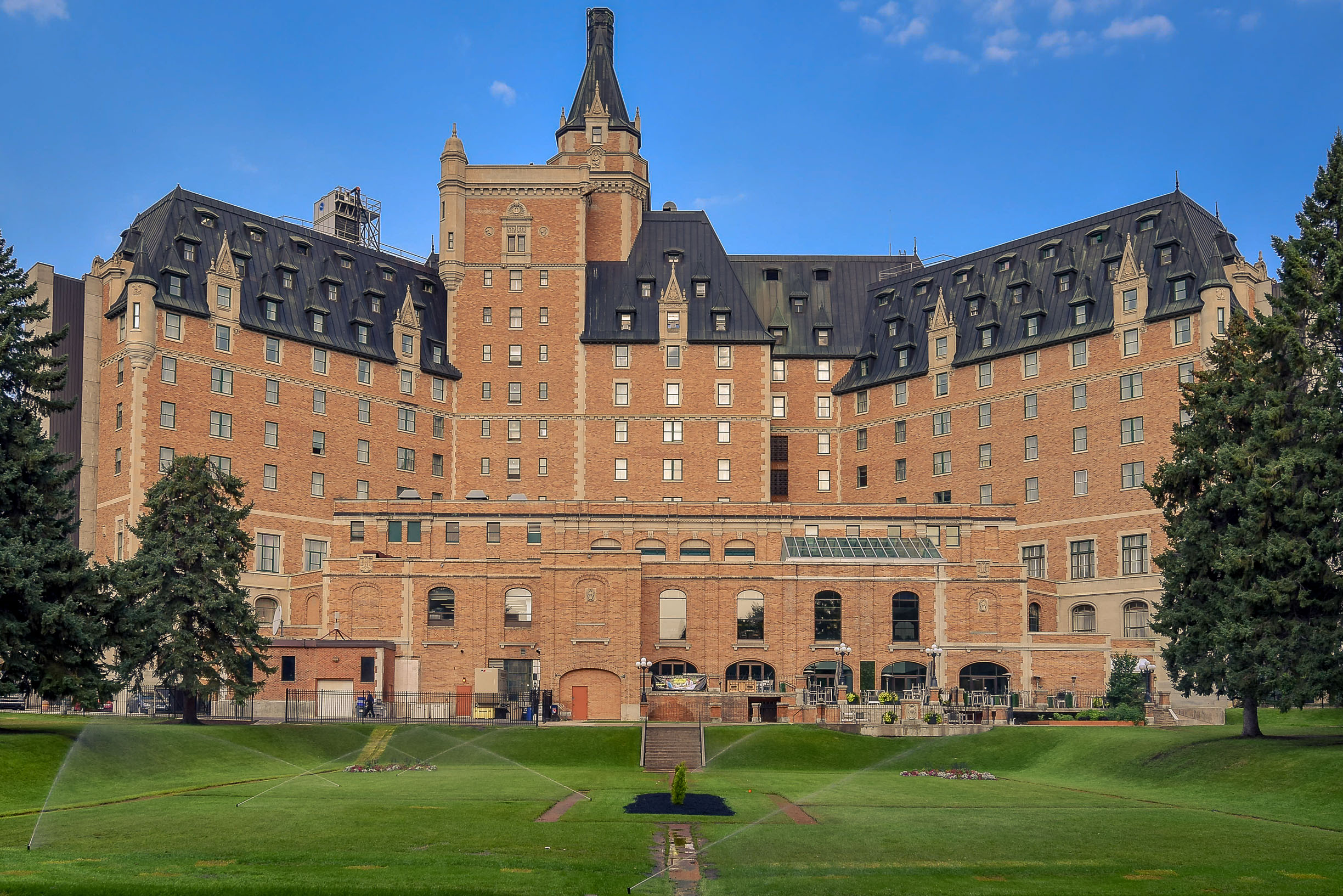
- The Delta Bessborough eastern façade
- Interactive map of the Delta Hotels Bessborough area
- Former names: The Bessborough

Record height
- Tallest in Saskatoon from 1932 to 1966^{[I]}
- Preceded by: Canada Building
- Surpassed by: Marquis Tower

General information
- Architectural style: Châteauesque
- Location: 601 Spadina Crescent East; Saskatoon, Saskatchewan
- Coordinates: 52°07′35″N 106°39′33″W
- Named for: 9th Earl of Bessborough
- Groundbreaking: 1930
- Opened: 10 December 1935
- Owner: Leadon Investment Inc.
- Management: Delta Hotels

Height
- Height: 58.5 metres (192 ft)

Technical details
- Floor count: 10

Design and construction
- Architect: Archibald and Schofield
- Developer: Canadian National Railway

Other information
- Number of rooms: 225
- Number of restaurants: 3

Website
- Delta Bessborough

The Delta Hotels Bessborough, formerly and commonly known as the Bessborough (/ˈbɛsbəroʊ/), is a historic hotel in Saskatoon, Saskatchewan, Canada. The hotel is within the Central Business District, a commercial district in Saskatoon. The Bessborough was designed by Archibald and Schofield for Canadian National Hotels, a division of Canadian National Railway.

Opened in 1935, the Châteauesque-styled building is 58.5-metre-tall (192 ft), containing 10 floors. The building is considered one of Canada's grand railway hotels. After its completion, the building was the tallest building in Saskatoon, until the nearby Marquis Tower was completed in 1966. The hotel is owned by Leadon Investment Inc., although it is managed by Delta Hotels, a hotel chain brand of Marriott International.

== Location ==
The Delta Bessborough is located at 601 Spadina Crescent East at the southeastern end of the Central Business District, the commercial centre of Saskatoon. The hotel property is bounded by a roadway, and a natural waterway, and parkland. To the east of the hotel lies the South Saskatchewan River, a major waterway that runs through the city. The property is bounded to the north and south by Kiwanis Park, with the property bisecting the park into two areas. To the west, the hotel is bounded by Spadina Crescent East. The hotel is the eastern terminating vista for 21st Street East, and the view terminus on Spadina Crescent from points south of the hotel.

The hotel is situated near a number of attractions located within the Central Business District. Southwest of the hotel lies a performing arts centre, the Remai Arts Centre, and an art gallery, Remai Modern. Situated northwest of the hotel is Midtown Plaza shopping centre, and a convention centre, TCU Place. Broadway Bridge, an arch bridge over the South Saskatchewan River, is located south of the hotel. Saskatoon station, a former railway station and a National Historic Site of Canada is located on the northwest of the hotel, just outside the Central Business District.

== Design ==
=== Architecture ===
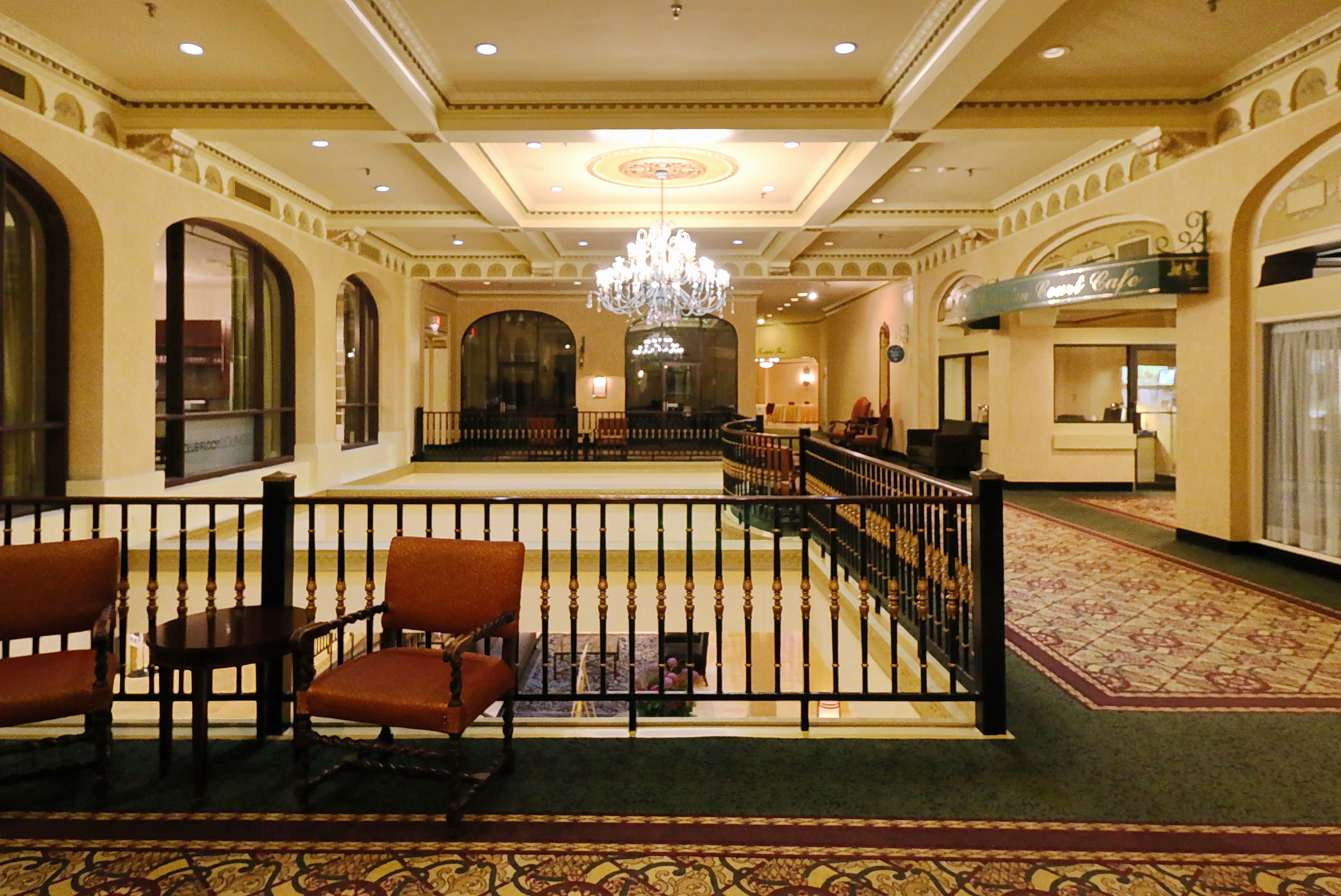
The interior of the hotel features ceiling moulds, and plaster reliefs.

The Delta Bessborough is one of Canada's grand railway hotels built for Canadian National Railway. The hotel was initially designed by John S. Archibald, although John Schofield would take over after Archibald's death. The building was designed in a Châteauesque-style, with further inspiration drawn from castles in Bavaria. The heavy use of the Châteauesque architectural style on a number of early grand railway hotels in the country eventually led to its recognition as a distinct Canadian architectural style by the 1920s. In an effort to capitalize on this sentiment, the designs for the hotel were made to emphasize its Châteauesque features, through the increased use of medieval elements.

Châteauesque features found on the hotel include oriel windows, rounded turrets, quoins, string courses, and machicolations on the hotel's walls. The roof of the hotel features Gothic Revival dormers with carved tympana are spread throughout. A variety of different grotesque are also spread throughout the building. Materials used in construction were of Canadian origin, including Tyndall stone from Manitoba, brick from the Claybank Brick Plant in Claybank, Saskatchewan, and tiles from Estevan, Saskatchewan. The interior of the hotel features ceiling moulds, plaster reliefs, and terrazzo floors.

=== Facilities ===
The hotel includes 225 guest rooms and suites. Suites at the hotel includes the Vice Regal Suite, a suite located on the third floor of the hotel, facing towards the Central Business District.

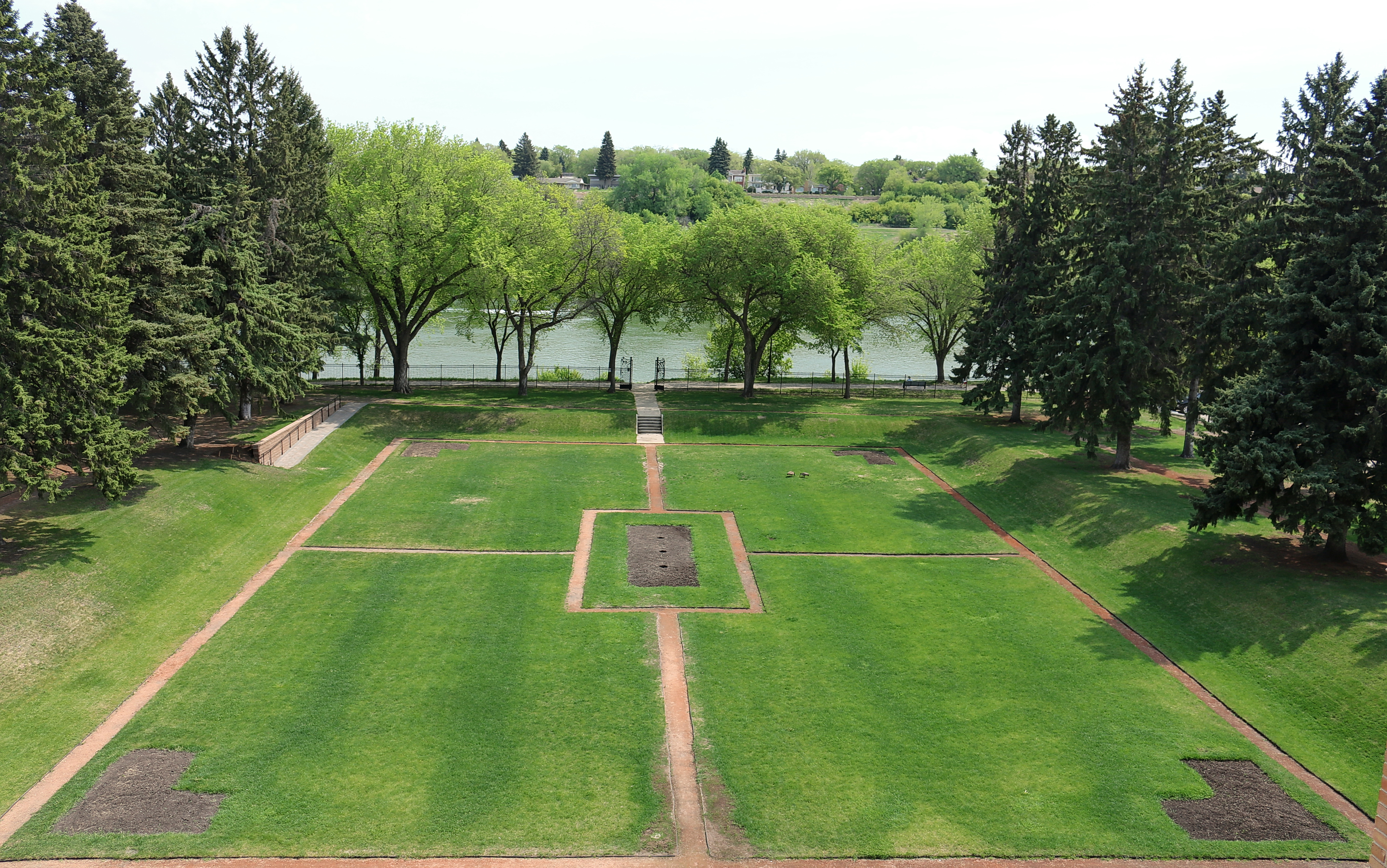
The hotel includes a waterfront garden backing into the South Saskatchewan River

Several areas in the hotel are occupied by three restaurants and other food-based services. Restaurants located within the Bessborough Hotel include the Garden Court Cafe, a restaurant featuring locally sourced food. In addition to food-services and lodgings, the hotel also includes a fitness centre, pool, and a 167 square metres (1,800 sq ft) spa. The hotel also features 1,672 square metres (17,995 sq ft) of event space, used for conferences, weddings, and other social events.

The hotel property also features a 20,000 square metres (4.9 acres) of private waterfront gardens backing into the South Saskatchewan River. The gardens hosts large functions and are commonly used a number of social events, most notably the Saskatchewan Jazz Festival.

== History ==
After the Canadian Pacific Railway built a railway hotel in Regina in 1926, the Saskatoon business community lobbied Canadian National Railway to build one in Saskatoon. On December 31, 1928, Sir Henry Thornton, President of the Canadian National Railway, announced that it would build a similar hotel in Saskatoon. In February 1930, the excavation of the site began using a steam thawer and gasoline excavator. In exchange for building a "chateau" style hotel with a minimum of 200 rooms, the city exempted the railway from property tax on the hotel for 25 years.

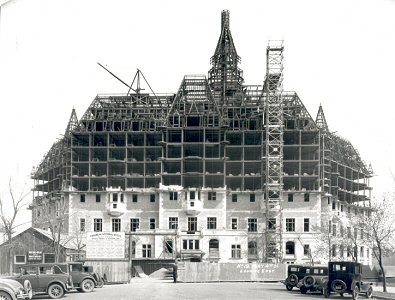
The hotel under construction in 1931.

On May 30, 1931, Walter Pratt, General Manager of Hotels, Sleeping and Dining Cars of the Canadian National Railway, announced that His Excellency The 9th Earl of Bessborough, 14th Governor General of Canada, had given his consent for the hotel to be formally named "The Bessborough." The Earl and the Countess visited the hotel under construction in 1932. Construction was completed in 1932 but the difficult financial times of the Great Depression prevented the hotel from opening until Horace N. Stovin became the first official registered guest, on December 10, 1935.

In 1972, Donald, Dick, and Marc Baltzan purchased the Bessborough. The Baltzans sold the Bessborough to Delta Hotels in 1989 and it was renamed Delta Bessborough. The hotel was acquired by the Legacy Hotels Real Estate Investment Trust in 1998, and in 1999, a $9,000,000 restoration was completed to return many of its historical features. The hotel underwent a major renovation in 2003.

The hotel remains under the Delta Hotels management banner, which was acquired by Marriott International in 2015.
