= Central Business District, Saskatoon =

Downtown Saskatoon, Saskatchewan, Canada

Central Business District
- Neighbourhood
- Downtown Saskatoon Business Improvement District
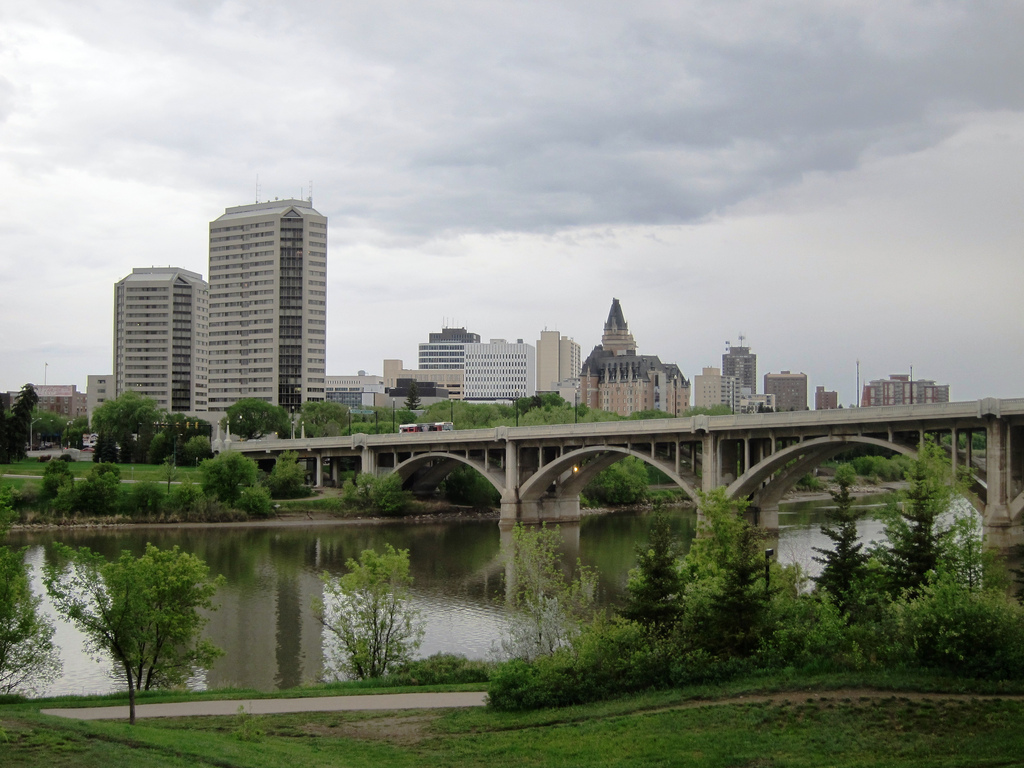
- Skyline of Saskatoon's Central Business District
- Nickname: Downtown Saskatoon
- Interactive map of Central Business District
- Coordinates: 52°7′49″N 106°39′44″W
- Country: Canada
- Province: Saskatchewan
- City: Saskatoon
- Sector: Core Neighbourhoods Sector
- Founded: 1890
- Incorporation Village: 1901

Government
  - Type: Mayor-Council (Ward 6)
  - Administrative body: Saskatoon City Council
  - Councillor: Cynthia Block

Area
  - Total: 1.17 km^{2} (0.45 sq mi)

Population (2022)
  - Total: 3,258
  - Density: 2,780/km^{2} (7,210/sq mi)
  - Average Income: $35,420
- Time zone: UTC−6 (CST)
- Area code: Area code 306

The Central Business District is one of seven development districts in Saskatoon, Saskatchewan, Canada. The central business district is Ward 6 of a Mayor-Council government represented by councillor Cynthia Block. Formerly called West Saskatoon, this area arose when the steam engines built their pumping stations on the lower west bank of the South Saskatchewan River. Retail enterprises sprang up around the newly created train station and rail yards. The city of Saskatoon's Central Business District has shopping malls and boutiques.

== History ==
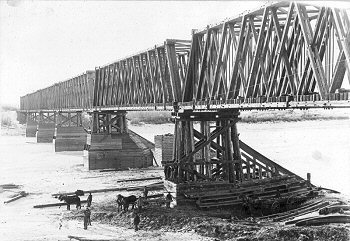
Erected in 1890, the QLLSR Bridge provided access between the two sides of the South Saskatchewan River.

In 1890 the Qu'Appelle, Long Lake and Saskatchewan Railway Line (QLLR) or The Qu'Appelle, Long Lake and Saskatchewan Steamboat and Railway Line (QLLSR) extended from Regina through to Prince Albert, crossing the South Saskatchewan River where the Senator Sid Buckwold Bridge crosses the river presently. Steam engines could be refilled easier on the west banks of the river which were not so steep. Businesses sprang up around the pumping station forming the beginnings of the Central Business District. The first post offices were named Saskatoon and West Saskatoon. For clarification, the post offices adopted the titles Saskatoon down town and Nutana (meaning "first born") for the east side of the River settlement. Section 28, Twp.36, R.5, W3 was the location of West Saskatoon Post office located at 21st & 1st Ave.

With settlement on the west side of the river, 32 children needed to cross the river to attend the Stone School on the east side where there were 67 students in total. To cross the river, there was only the wooden rail bridge without walkway or by ferry. Another school – Pioneer School – was envisioned in 1900 at Third Avenue around 19th Street.

This area became a village of 100 citizens on November 16, 1901, named Saskatoon, and July 1, 1903, became a town. 1912, City Hall had official headquarters in the old King Edward School; 23rd St and 3rd Avenue. 1928 saw Eaton's opening in the building on 21 Street and Third Avenue, which later housed the Army and Navy Department Store and now the Saskatoon Board of Education offices. The armouries of the 29th Saskatchewan Light Horse Regimental Headquarters and 105th Fusiliers Division were constructed in south downtown in 1922. The Saskatoon Arena was constructed in 1937 on 19th Street and torn down in 1989.

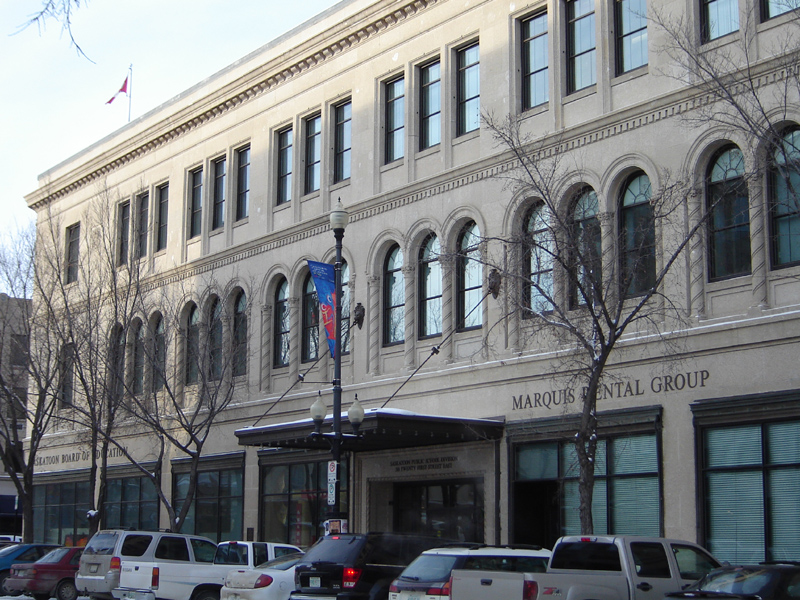
In 1928, Eaton's opened a store in the Central Business District, on 21 Street and Third Avenue.

The Central Business District is one of Saskatoon's seven suburban development districts. The Saskatoon downtown revitalization project began in the 1950s and 1960s when the Canadian National Railway yards were removed and replaced with a shopping mall in its image called the Midtown Plaza, and its neighbour the Saskatoon Centennial Auditorium and Convention Centre (recently renamed TCU Place). Eaton's and Simpson's Sears were the first anchors for the Midtown Plaza.

The present day City Hall had its opening ceremonies on June 23, 1956 October 5, 1965 was the last day the Canadian National Railway (CNR) passenger train ran through downtown Saskatoon over the old CNR bridge; it was replaced by the Idylwyld Bridge Senator Sid Buckwold Bridge on October 28, 1966. April 1, 1968 saw the official opening ceremonies of the Centennial Auditorium, and a short while later the first businesses in Midtown Plaza opened (the complete mall opened officially on July 30, 1970; it was enlarged in the 1990s. The Hudson's Bay Company building on 23rd Street East and 2nd Avenue has been converted to condominium living, and the adjacent Bayside Centre is now owned by Ashley Furniture. The Hudson's Bay Company and Sears Canada are the current anchors in the Midtown Plaza shopping mall, The Bay having replaced the now-defunct Eaton's. A longtime downtown landmark, the "Skywalk" that used to connect the 23rd Street/2nd Avenue Bay store with a neighbouring parkade was demolished in the late 2000s (along with the parkade).

- Book written about Down Town Saskatoon: City of Saskatoon Core Neighbourhood Study Review, 1980: vol. 3: Land use Policies and Land Use Patterns.

== Demographics ==
Condominiums are located in the downtown core area which house mostly seniors, University of Saskatchewan students and employees of the downtown business sector.

The average family income in the central business district is $35,420 amongst households which average 1.4 persons. Homeownership in this area is 24.5%. The 2nd Avenue Lofts is an example of one building originally intended for commercial operations that has in recent time been converted to residential. The population of downtown was approximately 3258 people as of 2022.

== Economy ==
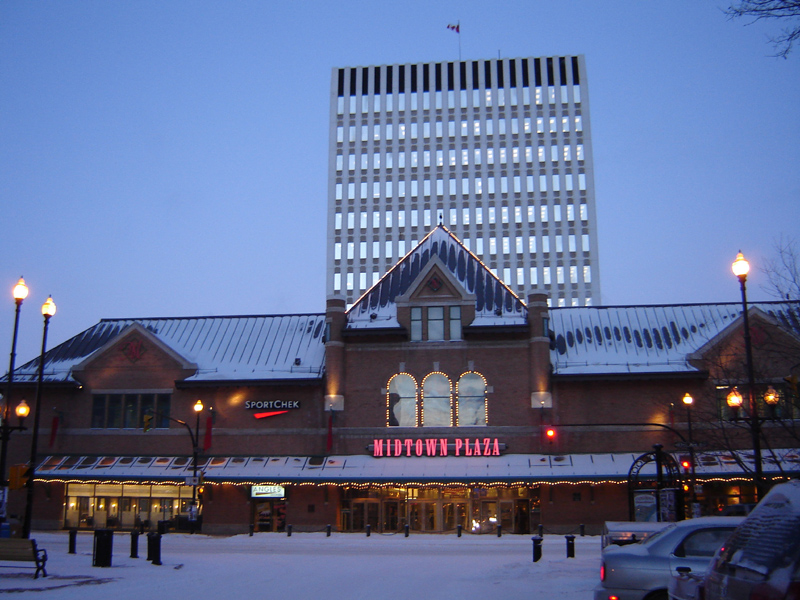
Midtown Plaza is a shopping mall located in the Central Business District.

There is 2,300,000 square feet (210,000 m^{2}) of retail and restaurants in 7,000,000 square feet (650,000 m^{2}) of building development in the 2.3 acres (9,300 m^{2}) allotted to the downtown core.

Second Avenue was revamped to provide angle parking and created a unique strip mall type of shopping area in the revitalised downtown core. The ceremonies of July 30, 1970 celebrated the opening of Saskatoon's enclosed downtown shopping mall named Midtown Plaza and developed on the former CNR yards.

The Scotia Centre Mall houses office of the Potash Corporation of Saskatchewan and boutiques and restaurant.

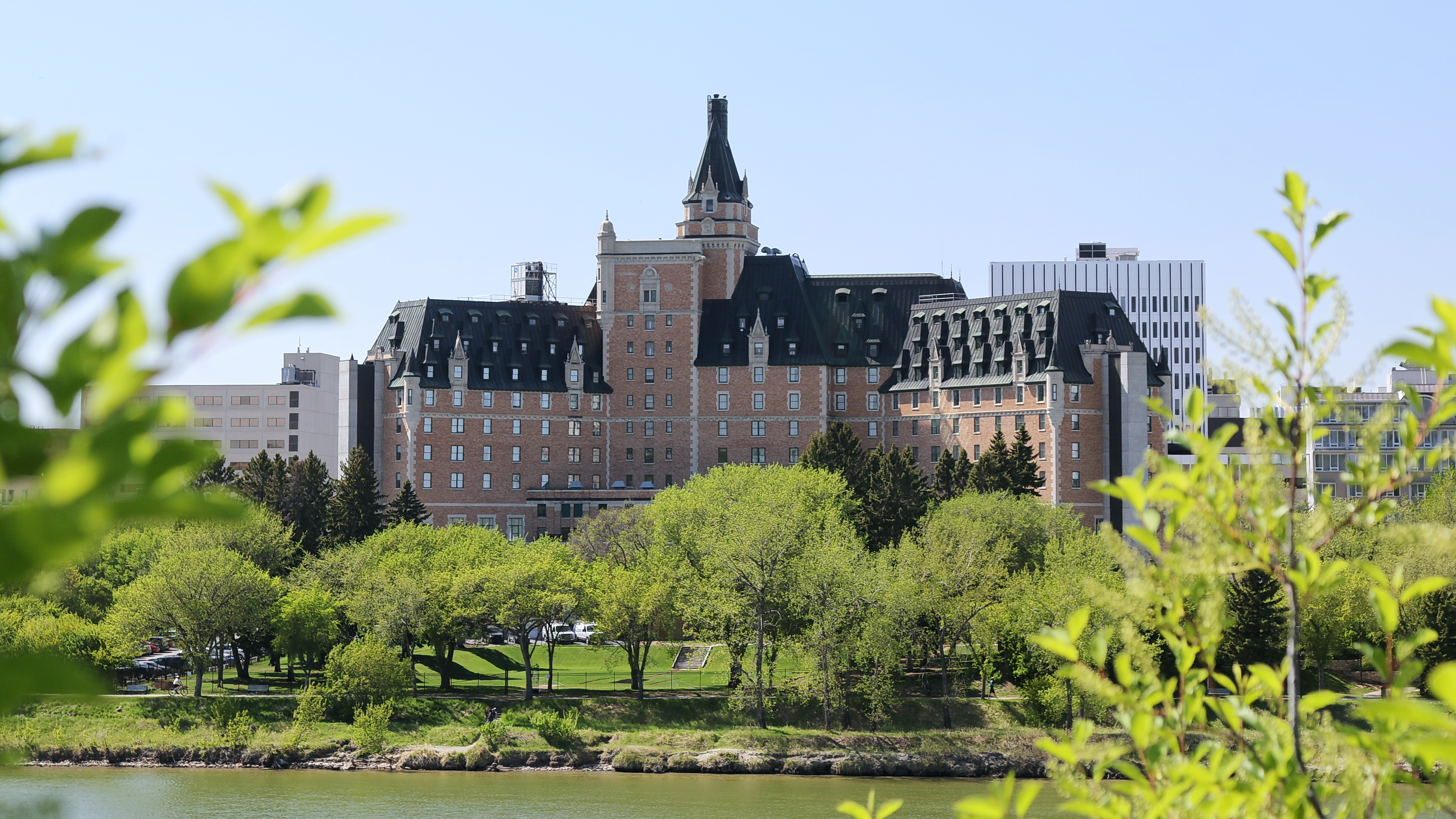
The Delta Bessborough is a hotel, and major landmark in downtown.

== Education ==
Currently the downtown core hosts private vocational schools, career colleges and trade schools such as CDI College, Academy of Learning, Marca College, Marvel Schools – Saskatoon School of Esthetics and Hairstyling, McKay Career Training, Regency College, Saskatoon Business College and Universal Career College.

- Pioneer School, an early stone elementary one room schoolhouse, was ready for use in 1900. This frame building was moved to the King Edward School site c.1912 to provide more classrooms to the replacement brick building.
- King Edward School opened July 1904. The frame Pioneer school closed at its location, but was soon moved to supplement classes at King Edward School. It was not long before another King Edward school was rebuilt to serve the educational needs of the public school children still residing in this area. It was located in City Park now Kinsmen Park a part of the City Park subdivision. The second King Edward School was on 25th Street until it was demolished in 1980
- The Gathercole Building started out as the Technical Collegiate Institute in 1931. In 1968, the Technical Collegiate Institute housed the administration offices and Riverview Collegiate. In 1972 it was called the Dr. F. J. Gathercole Education Centre. This building has recently been torn down and the area is part of the South Downtown – River Landing Project.
- The T. Eaton Store which later became the Army & Navy Department Store is now the location of the Saskatoon Public School Board.

== Governance ==
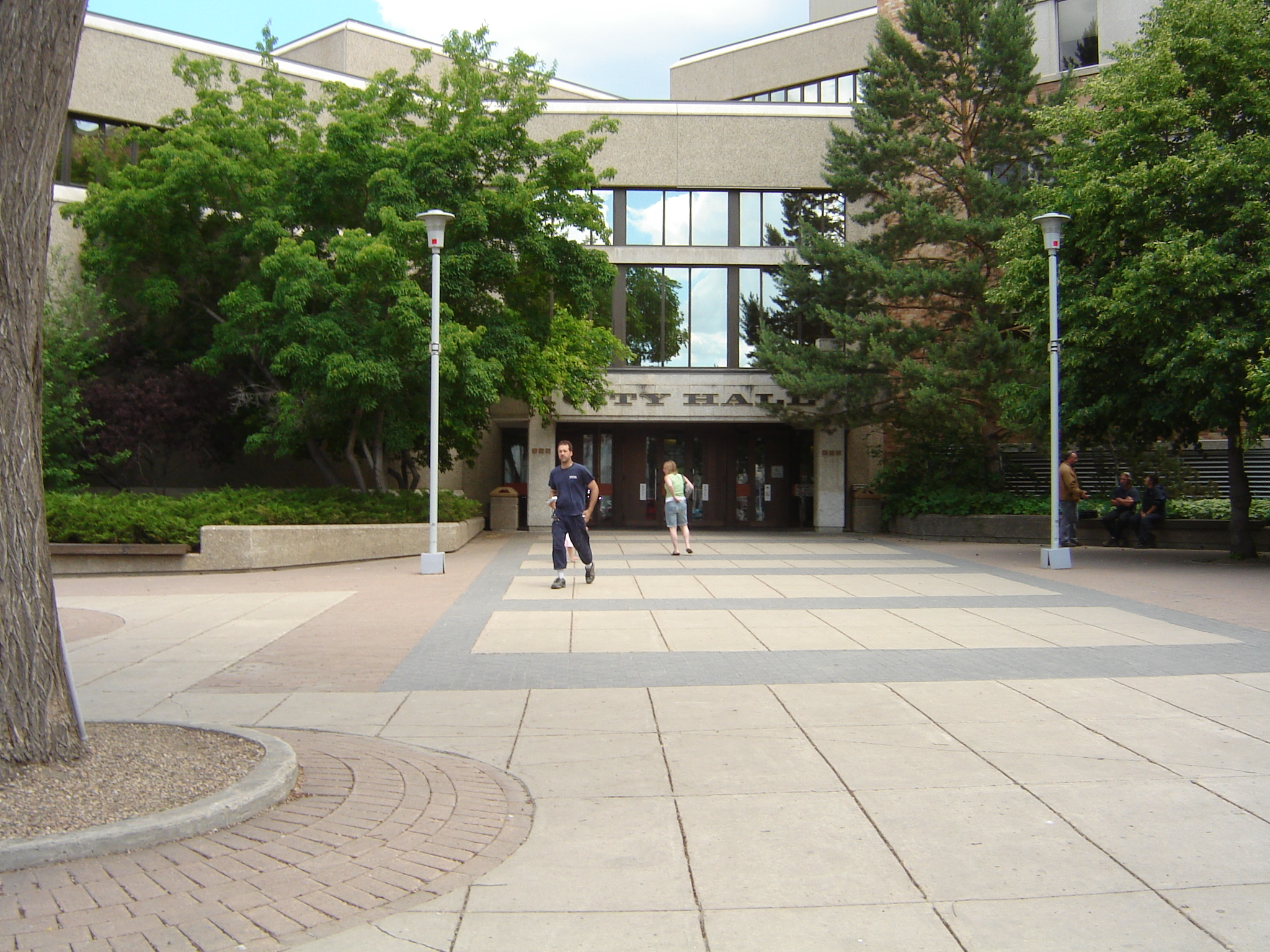
Saskatoon City Hall, the seat of local government, is located in the city's Central Business District.

The village of Saskatoon, often referred to as West Saskatoon was incorporated in 1901. When Saskatoon, Riversdale and Nutana amalgamated to form the city of Saskatoon in 1903, James R. Wilson (Russell Wilson) was the first mayor. In 1912, the King Edward School building housed the City of Saskatoon City Hall Chambers in the heart of the Central Business District at Third Avenue and 23rd Street. The first King Edward School building was used as City Hall until 1956, when it was demolished and replaced with modern civic buildings. The municipal government holds weekly meetings Monday evenings at City Hall located at 222 3rd Avenue North located in the Central Business District.

Federally, Saskatoon and Saskatoon City were the electoral districts that represented the central business district in the House of Commons of Canada from 1908–1968. Currently the central business district lies within the Saskatoon West riding and has been represented by Brad Redekopp of the Conservative Party of Canada since 2019.

Provincially, the area is mostly within the boundaries of Saskatoon Centre. It is currently represented by David Forbes of the Saskatchewan New Democratic Party who was first elected in 2001. A small portion of the neighborhood north of 24th Street is within the boundaries of Saskatoon Meewasin.

In Saskatoon's non-partisan municipal politics, the Central Business District lies within ward 6. It is currently represented by Councillor Cynthia Block who was first elected in 2016.

=== Public services ===
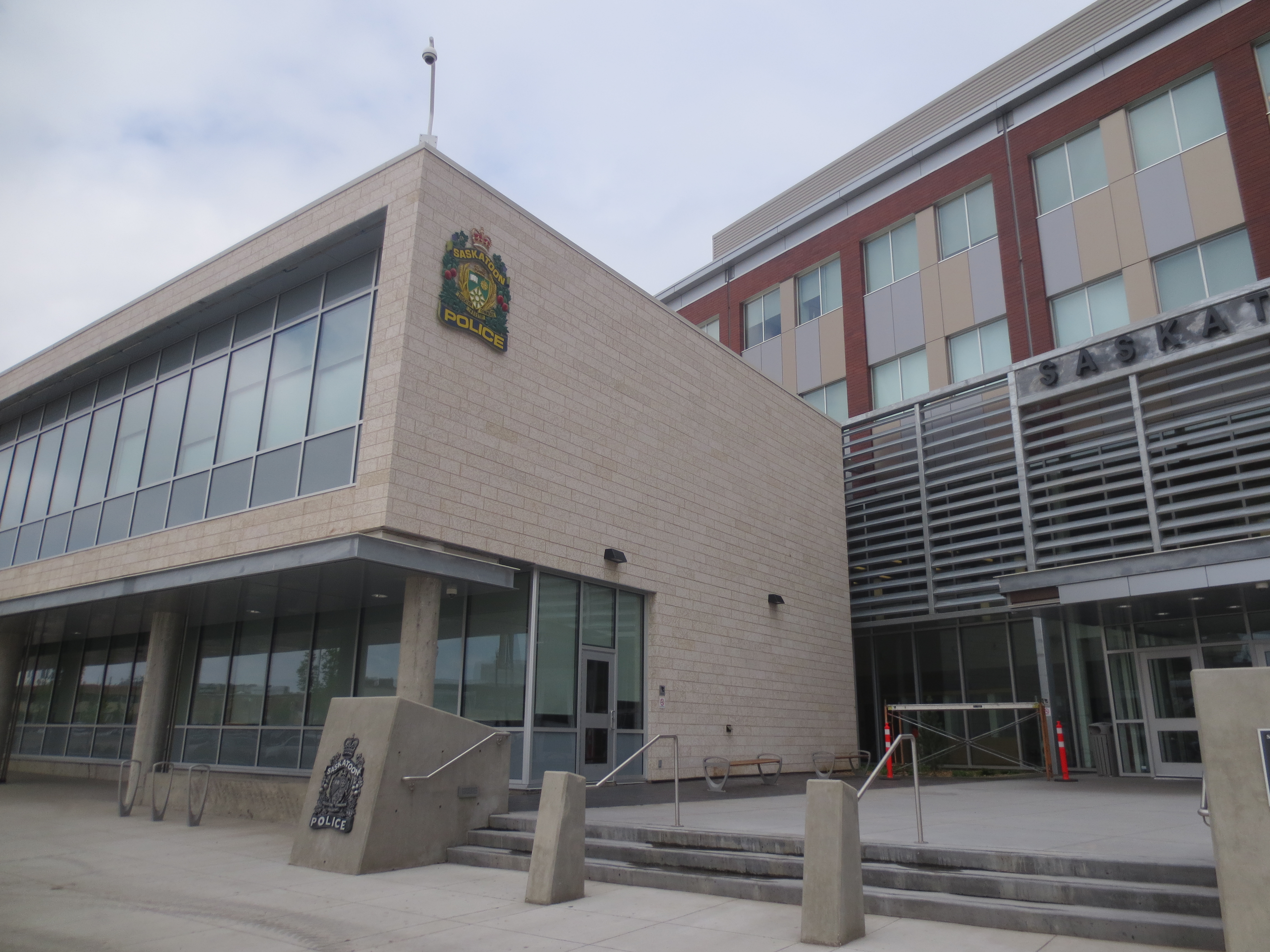
The headquarters of the Saskatoon Police Service, the municipal police service, is located in downtown.

Saskatoon Light & Power provides electrical utilities to all Saskatoon neighbourhoods which existed prior to 1958. Water is treated and supplied by the City of Saskatoon Water and Wastewater Treatment Branch. There are health professional offices in the central business district, such as physician, dentist, optometric services. The three Saskatoon hospitals are located in other nearby neighbourhoods. St. Paul's Hospital is located in Pleasant Hill, Royal University Hospital is located in the University of Saskatchewan Land Management area, and Saskatoon City Hospital is located in City Park. The Saskatoon Police Service Headquarters location is within the central business district located at 130 4th Avenue North. The Central Division oversees the Central Business District, the Riversdale Business District, SIAST and nine other residential areas. The central business district is served by the City of Saskatoon Saskatoon Fire & Protective Services, Fire Hall number 1 and head office is located at 125 Idylwyld Drive South, Riversdale.

== Recreation ==
=== Arena ===
The Saskatoon Arena, originally located on the south side of 19th Street between 1st and 2nd avenues, was the city's main venue for sports events from 1937 until its closure in the early 1980s, and was also used for concerts and other events. The Arena was home to the early Western Hockey League's Saskatoon Quakers (and later the Saskatoon Blades) hockey games, wrestling events, concerts, and the Shrine Circus. The Arena was replaced by Saskatchewan Place, now known as Credit Union Centre, on the city's outskirts, while the construction of Centennial Auditorium (now TCU Place) and improvements to the Exhibition Grounds led to these venues becoming preferred for concerts and other specialty events in the later years of the arena's history.

=== Galleries ===
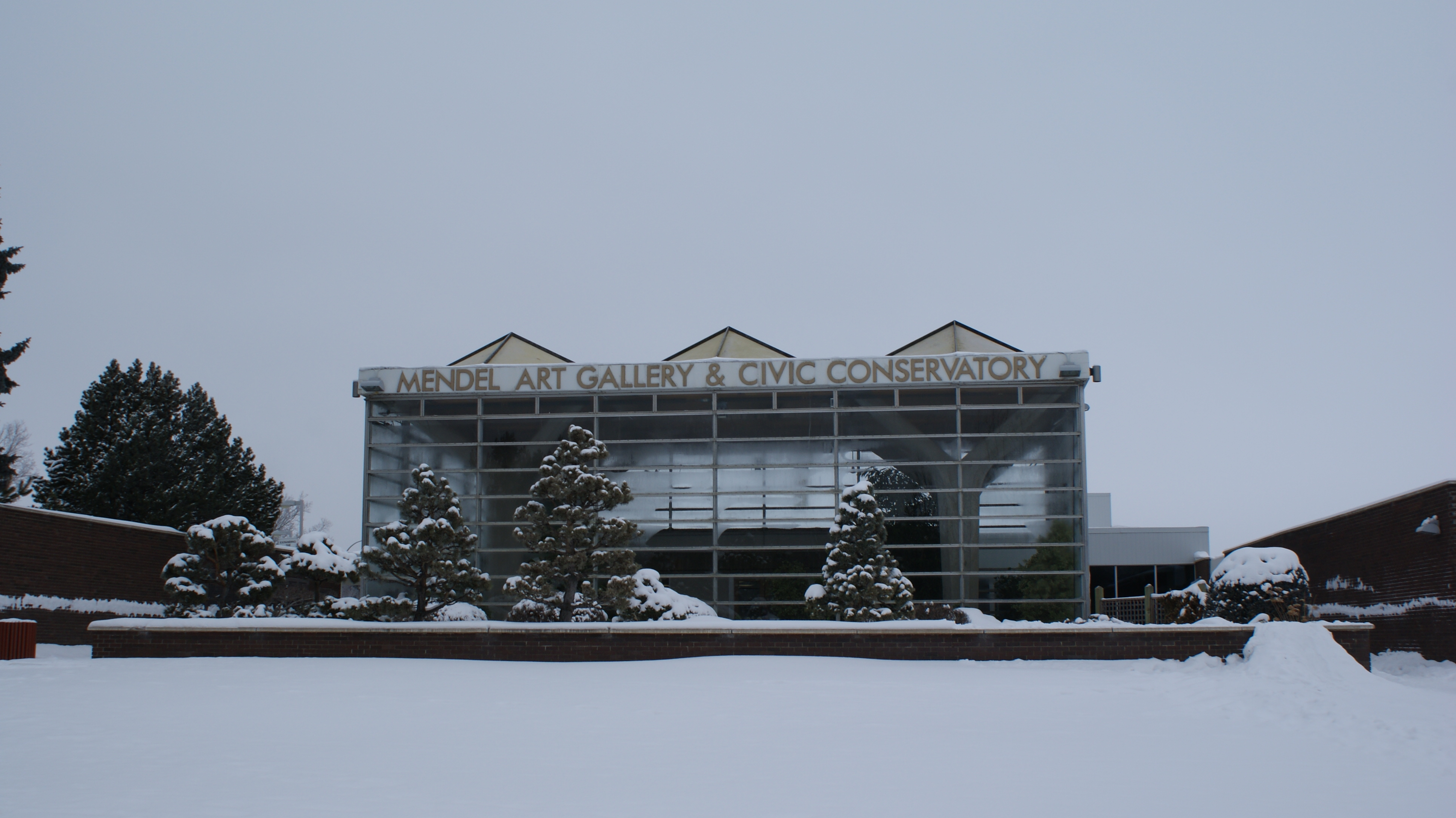
Opened in 1964, Mendel Art Gallery is a major cultural centre in downtown.

Opened in 1964, the Mendel Art Gallery is located on Spadina Crescent East and overlooks the South Saskatchewan River near the base of the University Bridge. Frederick (Fred) Salomon Mendel, Intercontinental Packers Limited entrepreneur began the gallery in appreciation of a new life began in Saskatoon. The gallery hosts a permanent locations, and galleries of rotating collections to celebrate the arts.

The Art Placement Gallery is a commercial enterprise on 3rd Avenue South

The Saskatoon Centennial Auditorium was opened April 1, 1968. In 2006 the centre underwent major renovation with funding from TCU Financial. The name TCU Place Arts & Convention Centre is sponsored for 10 years. TCU Place – Saskatoon's Arts and Convention Centre hosts ballets, symphonies, musicals, plays, concerts, and conventions in the heart of downtown.

=== Movies ===
The downtown area has been the home of different movie theatres over the years. Cineplex Odeon, recently closed down its Pacific Cinemas and now shows their movies at the new twelve-screen theatre complex called Galaxy Theatre. Famous Players Capitol 4 is on First Avenue, and became Empire Capitol 4 in 2005. The old Capitol Theatre (1929–1979) was located on Second Avenue, and was a single movie screen theatre and was demolished (amid public outcry) to make way for the Scotia Centre Mall in 1979. The Roxy Theatre, for time called the Towne Cinema, is located nearby in the Riversdale neighbourhood. Daylight Theatre (1935–1965), Midtown Cinemas (1970–2000), and Paramount Theatre (1969–1980) are previous movie theaters that no longer exist downtown. The Odeon Theatre was renovated into the Odeon Events Centre. The aforementioned Galaxy is at present the only movie theatre still operating in the Central Business District.

=== Parks ===
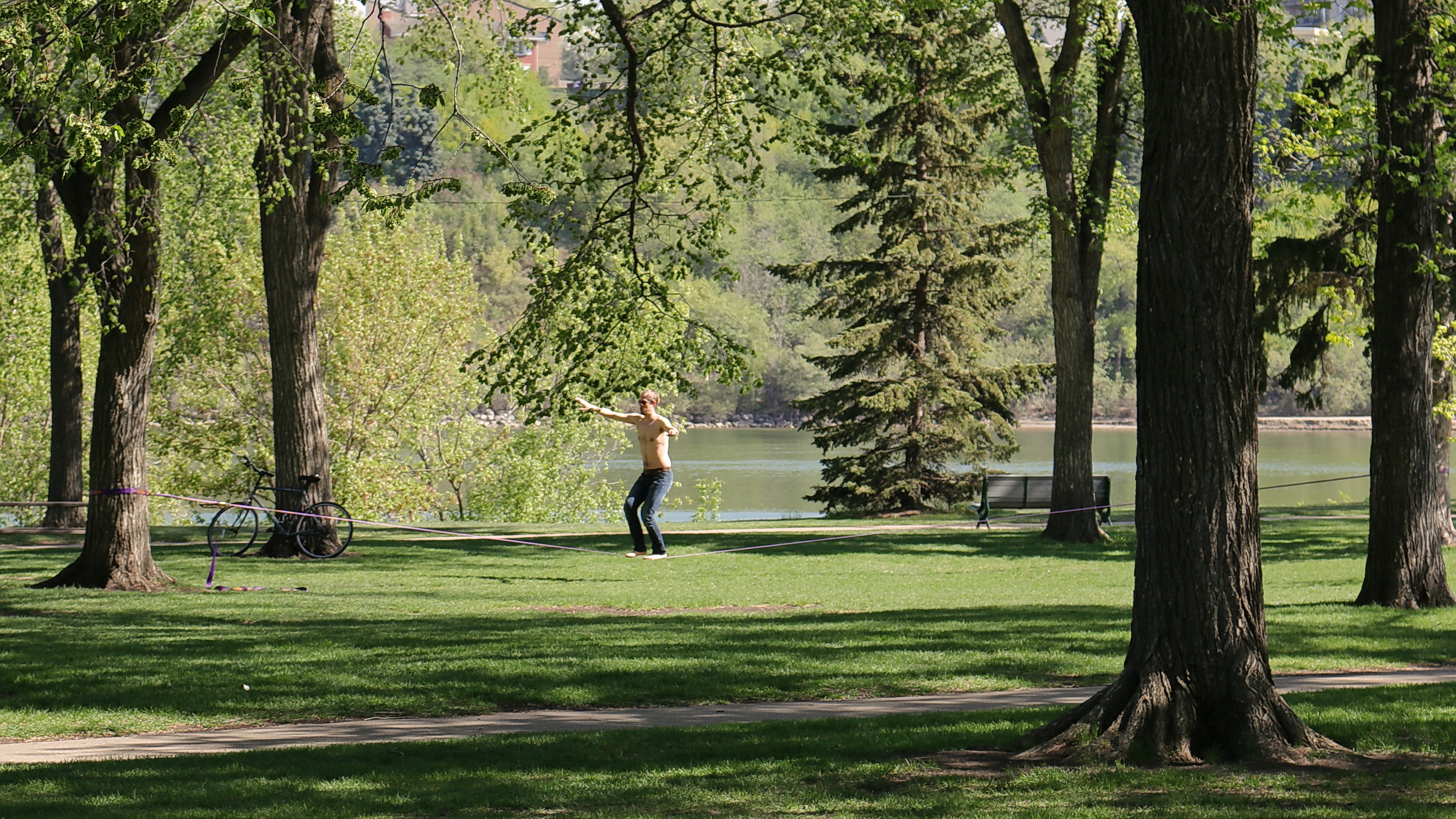
Kiwanis Memorial Park is an urban park along the riverfront in downtown.

- Friendship Park
- Saskatoon Kinsmen Park
- Kiwanis Memorial Park
- The Meewasin Valley Authority has been developing park land and walkways on both sides of the river.

Within this park various Saskatoon festivals and events are hosted, such as the Saskatoon Children's Festival, the Saskatoon Jazz Festival, public ice skating rink, Taste of Saskatchewan, and Shakespeare on the Saskatchewan. A previous event was "Louis Riel Day", with the Riel Relay, a team competitive event comprising running, canoeing, horseback riding being the highlights.

== Transportation ==
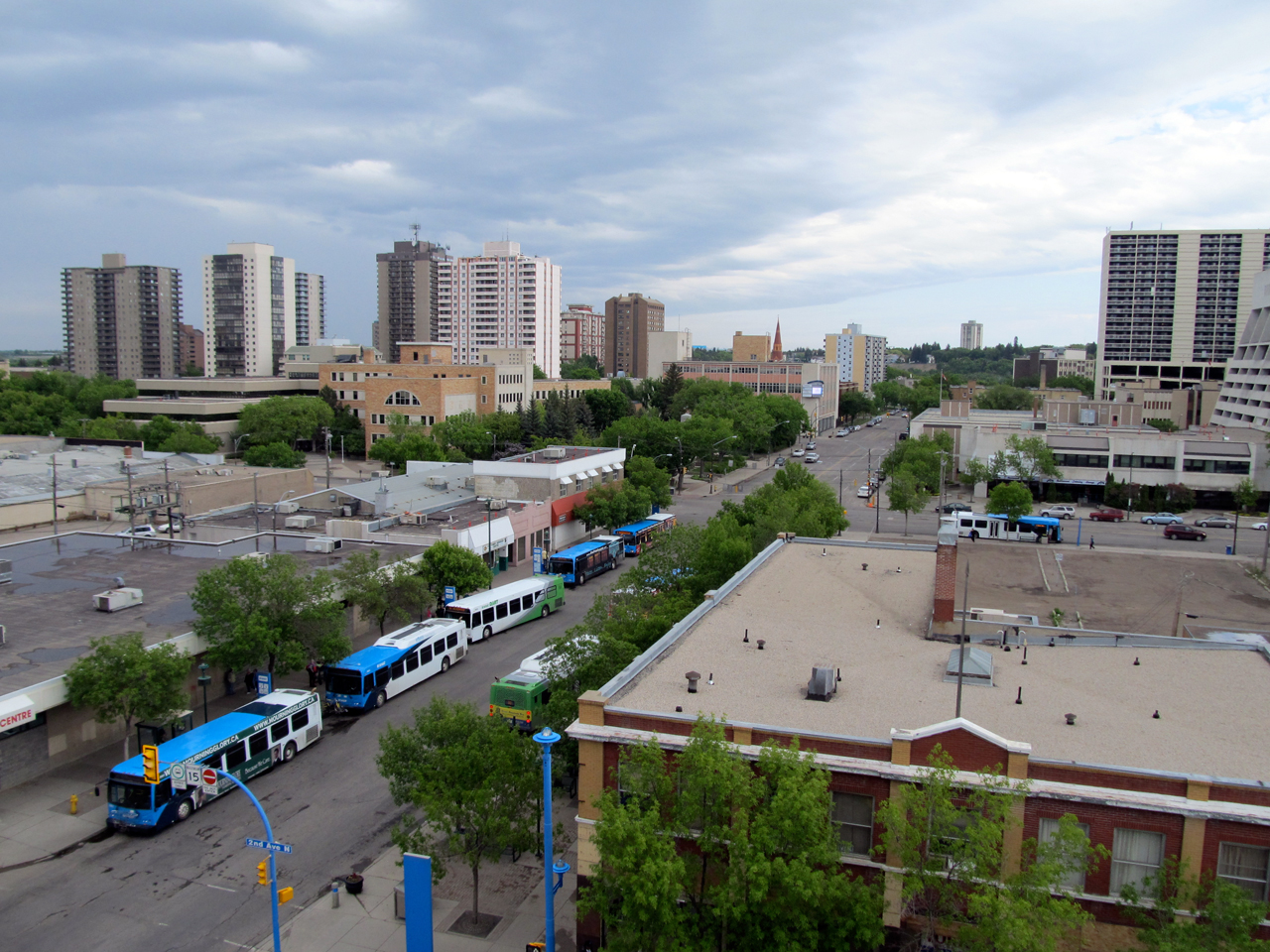
Parts of 23rd Street have been closed off in the Central Business District, transforming that section into a transit hub for Saskatoon Transit.

=== Municipal transit ===
Saskatoon Municipal Railway or Saskatoon Municipal Street Railway provided an electric railway in Saskatoon and the surrounding area, for instance connecting Saskatoon and the village of Sutherland. The Electric Railway operated between 1912 and 1951. Saskatoon Transit operated from 1949 to present. The early trolley cars operated from electric lines suspended above the streets, and the trolley cars ran on tracks. This system was employed between 1948–1974. The wires were in need of repair from ice accumulation in the winter months, and were subject to breakage. Motor buses supplemented this system starting in the late 1930s and are still in operation today.

The 23rd Street roadway between 2nd Avenue and 3rd Avenue has been closed off to produce a hub city bus terminal. This produces access to anywhere in the city via a type of spoked wheel analogy. If you catch a city route bus on any of the spokes of the wheel or any neighborhood, they all pass through the hub, so a bus transfer will connect you to all sections and neighbourhoods of the city of Saskatoon. The transit system has added recent innovations such as the Bio Bus, Access Transit, and Low Floor Service.

=== Regional transit ===
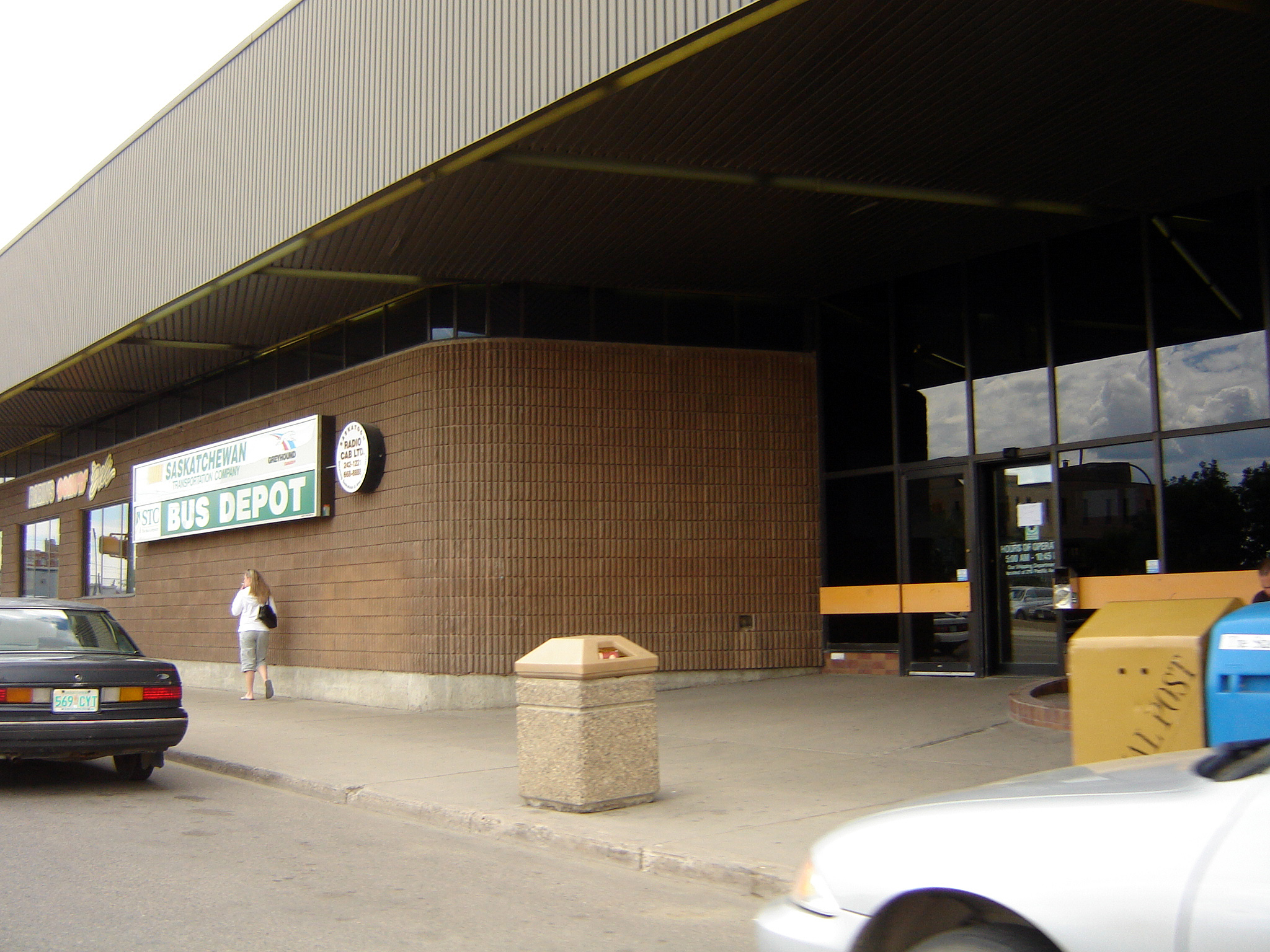
Bus depot for the former Saskatchewan Transportation Company in downtown

Saskatchewan Transportation Company operated a major bus depot in downtown Saskatoon on 23rd Street and Pacific Avenue or the Warehouse district. It provided passenger and parcel services across Saskatchewan from 1946 to 2017.

=== Street ===
22nd Street (Highway 14) is a major thoroughfare through Saskatoon. Highway 14 connects with Asquith, Biggar Wilkie, Unity, and Macklin en route to Alberta.

Idylwyld Drive was formerly known as Avenue A, (Highway 11). It is a main thoroughfare through the city connecting Regina, Saskatoon, and Prince Albert. It also connects west Saskatoon with the bedroom communities of Warman and Martensville.

Vehicular access from east Saskatoon across the South Saskatchewan River is provided by three bridges – the Buckwold (or Freeway) Bridge, the Broadway Bridge and the University or 25th Street Bridge (all three bridges also provide pedestrian crossings). A fourth bridge, the Traffic or Victoria Bridge, provided access from Nutana into downtown for more than a century until it was declared unsafe for vehicular traffic in the late 2000s and closed; as of 2012 the historic structure was in the process of being dismantled with plans for a future replacement bridge still the subject of debate.

== Urban planning ==
The early layout consisted of a train bridge where the CNR Bridge (present day site of the Senator Sid Buckwold Bridge or Freeway/Idywyld Bridge) Senator Sid Buckwold Bridge currently stands. The train yards, switching station, station house were all at the foot of the bridge. Warehouses sprang up along the rail tracks. Homes, and schools were scattered to the east of the train yards. Churches lined the river bank edge; Spadina Crescent was first named Church Road. The western side of the rail yard became the town of Riversdale, and were smaller sized lots. The eastern side was the town of West Saskatoon.

When the revitalisation downtown project commenced in the 1960s, the rail yards were refashioned into the current downtown core, a shopping mall, and two large at-grade parking lots (for the shopping mall). The rail bridge was demolished and an automotive bridge was constructed in its place. The layout started on Avenue A (now Idylwyld Avenue) and the riverbank for the QLLS. Streets are laid out east-west, and avenues north-south. First Avenue begins to the east of Avenue A and numbers rise consecutively towards Spadina Crescent. Streets are numerical incrementing northward.

=== South Downtown River Landing ===
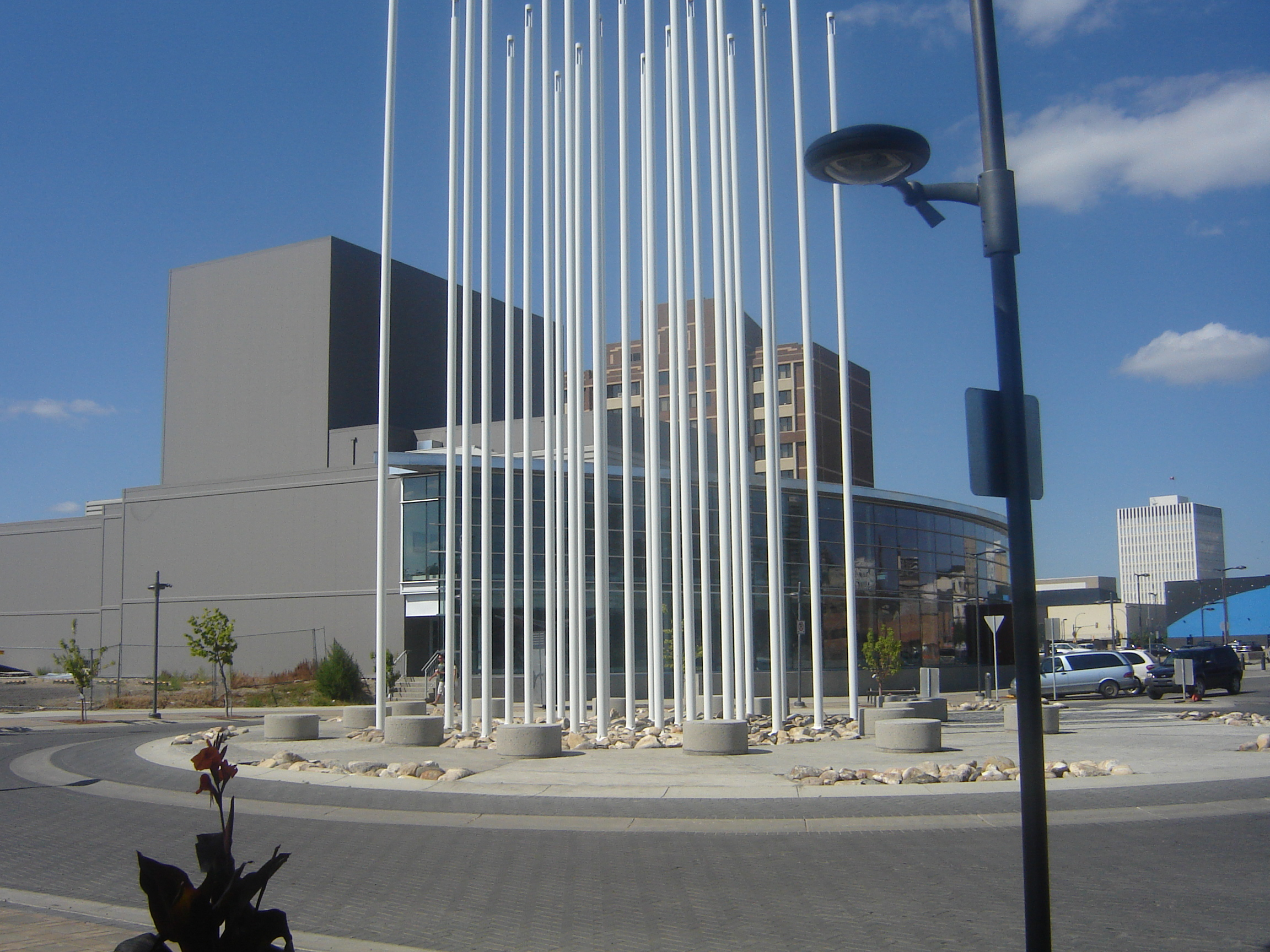
View of Persephone Theatre at River Landing. River Landing is an ongoing redevelopment project in the Central Business District.

Saskatoon is developing the South Central Business District, or block 146, which is called the River Landing Project. The CNR railyards and the Saskatoon Arena were the first buildings to fall; then the A. L. Cole Power Plant; and more recently, the Gathercole Building. It was once a high school, and later the Saskatoon Board of Education offices. Persephone Theatre is one of the first tenants on site, developing the Frank & Ellen Remai Arts Centre that opened in the winter of 2007. In December 2004, Premier Lorne Calvert, allocated $29.3 million to finance Saskatoon's River Landing project on the A. L. Cole Power Plant site.

=== Architecture ===
==== Heritage buildings ====
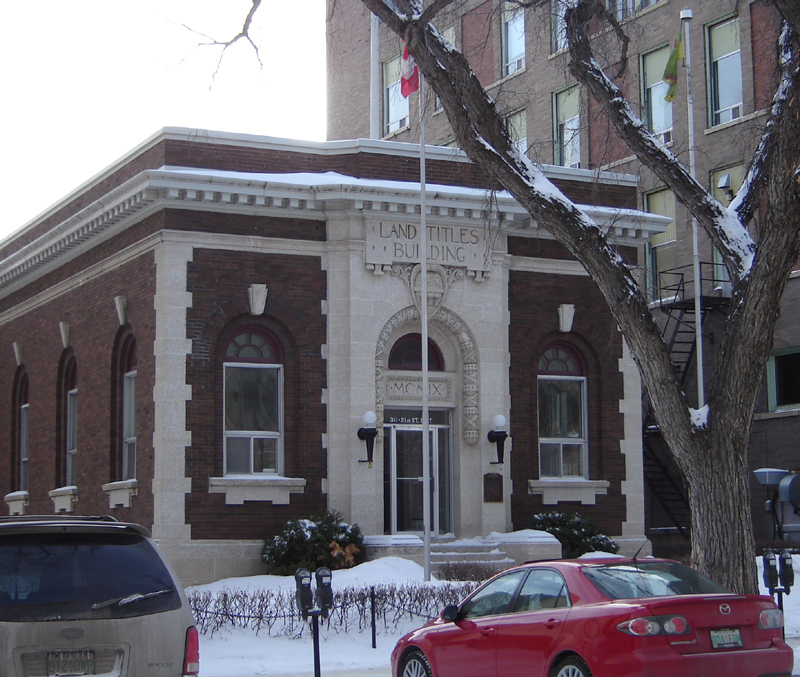
Completed in 1913, the Land Titles Building is one of several historic buildings in downtown.

- Canada Building, 105 21st Street East – 1913
- Cathedral of St. John the Evangelist, 816 Spadina Crescent east – 1913
- T. Eaton Store (Army & Navy), 3rd Avenue and 21st Street – 1928
- Fairbanks-Morse Warehouse, 1911
- Delta Bessborough Hotel, 601 Spadina Crescent East – 1931
- Senator (Flanagan) Hotel, 243 21st Street East – 1907 – on the raised balcony of the hotel, many civic leaders gave speeches to the crowd on 21st Street East in the early 1900s.
- Hutchinson Building 144 2nd Avenue South – 1923
- Knox Presbyterian Church (United), 838 Spadina Crescent East – 1914
- Land Titles Building, 1909
- Odd Fellows Temple, 416 21st Street – 1912
- Royal Bank, 241 2nd Avenue South – 1913
- Rumely Building – 1913
- Schroeder House (Barrister House), 321 6th Ave North – 1909, renovated 1986
- Saskatoon Club, 417 21st Street East – 1912
- C.P.R. Station, 305 Idylwyld Drive North – 1907
- St Mark's Anglican Church, 1406 8th Avenue North – 1939
- Third Avenue Methodist Church (United), 304 3rd Avenue North – 1912
- Thompson Chambers (Avalon Block), 206 2nd Avenue North – 1912
