= Saskatoon station (Canadian Pacific Railway) =

Railway station in Saskatchewan, Canada

Saskatoon
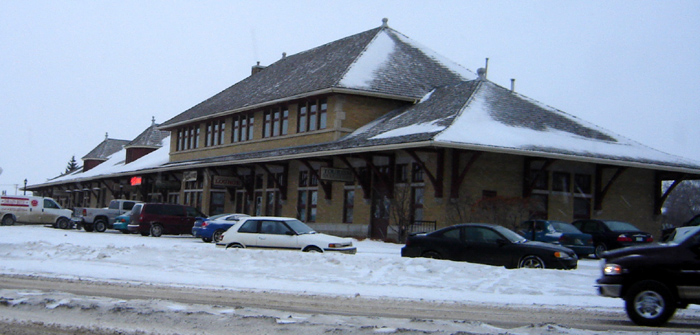
- Saskatoon station, facing the roadway

General information
- Location: 24th Street and Avenue A (now Idylwyld Drive)
- Coordinates: 52°07′56″N 106°40′16″W
- Owner: Ken Achs

Construction
- Architect: J. Carmichael

History
- Opened: 1908
- Closed: 1960
- Rebuilt: 1993 (sold to private developer)

Former services
Preceding station	Canadian Pacific Railway	Following station
Cory toward Edmonton	Edmonton – Portage la Prairie	Sutherland toward Portage la Prairie
Cory toward Baljennie	Baljennie – Saskatoon	Terminus
Perdue toward Gunnworth	Gunnworth – Saskatoon	Terminus

National Historic Site of Canada
- Official name: Saskatoon Railway Station (Canadian Pacific) National Historic Site of Canada
- Designated: 1976
Location

Saskatoon station is a historic railway station building in Saskatoon, Saskatchewan, Canada. It was built in 1908. It was designated a National Historic Site of Canada in 1976, and has also been protected as a Heritage Railway Station of Canada since 1990.

Saskatoon earned the nickname Hub City from the contributions of the CPR, CNR and GTP. The station was on the CPR's line from Portage la Prairie, Manitoba, to Edmonton, Alberta.

== Geography and location ==
Saskatoon's CP station is located at 305 Idylwyld Drive, in the Caswell Hill Neighborhood, Core Neighbourhoods Suburban Development Area.

== History ==
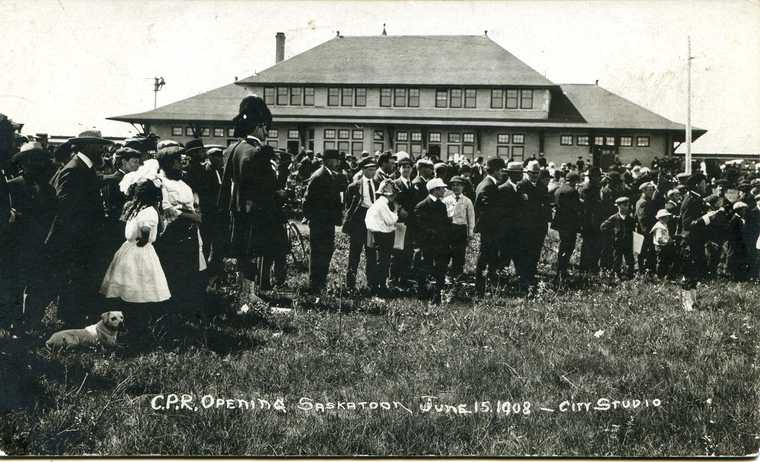
Crowd gathered for the opening of the station June 15, 1908.

Opened in 1908, the station served as a passenger depot, telegraph station, mail and freight depot. The CPR discontinued passenger service in 1960, maintaining it as an office site until 1993 when it was sold to Ken Achs who restored the building.

The CP station has not been used as a rail station for many years, and currently houses several businesses. Received the 1995 SAHS (Saskatchewan Architectural Heritage Society) Heritage Architecture Excellence Awards which was bestowed by Saskatchewan's Lieutenant-Governor.

The city of Saskatoon is served by Via Rail's The Canadian service; however, that line uses the New Saskatoon Railway Station located southwest of the downtown core.

The restored building contains approximately 1,420.6 square metres (15,291 sq ft) of floorspace and now houses several professional offices and commercial tenants.

== Nearby ==
Two other municipal heritage buildings are close to the Saskatoon Railway Station (Canadian Pacific), the Rumely Warehouse, built in 1913 and the Fairbanks Morse Warehouse. Both are located in the Central Business District which sprang up to support both the CNR railway station and railyards and the CPR. The Midtown Plaza shopping mall was built on the site of the former downtown CNR railway station in the late 1960s; in the 1990s the mall underwent a major renovation that included changing the front facade to resemble the style of the old railway station.
