= Eaton's Building =

Eaton's Building may refer to:

- Eaton's Annex, Toronto, Ontario; demolished
- Eaton's Building (Saskatoon), Saskatchewan
- Eaton's Place, Winnipeg, Manitoba, now CityPlace
- Toronto Eaton Centre, Toronto, Ontario
