= 2nd Avenue Lofts =

Building in Saskatoon, Canada

Coordinates: 52.1305°N 106.6636°W

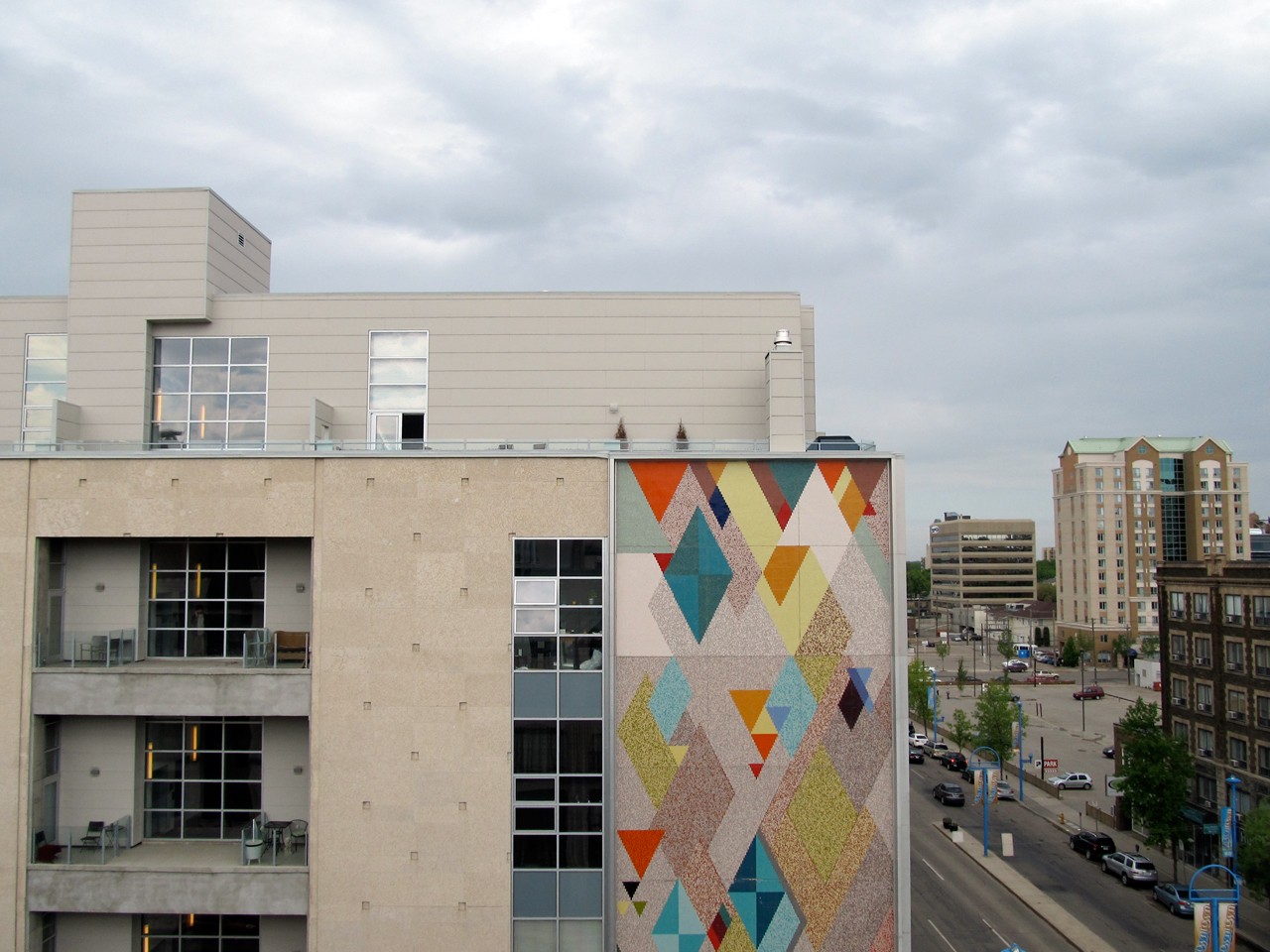
- 2nd Avenue Lofts

General information
- Location: 120 23rd Street East, Saskatoon, Saskatchewan, Canada
- Construction started: 1960
- Client: Hudson's Bay Company

The 2nd Avenue Lofts is a historic building located in the Central Business District of Saskatoon, Saskatchewan, Canada.

The original building on the site was a five-story concrete and steel building with a pressed brick facade building constructed in 1913, to house the J.F. Cairns Department Store. J. F. Cairns settled in Saskatoon in 1902, opening the first mill in the city before entering the retail business. The five-story building was built by G.H. Archibald and Company containing 90,255 square feet. The building was taken over the Hudson's Bay Company (HBC) department store chain in 1922 making it the 11th department store location for HBC. On October 14, 1922, the Chippendale style, Imperial Restaurant opened on the fourth floor, the restaurant contained banquet facilities and was used for special events in the city.

The original building was torn down, and in 1960 the Hudson's Bay Company opened in a new, more modern, three-story building on the same site. At a cost of $3 million, the building provided 157,000 square feet (14,600 m^{2}) of retail space over three floors and had provision for the addition of two more floors. In 1967, a fourth floor was added as well as a skywalk to a six-floor parkade. In 2000, HBC left the building to move into the former Eaton's location in Midtown Plaza shopping centre a few blocks away.

In 2004, Wayne Lemauviel, Gary Bender and later Gene Dub purchased the building and began work on converting the building into lofts. A fifth story was added to the building, and due to the high ceiling on each floor it was possible to create each loft with an internal mezzanine. The ground floor was retained as retail space. The same year, the skybridge across Second Avenue was removed and the parkade torn-down. The interior design on the building has won an Award of Excellence. The conversion from retail to lofts is part of a larger residential revival occurring in the central business district with an influx of people moving into the area.
