= Knox United Church =

Knox United Church may refer to:

in Canada

- Alberta
  - Knox United Church (Calgary)
- Ontario
  - Knox United Church (Ottawa)
  - Knox United Church (Scarborough)
- Saskatchewan
  - Knox United Church (Saskatoon)

in the Philippines

- Knox United Methodist Church
