= Eaton's Building (Saskatoon) =

Landmark in Saskatchewan, Canada

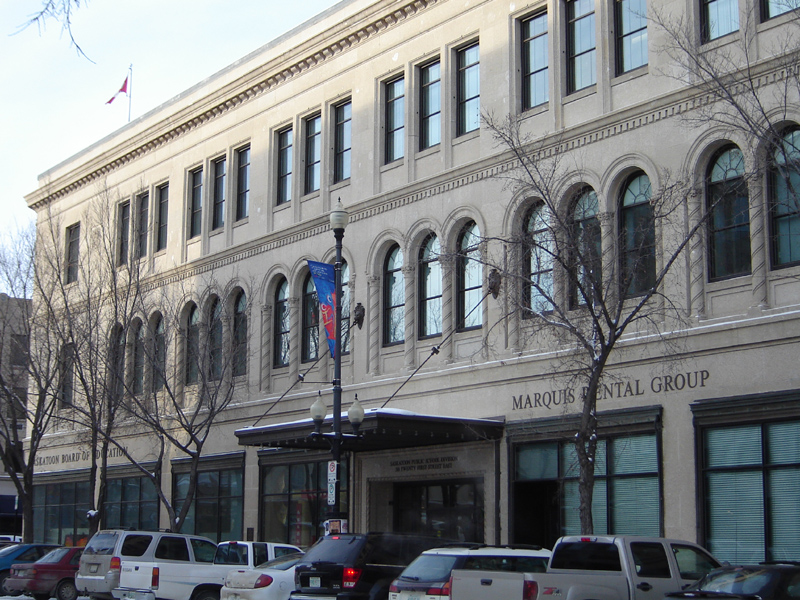
- The Eaton's Building in 2007
- Interactive map of the Eaton's Building area

General information
- Architectural style: Neo-Renaissance
- Location: 310 – 21st Street East, Saskatoon, Saskatchewan, Canada
- Coordinates: 52°07′38″N 106°39′44″W
- Completed: 1928
- Client: Eaton's

Design and construction
- Architects: Ross and Macdonald; Frank Martin

The Eaton's Building is a landmark building located in downtown Saskatoon, Saskatchewan, Canada. Formerly serving as an Eaton's department store, the building is currently occupied by the Saskatoon Board of Education.

== History ==
In 1927, Eaton's announced that it would construct an eight-storey store at the northeast corner of 3rd Avenue and 21st Street in Saskatoon's Central Business District. Designed by the Montreal architecture firm of Ross and Macdonald, along with local architect Frank Martin, the store was to have been the tallest building in the city, but was eventually built to only three storeys.

Constructed in the Neo-Renaissance style, with a tyndall stone and black marble façade and fifteen tripled-arched Palladian windows, the store opened for business on December 5, 1928. In a manner reminiscent of the Eaton's Montreal store, or of the plans for its soon-to-be-built new Toronto store, the building boasted a luxurious interior, with elaborate bronze fixtures and terrazzo flooring. The store also featured an art gallery, a children's toyland with a mechanical lion, a meat department with an 80-foot marble counter and a Mediterranean-style dining room.

In 1970, Eaton's relocated its store to the nearby Midtown Plaza. Serving briefly as athlete housing for the 1971 Canada Winter Games, the building was subsequently occupied from 1973 to 2000 by an outlet of the Army & Navy discount department store. Among the notable features of the Army & Navy store was a nautical-themed cafeteria. In the mid-1980s, the building was linked to a small shopping centre, office block and parkade that was constructed next door.

== Restoration ==
After Army and Navy vacated the building, it was purchased by the Saskatoon Board of Education. The Board undertook a revitalization of the building, which included the restoration of the façade, the terrazzo flooring, the brass fixtures on the street-level display windows, and the original wooden handrails and brass fittings on the stairways to their original condition.
