= Saskatchewan Jazz Festival =

West Canadian jazz festival

Coordinates: 52.1260°N 106.6581°W

SaskTel Saskatchewan Jazz Festival
- Genre: Blues; Jazz; World music
- Locations: Saskatoon, Saskatchewan; Canada
- Years active: 1987–2019, 2021–Present
- Website: www.saskjazz.com

The Saskatchewan Jazz Festival (formerly branded as the SaskTel Saskatchewan Jazz Festival for sponsorship reasons) is an annual outdoor music festival held in Saskatoon, Saskatchewan. Established in 1987, it has largely been held at the gardens of the Delta Bessborough hotel in Saskatoon, and features performers representing many genres—but particularly jazz, blues, and folk.

== Concerts ==
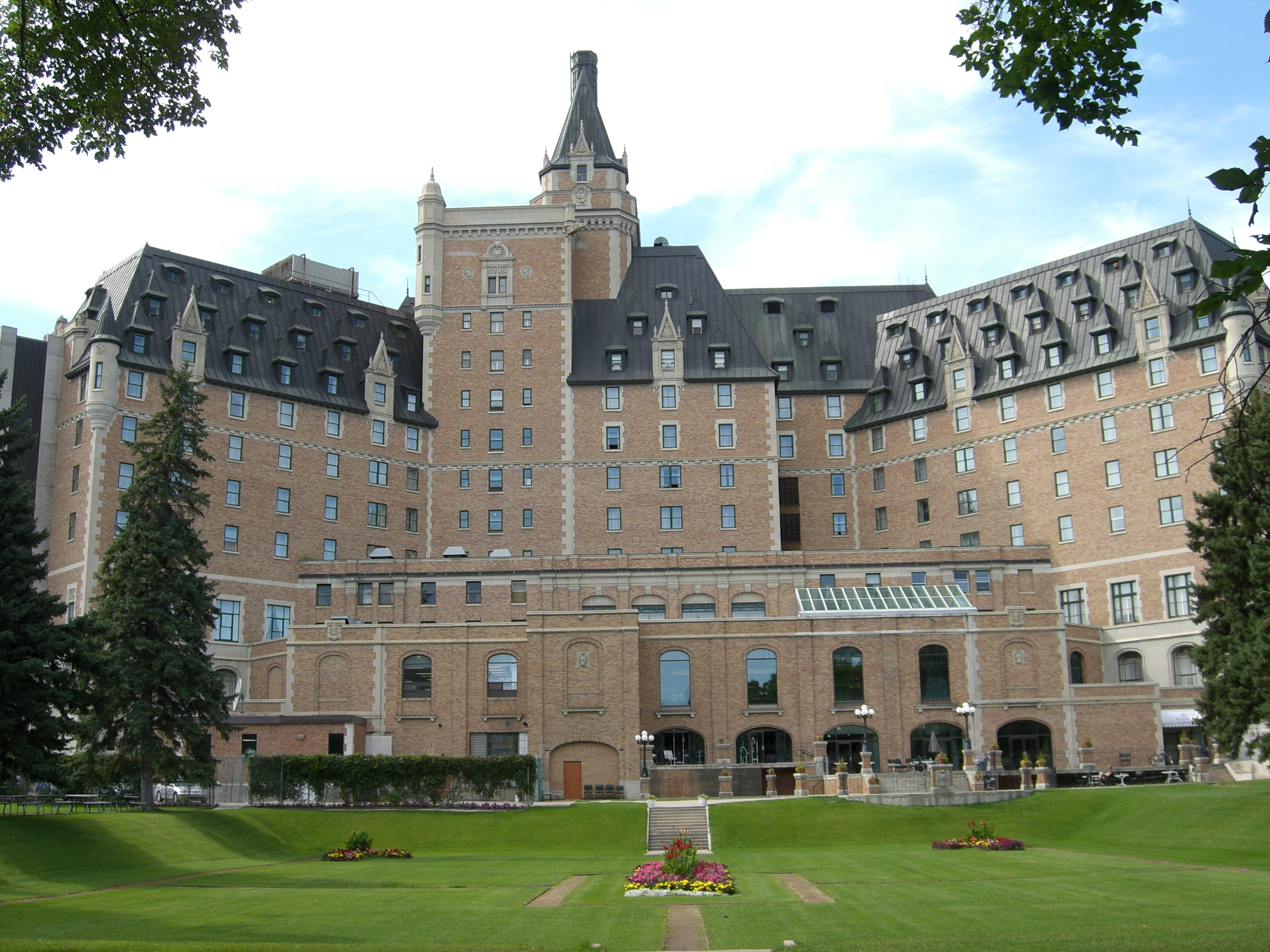
The Bessborough Gardens, the historic site of the festival's main stage.

The event features live performances from various locations in downtown Saskatoon; two of the festival's main locations have been the Delta Bessborough hotel (which hosts the ticketed "TD Mainstage" events), and Victoria Park along the South Saskatchewan River. Other festival venues have included the Broadway Theatre.

== Awards ==
The Special Recognition Award is awarded for making significant contributions to Jazz of Saskatchewan or Canada. Since 1989 musicians, educators, or supporters have received this award.

Special Recognition Award
Year	Recipient
1989	Paul Perry
1990	Gordie Brandt
1981	Chris Gage
1992	Bridge City Dixieland Jazz Band
1993	Herbie Spanier
1984	Jon Ballantyne
1995	Bob Moyer
1996	Solstice
1997	Jim Moffat
1998	Barney Kutz
1999	Bobby Klassen
2000	Don Watson
2001	Don Keeler
2002	Dr. Ed Lewis
2003	Ray Dahlen Sound
2003	Peter Dyksman
2005	Broadway Bill Watson
2006	Maurice Drouin
2007	Pat Steel
2008	Fred Ballantyne
2009	Ted Warren
2010	Jack Semple
2011	Dean McNeill
2012	Sheldon Corbett
2013	Don Griffith
2014	Kelly Jefferson
2015	Al Muirhead
2016	Barrie Redford
2017	Skip Kutz
2018	Ross Ulmer
2019	Suzie Vinnick

== History ==
The festival originated in Saskatoon and later programmed events in other Saskatchewan communities including Regina, Moose Jaw, North Battleford and Prince Albert. By 1991, du Maurier Ltd had given its support and name to the Saskatoon jazz festival as part of the company’s national arts sponsorship program. The event’s 21st annual edition took place in 2007, and it was previously considered one of the largest jazz festivals in Western Canada.

The 2020 festival was cancelled due to the COVID-19 pandemic. The event returned for 2021, although downsized with only Canadian talent due to travel restrictions. In 2022, the festival moved its free programming to Saskatoon's downtown Victoria Park, including Canada Day festivities headlined by country musician Tenille Arts. In 2023, citing economic conditions and a pivot to provide a streamlined event with more free programming, it was announced that the events held at Bessborough would be moved to Victoria Park.

== Sponsorship ==
For almost thirty years the festival carried a title partnership with the provincial Crown corporation SaskTel. In August 2025 SaskTel ended the arrangement, leaving the event without a title sponsor for the first time in decades. Festival leadership said the former title package had been worth about $150,000 per year and that the loss would require finding new supporters and reconsidering the event format for 2026.
