= Army & Navy Stores (Canada) =

Defunct Canadian department store chain

Army & Navy Stores Inc.

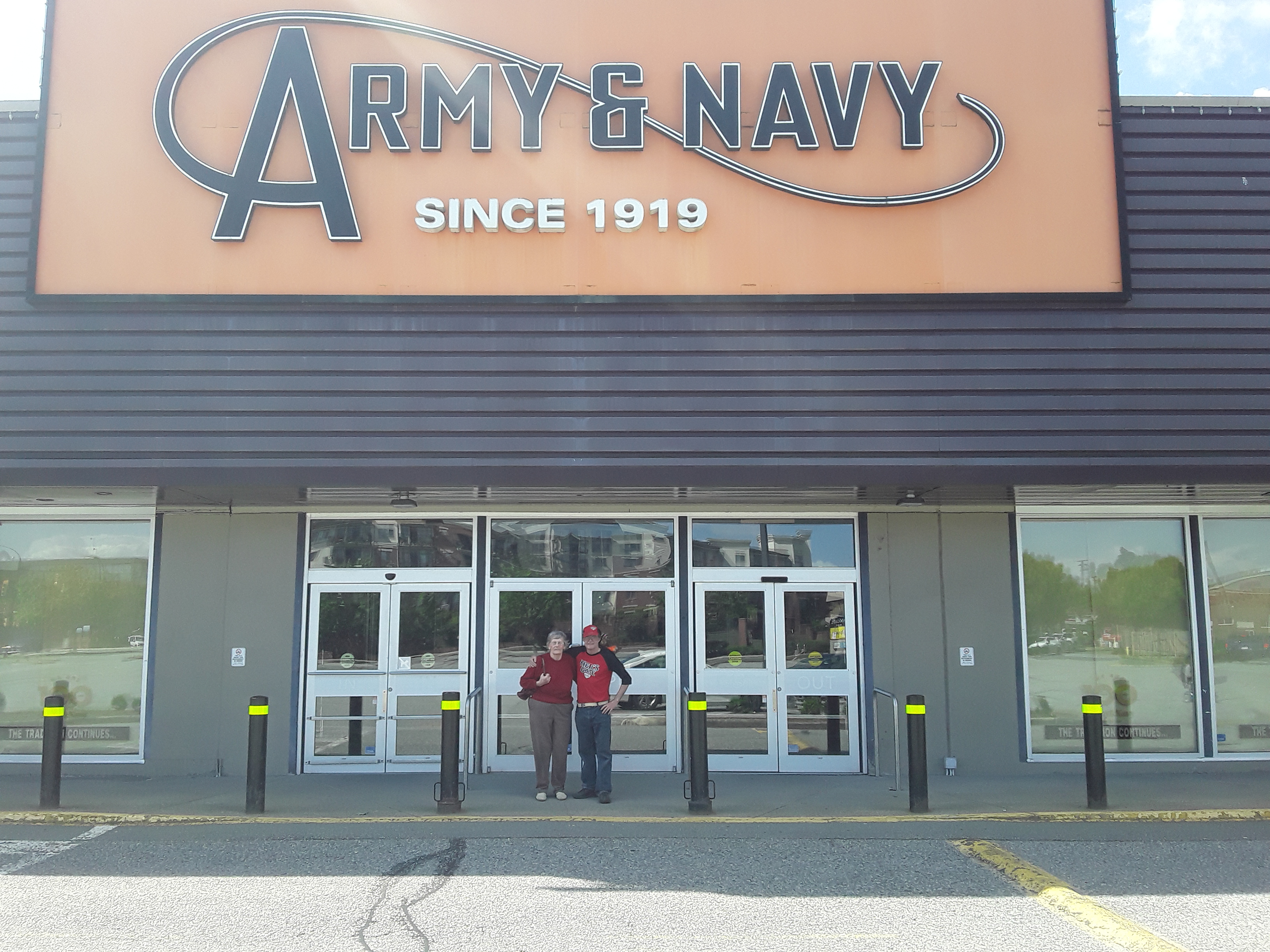
- Company type: Department store
- Industry: Retail
- Founded: 1919
- Founders: Samuel Cohen, Joseph Cohen, Harry Cohen
- Defunct: May 9, 2020
- Fate: Dissolved
- Headquarters: Vancouver, British Columbia, Canada
- Number of locations: 5
- Products: Clothing, Fishing tackle, footwear, bedding, furniture, hardware, outdoor gear, beauty products, and housewares.

Army & Navy Stores Inc. was a Canadian department store chain billing itself as "Canada's Original Discount Store". It operated five stores in Alberta and British Columbia before closing permanently on May 9, 2020.

== History ==
Samuel Joseph Cohen, Joseph Cohen ("Joe"), and Harry Cohen, Canadians, opened the first Army & Navy location in Vancouver, British Columbia on West Hastings Street in 1919, selling liquidation stock from closing, bankrupt, or destroyed stores, and World War I army and navy surplus goods at low prices.

A second store was opened in Regina, Saskatchewan on Scarth Street in 1920, and a third location was opened in Edmonton, Alberta in 1928 on 104th Street and Whyte Avenue. A fourth store opened in Moose Jaw, Saskatchewan in 1933. Army & Navy opened a store in New Westminster, British Columbia in 1939. An additional Edmonton store, located at 97th Street and 103rd Avenue east of the downtown core, was opened in 1955 and renovated and enlarged in 1968. In 1969, Army & Navy renovated and doubled the size of its Regina location.

With the death of Samuel Cohen in 1966, Garth C. Kennedy became president of the company, with Jack D. Cohen as vice-president. In 1973, Army & Navy took over a former Eaton's location in Saskatoon, Saskatchewan at 21st Street and 3rd Avenue, a location now occupied by the Saskatoon Public School Division (The Saskatoon location was known in the 1970s 1980s and 1990s for their mechanical elevators that were Operated by a Liftman who had to Open the doors manually & make the elevator move by moving a lever. The elevators were kept until one elevator was decommissioned in 1994 and replaced with a new modern elevator and the other elevator was decommissioned in 1997 and also replaced with a new modern one). In 1978, the New Westminster store moved into the former Eaton's store at 502 Columbia Street which closed in late 1977 a few blocks away and remains there today, and in 1980, an eighth location was opened in Calgary, Alberta at 1107 33rd Street NE. In 1998, CEO Garth Kennedy died and the company was turned over to Sam Cohen's granddaughter, Jacqui Cohen. In 2000 the Saskatchewan stores closed. A new store was opened in Langley, British Columbia in 2001, and in Edmonton in 2003 in Londonderry Mall (as a replacement for the aging 97th Street Store). The Londonderry Mall location closed in 2016. In May 2020 all stores closed permanently due to the challenges of operating a retail business during the COVID-19 pandemic in Canada.

Army & Navy ran a mail-order catalogue business from 1925 to 1986, making it one of the longest-running Canadian department store catalogues.
