= Canada Building (Saskatoon) =

Office block in Saskatoon, Saskatchewan, Canada

Coordinates: 52°7′37.85″N 106°39′57.10″W

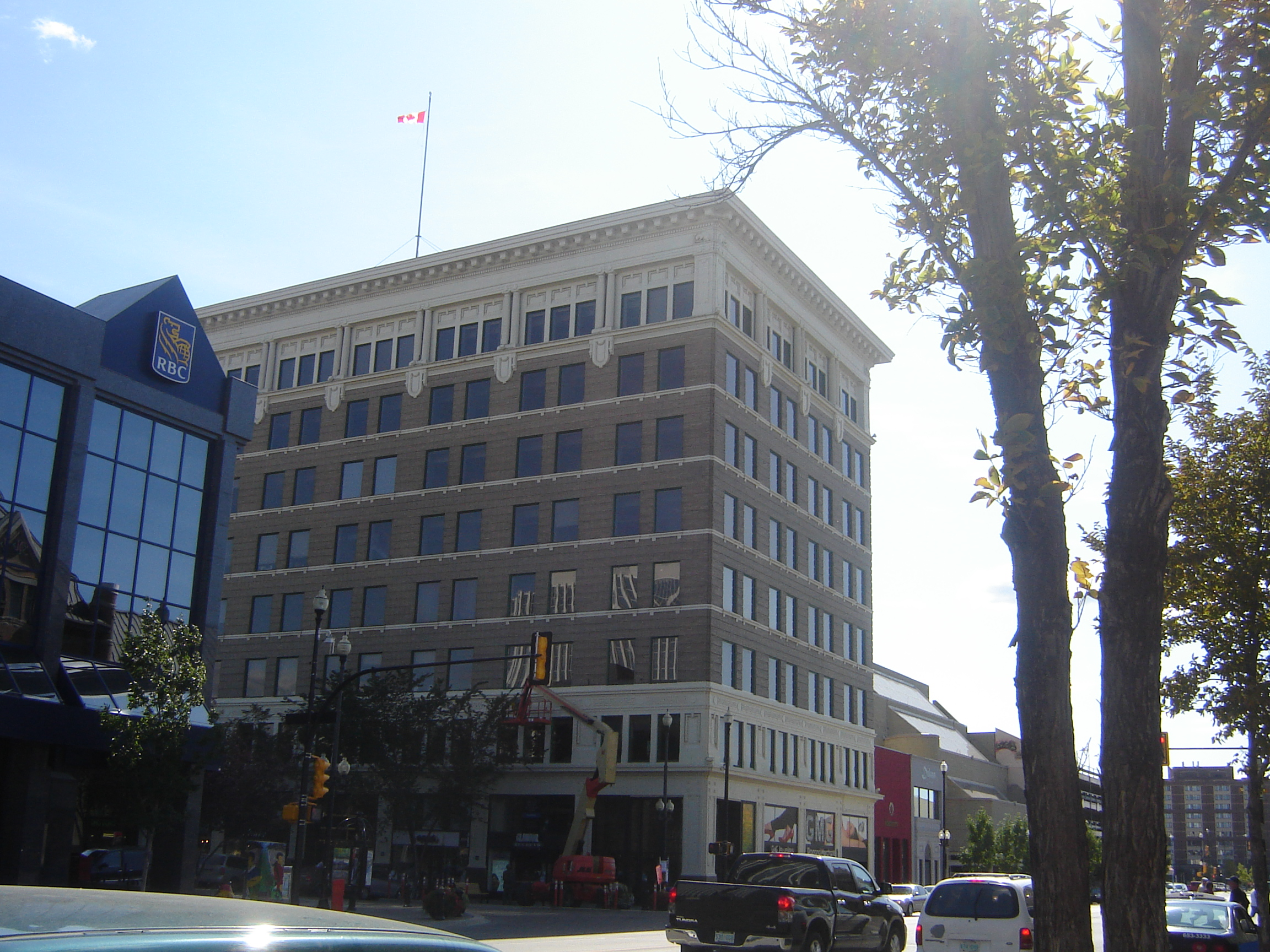
- Canada Building
- Interactive map of the Canada Building area

General information
- Architectural style: Chicago school
- Location: 105 21st Street East, Saskatoon, Saskatchewan, Canada
- Construction started: 1912
- Completed: 1913
- Client: Allan Bowerman

Technical details
- Floor count: 8

Design and construction
- Architect: James Chisholm

The Canada Building (built in 1913) is a historic eight-story office block in the Central Business District of Saskatoon, Saskatchewan, Canada. The building is 35.05 m (115.0 ft) in height featuring red granite facing on the base, with terra cotta details on the lower two floors and cornice near the roof. The office building features large bison heads flanking the main doorway.

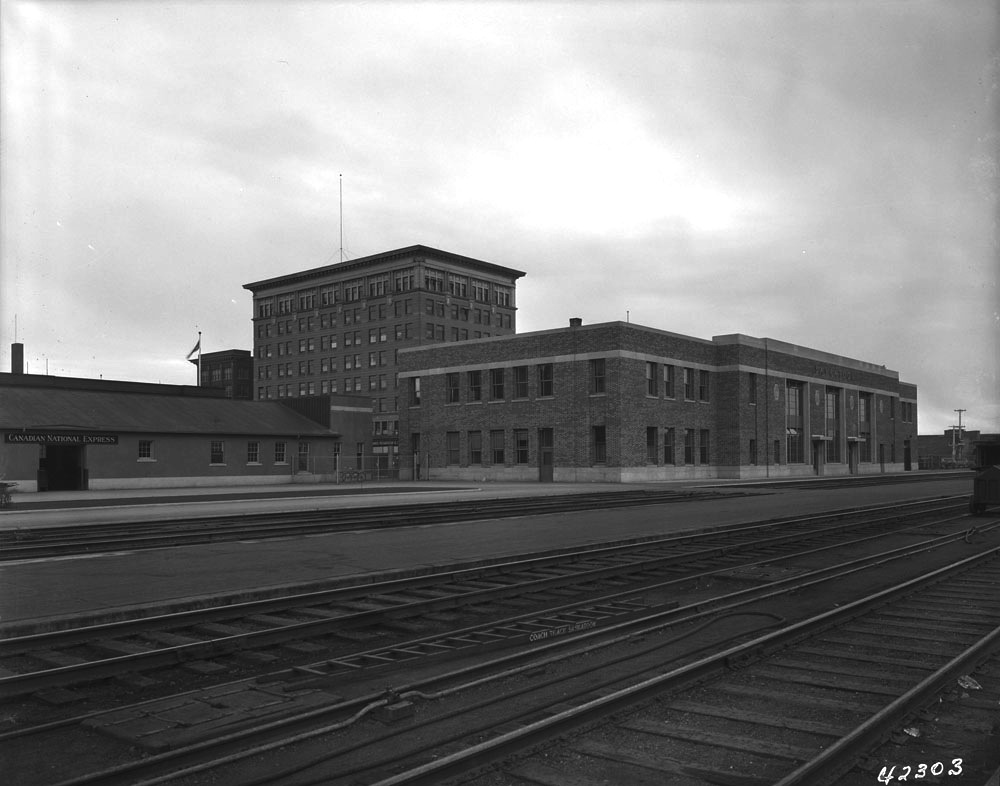
Canada Building in 1940, behind recently built CNR station (demolished in the 1960s)

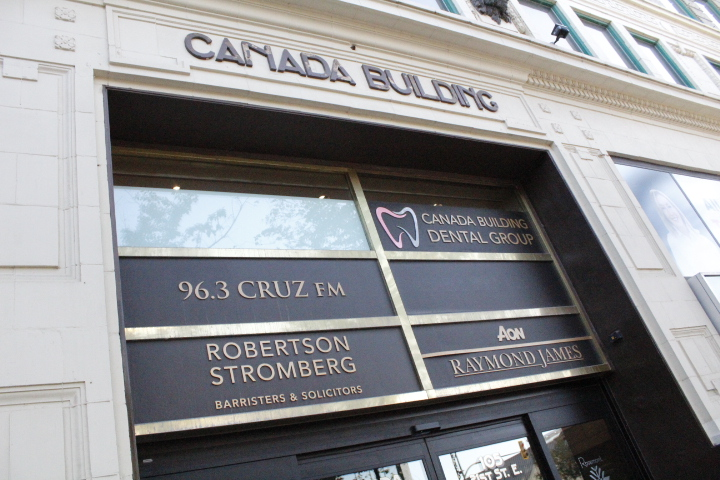

The office building was built by Allan Bowerman. Bowerman was also responsible for the development of the Bowerman House.

Preceded by	Tallest Building in Saskatoon; 1913-1932; 35.05 m	Succeeded by Delta Bessborough
