= Linda Duvall =

Canadian artist

Linda Duvall is a Canadian artist and educator based in Saskatchewan and Toronto. Her social art projects, exhibitions and research have taken up questions of conscience, truth, and the nature of interpersonal relationships, particularly as they are enacted through conversation. Her art employs photography, video, installation, performance art, and community-based research including Internet-based archiving. They often feature invitations for individuals or groups to participate in specific tasks involving conversation or expression. Overall Duvall's work investigates speech acts (such as, confessions, gossip and expressions of regret), the nature of truth, the process of grieving, intimacy and vulnerability. Her solo exhibitions have been hosted by Art Gallery of Hamilton, Dunlop Art Gallery, Art Gallery of Mississauga, Museo Nacional de Arte Moderno Guatemala City, Custom House Gallery Westport Ireland, Box Hotel Gallery Barcelona and Thunder Bay Art Gallery. She has served on a number of boards of artist-run organizations including, Paved Arts, Red Head Gallery, The Photographer's Gallery (now known as PAVED Arts), BlackFlash Magazine.

== Educational Background ==
Linda Duvall studied sociology and English at Carleton University and education at Queen's University. She earned an A.O.C.A diploma from Ontario College of Art and Master of Fine Arts degrees from University of Michigan in Ann Arbor and Transart Institute.

== Artistic Practice ==
Linda Duvall moved with her family from Ontario to Saskatoon, Saskatchewan in 1993, where she taught at the University of Saskatchewan. Following studies in sociology and English, Duvall has produced artworks that have situated conversation, dialogue, and cultural exchange as both methods and artistic results. In 1997 her work, Traducción/Translation was presented at Museo Nacional de Arte Moderno in Guatemala City and later at The Photographer's Gallery in Saskatoon (now known as PAVED Arts). This work superimposed handwritten Spanish quotations from immigrants about Saskatchewan onto images of the Canadian prairies. A number of her works invite and present more intimate conversational exchanges, such as Tea Gone Cold (1999), in an exhibition called Antipathies and Correspondences: Rae Staseson, Linda Duvall, Joanne Bristol, at the Mendel Gallery (now known as Remai Modern Art Gallery of Saskatchewan), and Tea and Gossip (2003, Red Head Gallery, Toronto; 2004, Kenderdine Art Gallery, University of Saskatchewan, and other locations).

With the 2005 work, Lament (Red Head Gallery and Agnes Etherington Art Centre in 2008), Duvall's work turned to more sorrowful modes of discourse. In Lament, Duvall presented audio recordings of people reading public laments such as, confessions, pleas of apology or regret, and announcements of unexpected tragedy or death. Audience members were invited to participate in these public readings, while visual footage of Duvall involved in a violent police incident was visible in the room. The work, She Can't Begin (2007, Red Head Gallery), presented the artist's own words in response to her 23-year-old son's suicide superimposed on video images of the prairie landscape of his death. Also in direct response to these events she produced a small artist's book, Desperately Sorry Emails (2008) as a magazine insert in BlackFlash.

In 2009 a major work resulted from Duvall's collaborative work with organizations supporting incarcerated individuals and their families. Where were the Mothers? (Art Gallery of Mississauga and Dunlop Art Gallery) is a gallery-based video installation as well as a professionally produced audio CD featuring songs written and performed by individuals who as the CD brochure describes "have had run-ins with the law, lived or worked on the street, dealt with addictions or participated in illegal street gangs."

Street-involved women are the subject of Living in 10 Easy Lessons (2012, G44 Centre for Contemporary Photography) which Duvall produced in collaboration with artist, Peter Kingstone, and women who they met through Adelaide Resource Centre for Women in Toronto. This work resulted in an exhibition of photo, text and video, as well as an educational materials (posters, brochures) which were distributed throughout the city. A discussion event involving community service providers was organized by the gallery in conjunction with the exhibition. Critical reactions to the project questioned the way the participants, who were visually identifiable in the exhibition and educational materials, were presented as wilfully circulating illicit methods of survival. Published reactions to Living in 10 Easy Lessons and other Duvall works also emphasize the way the speech acts of participants in Duvall's art works disrupt the authority of public and cultural institutions.

Also in 2012, a solo exhibition entitled The Toss (Gallery TPW) took up again Duvall's personal experience with police violence, the media footage of which had been frequently broadcast in local TV advertising and was included in her 2005 work, Lament. For this project, the artist displayed using video footage, her own process of learning the technique of tossing assailants that was used on her by the police, and her own use of the technique in realistically staged scenarios.

In more recent work, Duvall has actively solicited the voices of those familiar with cultural production to participate in her projects. In The Unacknowledged (2016, Remai Modern Art Gallery), she invited artists as well as theologians, poets, lawyers, inmates, filmmakers, health care workers and street-involved women to produce commemorative panels for individuals whose bodies were not identified after death. The new work, In the Hole (2017), invites artists to spend 6 hours a day (for up to three days) in a large hole dug into the earth on her rural Saskatchewan property. At the same time, visitors to the gallery at PAVED Arts in Saskatoon (60 miles away) will view what is captured on the camera installed in the hole.

== Publications ==
- Duvall, Linda, Peggy Gale, David Garneau, Rubén Gaztambide-Fernández, and musicians. Linda Duvall : Where Were the Mothers? Exhibition catalogue and CD music recording. Mississauga, Ont. : Art Gallery of Mississauga, 2009.
- Duvall, Linda, Jansma, Linda, and Ring, Dan. Linda Duvall : Enough White Lies to Ice a Wedding Cake. Oshawa, ON: Robert McLaughlin Gallery, 2005.
