= Knox United Church (Saskatoon) =

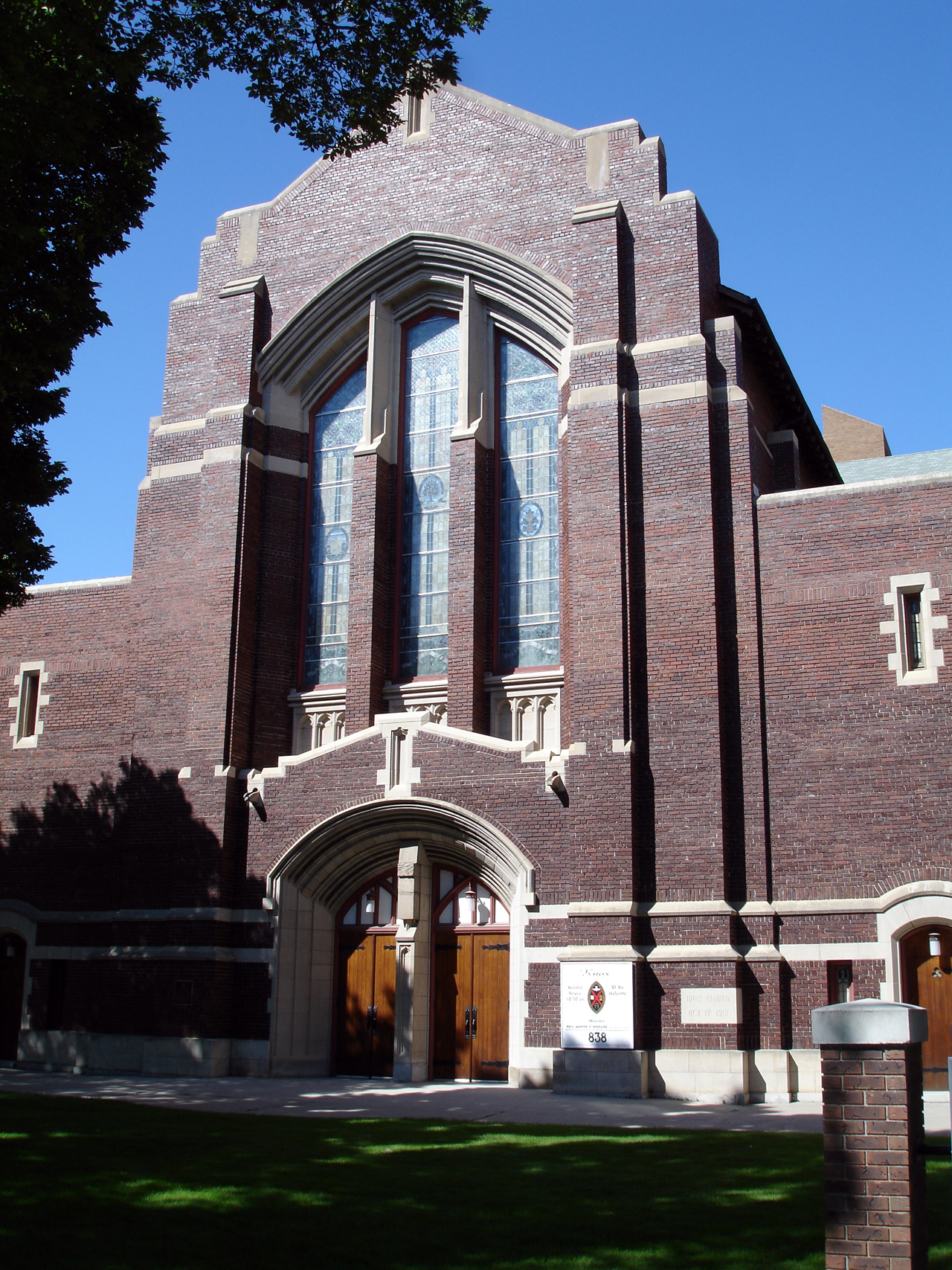
- Knox United Church front
- Knox United Church
- 52°7′50.12″N 106°39′16.2″W
- Denomination: United Church of Canada
- Website: www.knoxunitedchurch.ca

Architecture
- Functional status: Active
- Heritage designation: City of Saskatoon municipal heritage property
- Designated: October 16, 2003
- Architect(s): Brown and Vallance
- Style: Collegiate Gothic
- Groundbreaking: 1912
- Completed: 1914

Administration
- Province: Saskatchewan

Knox United Church is a designated municipal heritage building at 838 Spadina Crescent East, in the Central Business District, of Saskatoon, Saskatchewan, Canada.

The congregation was established as part of the Saskatoon Presbyterian Field Mission in 1885 after the North-West Rebellion. Meetings were held in homes, the Old Stone Schoolhouse, the Methodist Church and even the railway roundhouse until a wood church holding 160 was constructed near the river.

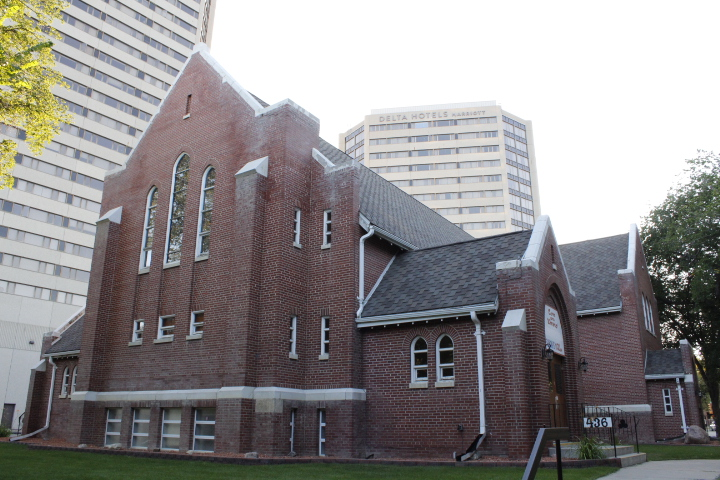

Architects Brown and Vallance of Montreal designed the present-day church in the Collegiate Gothic style. Construction started in 1912 and was completed in 1914. The two-storey building is made of dark red brick walls, features stained-glass windows, and has seating 1,200. The acoustic qualities of the church have made it a regular venue for various social and cultural events, including chamber music performances. The Institute for stained glass in Canada has documented the stained glass at Knox United Church
