= TCU Place =

- Interactive map of TCU Place
- Former names: Saskatoon Centennial Auditorium
- Location: 35 22nd Street East; Saskatoon, Saskatchewan, Canada
- Coordinates: 52°07′43″N 106°40′04″W
- Capacity: 2,003 (Main stage)
- Type: Convention centre Performing arts center

Construction
- Opened: April 1, 1968
- Expanded: 2006

Website
- TCU Place

TCU Place, formerly known as the Saskatoon Centennial Auditorium, is a 104,000-square-foot (9,700 m^{2}) convention and arts centre in Saskatoon, Saskatchewan, Canada. Situated in the Central Business District it is located next to Midtown Plaza.

The Saskatoon Centennial Auditorium was opened April 1, 1968, and was designed by Kerr Cullingworth Riches Associates. Its first performance was a performance of Orff's Carmina Burana by the Saskatoon Symphony Orchestra.

It was named in honour of Canada's recently completed centennial celebrations. It was part of a major redevelopment of Saskatoon's downtown following the closure of its CNR station; the project also saw the construction of the Midtown Plaza mall. In 2006 the centre underwent major renovation with funding from TCU Financial Group, giving it naming rights for 10 years as TCU Place Arts & Convention Centre. In 2013, TCU renewed the naming rights until 2026.

The Sid Buckwold Theatre, located within TCU Place is a 2,003 seat performing arts theatre. The theatre is home to the Saskatoon Symphony Orchestra and aside from hosting major arts performances and conventions, the venue alternates with Regina's Conexus Arts Centre as host of the Telemiracle telethons.

== Future ==
A 2018 study recommended the construction of a new arena and convention centre in the downtown area to replace TCU Place and SaskTel Centre. Both venues were stated to be "quickly approaching their end-of-useful life" and not meeting standards in comparison to venues in equivalent markets, with TCU Place in particular "[falling] behind current industry standards for flexible/adaptable spaces, acoustics, exhibit spaces, kitchen service, and typical convention requirements".
