= Rumely Building =

Building in Saskatoon, Canada

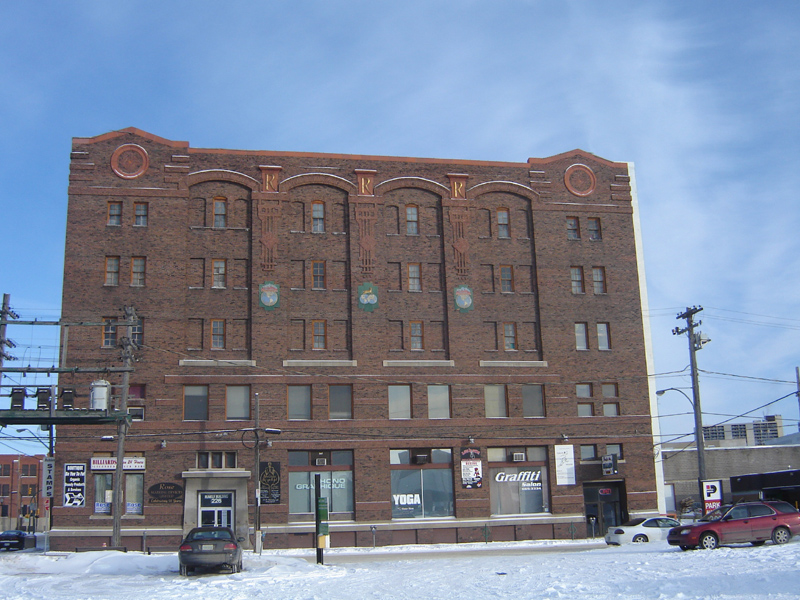
- Rumley Building (Prior to conversion to condominiums)
- Interactive map of the Rumely Building area
- Alternative names: Rumely Warehouse

General information
- Location: Saskatoon, Saskatchewan, Canada, 244-226 Pacific Avenue
- Coordinates: 52°7′55″N 106°40′0″W
- Construction started: April 1912
- Completed: 1913
- Client: Rumely Company

Technical details
- Floor count: 5

Design and construction
- Architecture firm: Hill and Woltersdorf

Renovating team
- Architect: Heney Klypak
- Renovating firm: Paradigm Developments

The Rumely Building is a heritage building located at 244–226 Pacific Avenue in the Central Business District of Saskatoon, Saskatchewan, Canada. Formerly serving as a warehouse for the Rumely Company, the building has been converted into residential condominium lofts with commercial units located on the ground floor.

== History ==
The M. Rumely Company (a manufacturer of heavy farm equipment) in April 1912 started work on the construction of a new showroom/office/warehouse building on a railway spur line in the downtown area of Saskatoon. The 12-by-25-foot (3.7 by 7.6 m) elevator and 9-inch (230 mm) thick floor permitted heavy equipment to be stored on the upper floors.

In 2007, work started on five store additions on the south side of the building and conversion of the building into 30 condominium lofts.
