= Persephone Theatre =

Theatre company in Saskatoon, Canada

- Type: Non-profit
- Industry: Theatre
- Founded: 1974
- Headquarters: Remai Arts Centre, Saskatoon, Saskatchewan, Canada
- Key people: Heather Cant (Artistic Director) Breanne Harmon (Executive Director); Del Surjik (former Artistic Director); Tibor Feheregyhazi (former Artistic Director) Janet and Susan Wright (founders)
- Revenue: 1,095,910 Canadian dollar (2003)
- Total assets: 743,529 Canadian dollar (2003)
- Number of employees: 82 (2003)
- Website: persephonetheatre.org

Persephone Theatre is a regional theatre company in Saskatoon, Saskatchewan, Canada. The company was founded in 1974 by director Brian Richmond and sisters Janet Wright and Susan Wright and named after the Greek goddess Persephone. The first season performances were held at the Mendel Art Gallery, with the second season at the University of Saskatchewan's Greystone Theatre and the third season at the St. Thomas Wesley Church hall.

After a number of short-term Artistic Directors, in 1982 Hungarian-born Tibor Feheregyhazi was named to the position. In 1983, the theatre moved into the vacated Westgate Alliance Church. In 2007, after a successful capital campaign, Persephone Theatre moved to its current facility, the Remai Arts Centre at River Landing. Shortly before the move, Tibor Feheregyhazi died after a lengthy battle with cancer.

The Remai Arts Centre facility, located on the riverbank in downtown Saskatoon, includes a 421-seat proscenium Main Stage, a 150-seat black box second stage (the Backstage Stage), two classrooms, and two rehearsal halls, as well as box office, administrative offices, a scene shop, costume shop, and storage. The facility is often rented by other cultural groups, and for corporate and private events.

From 2007 to 2020, Del Surjik served as artistic director. Originally from Saskatchewan, Surjik relocated from Vancouver, British Columbia, where he had been artistic director of Pi Theatre for 10 years.

In 2021, Saskatchewan-born Heather Cant assumed the role of artistic director, and in 2022 Breanne Harmon (former general manager at Green Thumb Theatre in Vancouver, BC) joined as executive director. Persephone Theatre now runs a full season of Mainstage productions, second stage for its Youth Series and community programming, and runs its youth tours throughout the province. The Persephone School of Theatre provides workshops and classes for children, youth, adult amateurs and theatre professionals.

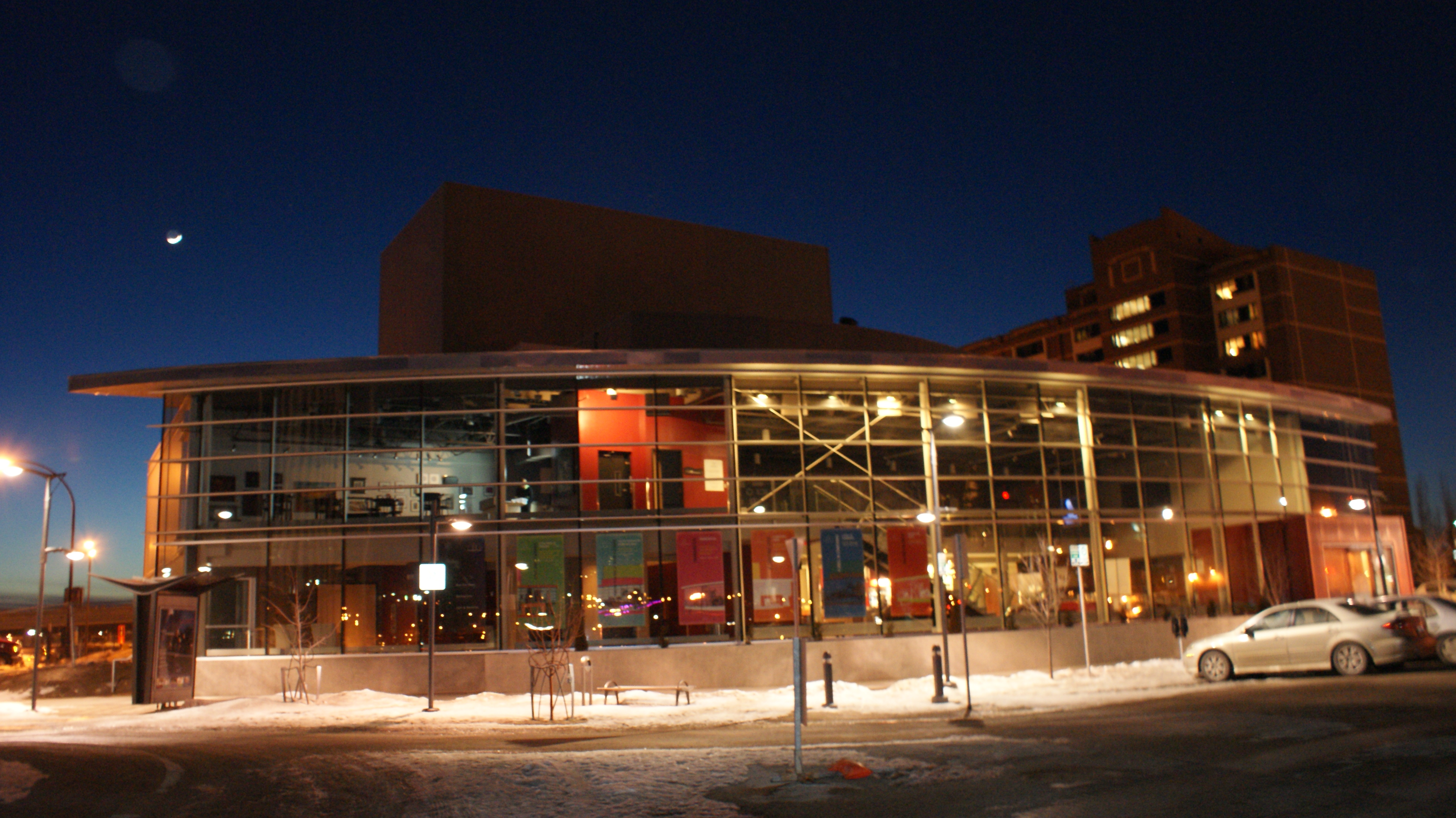
Remai Arts Centre
