= PAVED Arts =

PAVED Arts is a new media art Artist run centre located in Saskatoon, Saskatchewan, Canada that focuses on photography, audio, video, electronic and digital art. PAVED operates an access centre for media production and post-production and an exhibition space for works falling within their mandate.

== History ==
PAVED Arts was created March 31, 2003, as an amalgamation of The Photographers Gallery and Video Vérité. In June 2005 it was determined that the centre needed a new space, and along with the Saskatoon Artist-run centre AKA Gallery, PAVED moved into 424 20th Street West. PAVED is a member of the Independent Media Arts Alliance.

== Significance ==
PAVED's importance to the city of Saskatoon and the Canadian Arts community is underlined by Former Saskatchewan Labour Minister David Forbes statement in 2007 that "It is important that artists are able to pursue viable careers in Saskatchewan ... the 20 Above Arts Centre will provide increased access to creative and professional opportunities for young artistic talent to stay in the province." PAVED sees itself as a way of “democratizing art and increasing access to the ability to make art”. Other important contributions to Canadian art include the hosting of an online database and digital archive called Upstream Saskatchewan containing hundreds of photographic and video works, and the commissioning of Coincidence Engines by Montreal-based artists' collective [The User].

PAVED Arts is the only artist-run new media access point in Saskatoon. Within the city PAVED also has outreach programs facilitating, among other things, inner-city youth in recording their own hip-hop tracks. Located in the Riversdale neighborhood of Saskatoon, PAVED uses art as a way to create dialogue with other residents; one commissioned project was designed by artist Linda Duvall with the idea that “instead of being passive, there is a commitment to having art act as a form of engagement." Another, more recent commission was a series of politically relevant advertisement-like billboards drawing attention to NIMBY situations citywide. PAVED is also important as a site of dialogue regarding the voice of Canadian First Nations people, facilitating, with shows like 21 (curated by Elwood Jimmy) and screenings of Ali Kazimi's Shooting Indians, discussion of the predicament of First Nations people in Canada and the historical roots of it. In these ways, PAVED has assisted young First Nations people in Saskatoon to express the reality of their lives through art.
