= Fairbanks-Morse Warehouse (Saskatoon) =

Heritage building in canada

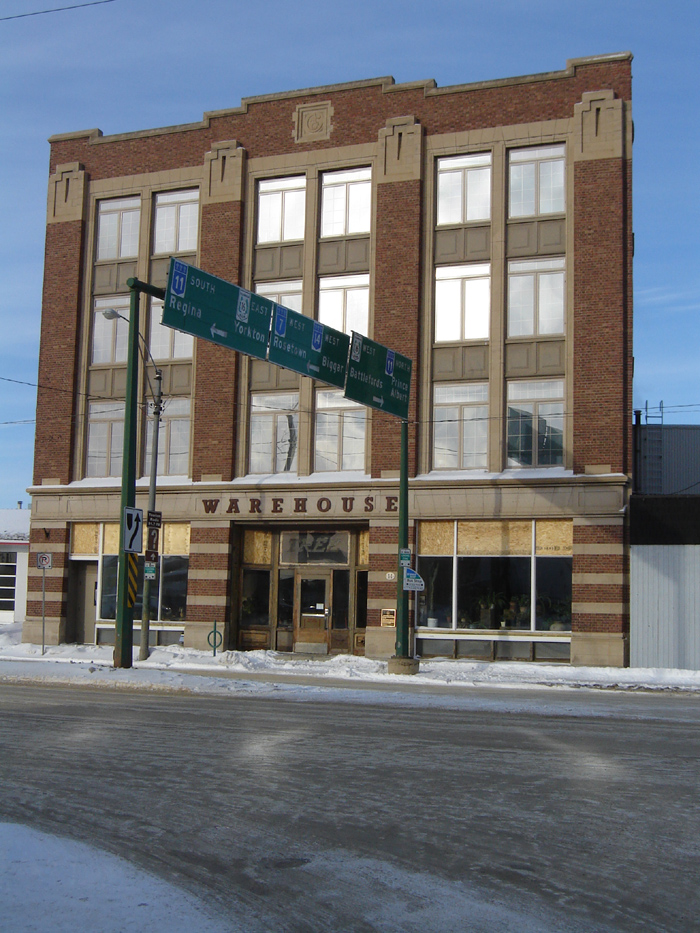
- Fairbanks-Morse Warehouse
- Interactive map of the Fairbanks-Morse Warehouse area
- Alternative names: The Morse, Warehouse

General information
- Architectural style: Classical Revival
- Location: Saskatoon, Saskatchewan, Canada, 14 23rd Street East
- Coordinates: 52°7′53.94″N 106°40′9.89″W
- Construction started: 1911
- Completed: 1911
- Renovated: 2005-2006

Technical details
- Floor count: 4

Design and construction
- Architecture firm: Brown and Vallance

Renovating team
- Renovating firm: Olstar Developments

The Fairbanks-Morse Warehouse is a heritage building located at 14 23rd Street East in downtown Saskatoon, Saskatchewan, Canada. Formerly serving as a warehouse for the Fairbanks-Morse Company, the building has been converted into residential condominium lofts.

== History ==
Canadian Fairbanks Company (later Canadian Fairbanks-Morse Company) built the structure in 1911 as a warehouse for its large machinery and mill supply business. It was designed by David Brown and Hugh Vallance of Montreal, who also designed many of the original buildings on the University of Saskatchewan campus. It was built with reinforced concrete, uncommon at that time.

From 1948 until 1985 the Fairbanks-Morse Warehouse served as the home to the Co-operative Commonwealth Federation and as a union hall. The building had CPR spur line until the mid-1960s, when much of the downtown was redeveloped. It changed hands several times, serving as a warehouse, offices, photography studio and art gallery. Some tenants of note include AKA Gallery, The Photographers Gallery and Video Vérité (of which the latter two would merge to become PAVED Arts). The building was declared a heritage site by the city on December 9, 1995.

In 2005–2006, Olstar Developments converted the building into 12 condominium loft spaces.
