= Remai Arts Centre =

Coordinates: 52°07′23″N 106°40′01″W

Frank & Ellen Remai Arts Centre
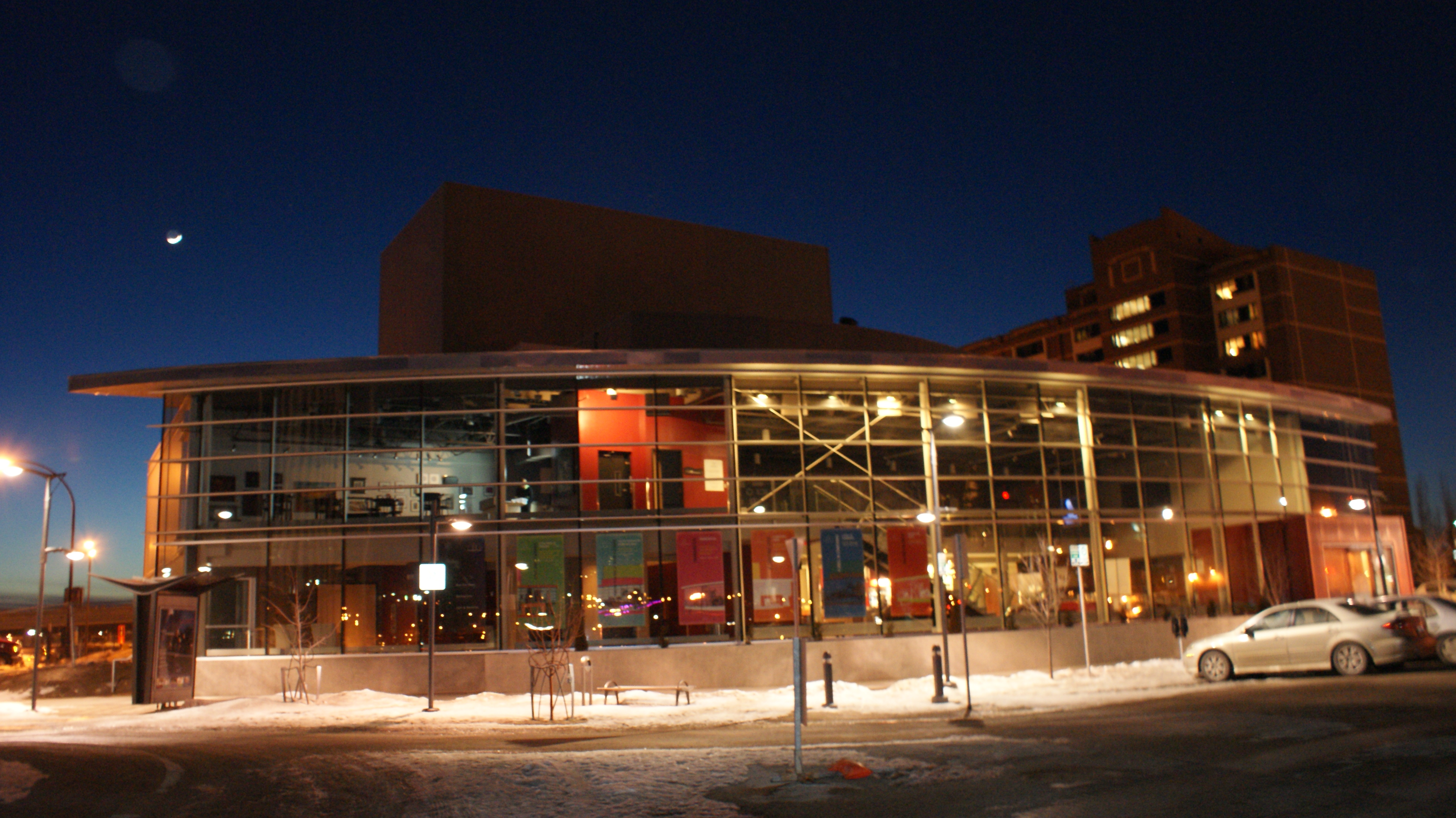
- Interactive map of Frank & Ellen Remai Arts Centre
- Location: Saskatoon, Saskatchewan, Canada
- Capacity: 450 (main stage); 100 (second stage)
- Type: Performing arts center

Construction
- Opened: 2007

Website
- www.persephonetheatre.org

Frank & Ellen Remai Arts Centre is a performing arts centre in the River Landing area of Saskatoon, Saskatchewan, Canada. The centre is owned by and the main venue for the Persephone Theatre. Constructed in 2007 at a cost of $11 Million Canadian, the main theatre seats 450, with a second smaller 100-seat theatre and other supporting facilities and workshops that make up the centre.

The Remai Modern art gallery is adjacent and connected to the Remai Arts Centre. Both facilities share an underground parking garage.

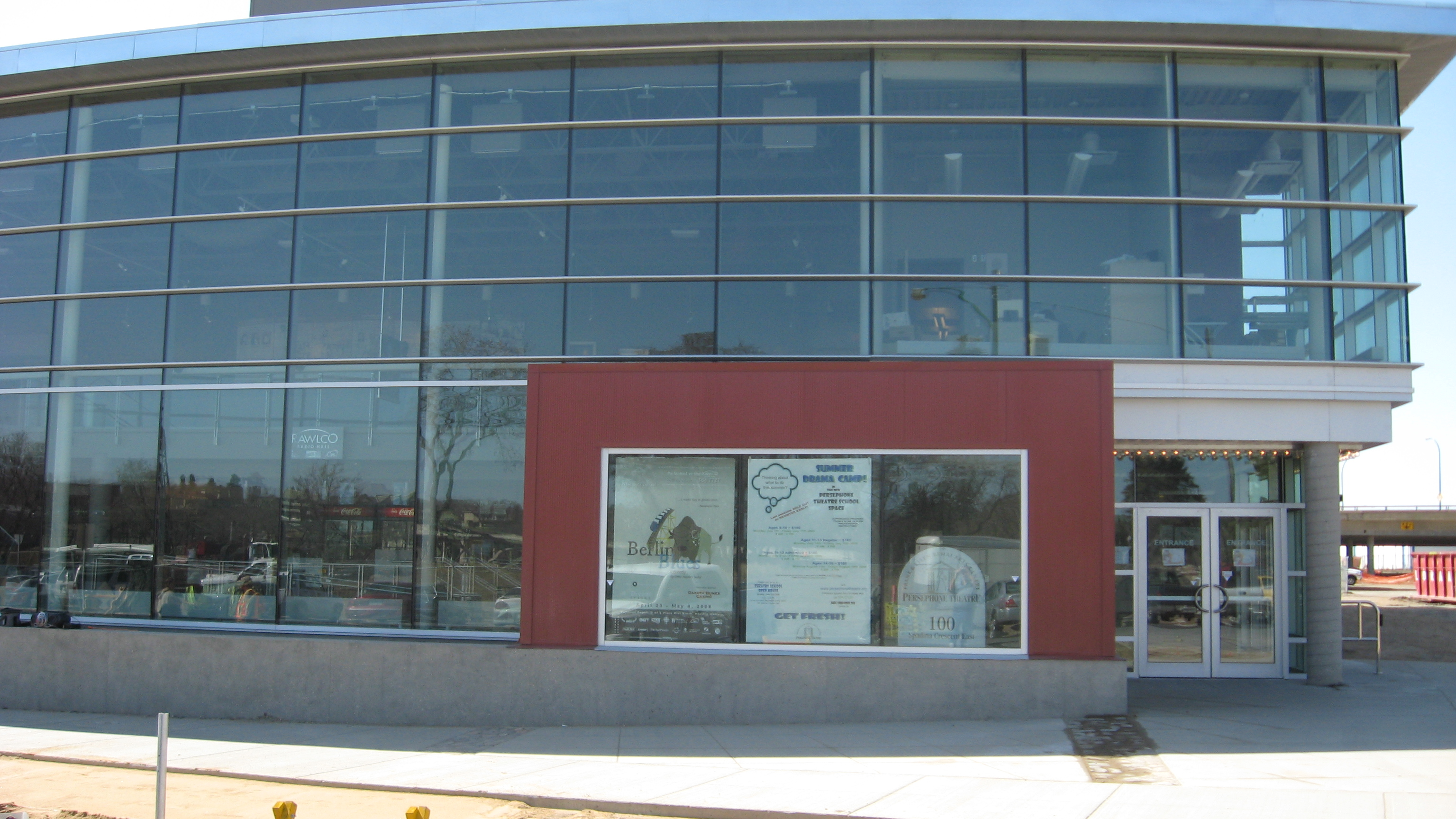
Persephone Theatre
