= Midtown Plaza (Saskatoon) =

Midtown
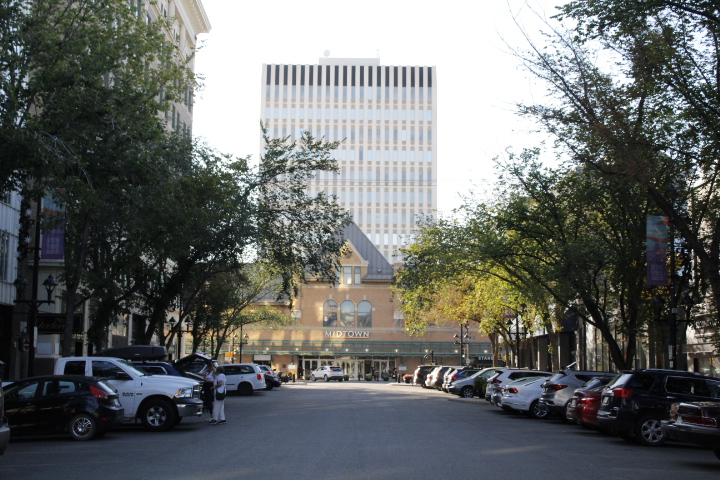
- Midtown main entrance showing the tower in the summer of 2024
- Coordinates: 52°7′39.61″N 106°40′1.99″W
- Address: 201 1st Avenue South; Saskatoon, Saskatchewan; S7K 1J9
- Opened: 1968 (Simpson-Sears only); July 30, 1970 (full mall); renovated 1990, 2004, 2019
- Manager: Terry Napper
- Num. of stores: 154
- Num. of anchor tenants: 1
- Floor area: 616,282 sq ft (57,254.5 m^{2}) / 96,883 sq ft (9,000.7 m^{2}) retail
- Floors: 2 (mall); 11 (tower)
- Parking: 1,000 surface north, south and Sears lot and 800 underground
- Website: shopmidtown.ca

Midtown (formerly Midtown Plaza) is a shopping mall in Saskatoon, Saskatchewan, Canada, located in the Central Business District neighbourhood. The shopping centre has a total store count of 154 stores. The mall was built on the former site of the city's main railway station as part of a major inner city redevelopment project in the 1960s that also saw construction of a freeway, the Senator Sid Buckwold Bridge, TCU Place (formerly Centennial Auditorium) - an arts-convention complex - and a new facility for the city's YMCA.

== History ==
The mall officially opened with 51 stores and services; as well as an extensive underground parking garage; on July 30, 1970. One of its anchor tenants, Simpsons-Sears (Sears Canada), opened for business in 1968, more than a year ahead of the rest of the mall, but closed in January 2018. Eaton's was the mall's second anchor until that chain went out of business in the holiday season of 1999; The Bay (later branded Hudson's Bay) subsequently relocated to the mall from its corner of 2nd Avenue & 23rd Street standalone location. From its opening until its late-1980s renovation, the mall had a corridor connecting directly to the auditorium, which was usually utilized as an exit from the facility; there was also a corridor connecting the auditorium to the mall's parking garage. One early tenant of the mall was Midtown Cinema, the city's first mall-based movie theatre; it later split into two cinemas to become Saskatoon's first "multiplex"; the theatre closed in the spring of 2000 and its space was used for temporary retail and other exhibitions before being reallocated to other stores and parking.

Another "day one" retailer was a franchise of the Dominion grocery store chain, which operated in the mall until the chain pulled out of Saskatoon in the late 1980s; after a few years of short-term uses (including housing its popular Eaton's-sponsored Christmas lights display), the mall redeveloped the former Dominion store into a food court.

The mall was originally one storey. By 1990, a second storey was added and the façade was altered to mimic the original 1900s railway station. This reconstruction cost CA$24 million. Soon after, Saskatoon's first (and, to date only) Toys "R" Us store opened on a standalone "big-box" location in 1992 on the mall's southern parking lot; although not physically connected to the mall, it is considered part of the shopping centre.

Also part of the Midtown complex is CN Towers – now "Midtown Tower" – an office block that was for most of the 1970s the tallest office building in Saskatoon. The 12-story tower is 57 m (187 ft) in height. From the early 1970s until the early 2000s, the fifth floor of the office block housed the studios of the local CBC Television owned-and-operated station CBKST. A small "boutique" mall, Midtown Village, was developed in the late 1970s at the corner of 20th Street and Idylwyld Drive; initially a separate development from Midtown Plaza, it briefly came under the same ownership as the larger mall in the 1990s and was branded as part of Midtown Plaza for a time, before being demolished for additional parking.

From 1993 to 2005, the mall owned and displayed a statue of Saskatchewan-born hockey player Gordie Howe at the southwest corner of 1st Avenue South and 20th Street East. It was relocated to the Credit Union Centre in 2005.

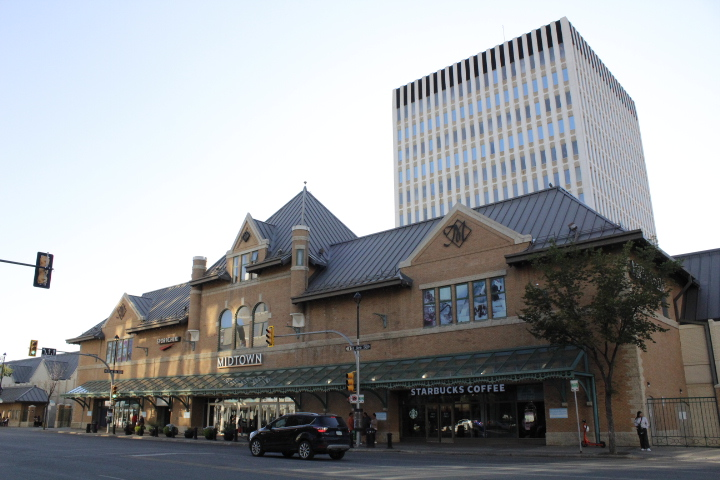

Following the closure of the Sears Canada chain in 2018, the mall began to redevelop the store's space into a new wing with a re-located food court known as Midtown Common, which opened on July 25, 2019. In November 2018, it was announced that the previous main-floor food court area would be redeveloped into an MEC, as its first location in the province. In December 2019, H&M announced that it would open a location at Midtown in 2020—its second in the province.

MEC was originally projected to open in May 2020, but was delayed to late-2021 due to the COVID-19 pandemic and other factors. The fate of the MEC store was questioned in September 2020, when MEC announced that it would be privatized and sold to American investment firm Kingswood Capital Management. As of summer 2025 the spot allocated for MEC remains vacant with no indication of being built. The new H&M store opened in December 2020. On June 1, 2025, Hudson’s Bay closed, as did all Hudson's Bay locations across Canada, leaving the mall with no large-format anchors (notwithstanding the standalone Toys R' Us). As of summer 2025 the mall had yet to announce its plans for the vacant Bay location.

== See also ==
- List of shopping malls in Saskatoon
