= Varsity View =

Varsity View may refer to:

- Varsity View, Saskatoon, a neighbourhood of Saskatoon, Saskatchewan, Canada
- Varsity View, Winnipeg, a neighbourhood of Winnipeg, Manitoba, Canada
- Varsity View Magazine, an American magazine based in Nebraska
