= Westmount, Saskatoon =

Westmount
- Neighbourhood
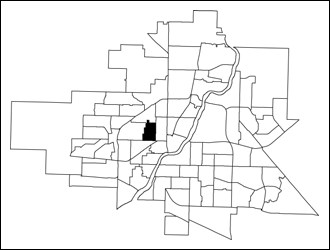
- Westmount location map
- Coordinates: 52°07′57″N 106°41′11″W
- Country: Canada
- Province: Saskatchewan
- City: Saskatoon
- Suburban Development Area: Core Neighbourhoods
- Neighbourhood: Westmount
- Settled: 1884
- Incorporated (as Saskatoon): 1906
- Construction: 1906–1960

Government
  - Type: Municipal (Ward 2)
  - Administrative body: Saskatoon City Council
  - Councillor: Senos Timon

Area
  - Total: 1.72 km^{2} (0.66 sq mi)

Population (2009)
  - Total: 2,232
  - Density: 1,300/km^{2} (3,360/sq mi)
  - Average Income: $44,729
- Time zone: UTC-6 (CST)
- Website: westmountcommunity.net

Westmount is an older inner city neighbourhood located near the centre of Saskatoon, Saskatchewan, Canada. It mostly consists of low-density, single detached dwellings. As of 2024, the area is home to 2,838 residents. The neighbourhood is considered a lower-income area, with an average family income of $44,729, an average dwelling value of $162,491 and a home ownership rate of 64.4%. According to MLS data, the average sale price of a home as of 2013 was $207,347.

== History ==
The area that now makes up Westmount was settled by homesteaders in 1884, as the east bank settlement of Saskatoon struggled for survival. A settler named Archibald L. Brown was one such landowner, owning a section of land where Westmount School would later be built. The neighbourhood was within the city limits when the City of Saskatoon incorporated in 1906. At that time it was the city's northwest corner, hence the name. The streets in Westmount are named for early settlers of the Saskatoon area, and most of the houses were built prior to 1960.

The neighbourhood appeared on a surveyors' map in 1911. The current boundaries of Westmount include some of an area called Ruskin Place, which appears on a 1913 map of registered subdivisions.

Westmount Community School was opened on April 3, 1913, now renamed Westmount School. It was designed by architect David Webster, who designed six of Saskatoon's Collegiate Gothic style elementary schools between 1910 and 1914. E. D. Feehan High School was opened in 1967, and named in honour of Edward Daniel Feehan, a former superintendent of separate schools in Saskatoon. It is designated a bilingual English and Ukrainian school, and also has classes in Cree and Spanish.

McMillan Avenue, which forms part of Westmount's western boundary, is named for Frank McMillan. He was a Toronto businessman who moved to Saskatoon, owned several successful businesses, and built several landmark buildings downtown. He would serve as Saskatoon's mayor and later a Member of Parliament.

Development prior to 1927 was haphazard, which sometimes resulted in irregularity between neighbourhood streets between Westmount and Caswell Hill. In 1927, the first formal town planning board was established. Westmount was zoned Residence A District, which limited development to one and two-family houses of no more than two-and-a-half storeys.

In its recent history, Westmount has become a lower-income inner city neighbourhood. It and other core neighbourhoods have been the recipients of affordable housing and community economic development initiatives to improve the lives of residents.

== Government and politics ==
Westmount exists within the federal electoral district of Saskatoon West. It is currently represented in the House of Commons by Brad Redekopp of the Conservative Party of Canada. He assumed office in 2019.

Provincially, the area is within the constituency of Saskatoon Centre. It is currently represented by Betty Nippi-Albright of the Saskatchewan New Democratic Party, elected in October 2024.

Municipally, Westmount exists within Ward 2, and is represented by City Councillor Senos Timon. He was elected in Saskatoon's most recent mayoral election on 13 November 2024.

== Institutions ==
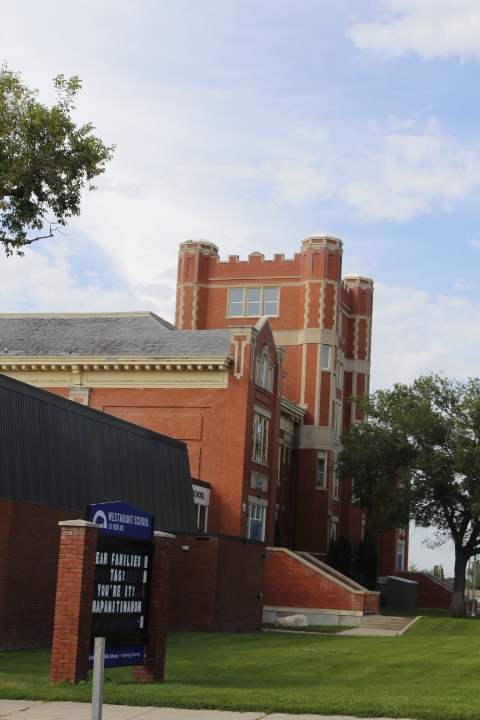
Westmount Community School

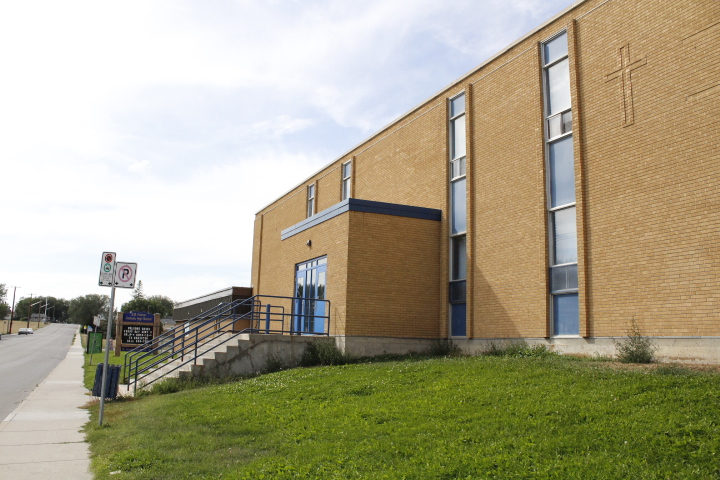
E.D. Feehan Catholic High School

=== Education ===
Westmount is serviced by four schools, including two within the neighbourhood and two in nearby communities.

- Westmount Community School is a public school operated by Saskatoon Public Schools which serves students from pre-kindergarten to grade eight. Built in 1912, it is one of Saskatoon's "castle schools", named for their Collegiate Gothic architecture.
- E. D. Feehan Catholic High School is a Catholic school operated by Greater Saskatoon Catholic Schools. It is free to attend and serves students from grades nine to twelve.

Outside of Westmount, in nearby communities, schools serve students who reside in Westmount:

- St. Maria Goretti Community School is a Catholic school operated by Greater Saskatoon Catholic Schools. It is located in neighbouring Mount Royal and services students in Westmount from pre-kindergarten to grade eight.
- Bedford Road Collegiate is a public high school operated by Saskatoon Public Schools. It is located in neighbouring Caswell Hill but borders Westmount via Rusholme Road. It services students from grades nine to twelve.

=== Public Transportation ===
Westmount is serviced by Saskatoon Transit, which operates multiple routes in the neighbourhood. These buses operate on major roads only, and do not cross residential streets. These routes include:

- High School Route 315, a weekdays-only route connecting secondary schools to major transit terminals.
- Route 3, which goes from Meadowgreen to Downtown Saskatoon bus terminal, crossing through Westmount on 29th Street West and again on Avenue H North.
- Route 5, which goes from the Confederation Mall terminal to the downtown terminal, crossing through Westmount via Rusholme Road.
- Route 60, which goes from the Confederation Mall terminal to the downtown terminal, crossing through Westmount via 22nd Street West.
- Route 65, which goes from Kensington to the downtown terminal, crossing through Westmount via 22nd Street West.

== Community and Culture ==
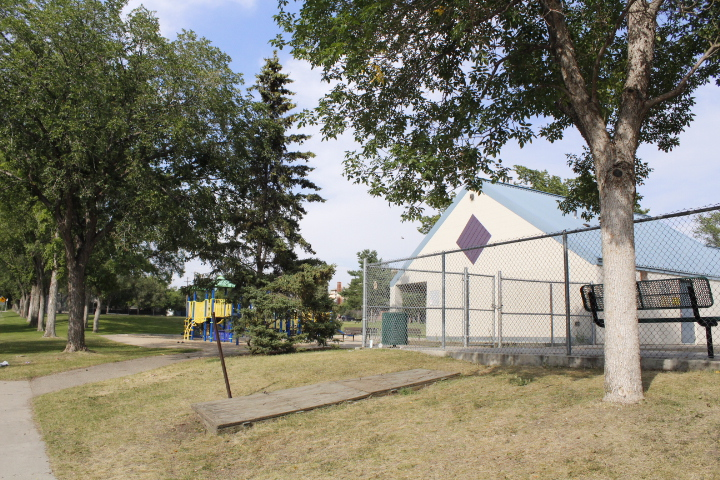
Westmount Park from the southwest entrance, featuring the paddling pool.

=== Recreation ===
Westmount is home to four parks:

- Westmount Park – 2.9 acres (1.2 ha)
- Pierre Radisson Park – 21.3 acres (8.6 ha)
- Leif Erickson Park – 13.2 acres (5.3 ha)
- Scott Park – 14.6 acres (5.9 ha)

Westmount Park offers a walking trail, playground, and paddling pool. Leif Erickson Park has a community garden with fifteen plots. This program is run by the Westmount Community Association.

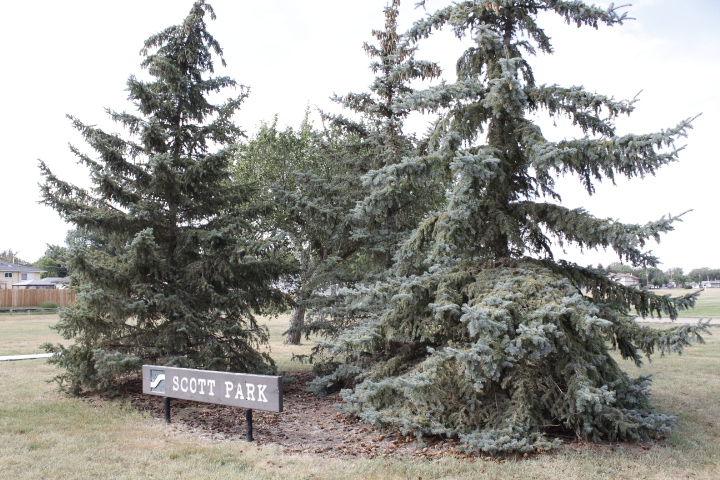
Scott Park

=== Community Association ===
The Westmount Community Association works to enhance the quality of life for its residents. It promotes and coordinates leisure programs and social activities, and provides a voice for the community on issues of local concern. A number of seasonal programs are offered at Westmount Community School, also the site of the outdoor rink. The Association coordinates events within the community, and works alongside community organisations from neighbouring Caswell Hill, Mayfair, and Mount Royal. Coordination and events are mostly communicated through Facebook.

== Commercial ==
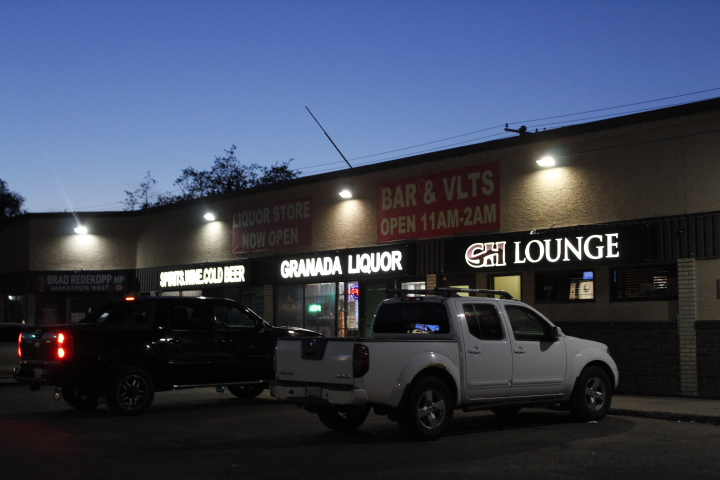
A commercial establishment on 22nd Street West in Westmount

Businesses in Westmount are almost exclusively located along 22nd Street West. 35 home-based businesses are also based in the neighbourhood. There are a variety of Fast-food restaurants as well as Liquor stores and used car dealerships on this street.

== Location ==
Westmount is located within the Core Neighbourhoods Suburban Development Area. It is bounded by 22nd Street to the south, Avenue H North to the east, 31st Street to the north and Avenue P North to the west. Roads are laid out in a grid fashion; streets run east-west, avenues run north-south.

== Demographics ==
As of 2024, there were 2,838 people residing in a total of 1047 dwellings in the neighbourhood. Homeownership was at 64.4%, with an average household size of 2.6. 50% of dwellings had been built before 1960, and 33% between 1961 and 2000. 17% of dwellings had been built after 2000.

Of adults in Westmount, 200 hold a post-secondary certificate or diploma from a college or university, 240 hold a Non-Accredited Degrees, 455 hold a high school diploma or equivalent as their highest form of education, and 275 have not completed high school. 32 adults were actively enrolled at the University of Saskatchewan, and 50 at Saskatchewan Polytechnic. In 2022, 253 students were enrolled in Westmount Community School (K-12), and 480 in E.D. Feehan Catholic High School (9-12). E.D. Feehan Catholic High School enrols students until the age of 21, therefore, adults ages 18-21 who were enrolled for the 2022-2023 academic year were enlisted as "enrolled" and not "No certificate" in the most recent census.

Economic Indicators Comparing Westmount With Saskatoon Overall
Measurement	Westmount	Saskatoon	Year	Change From Previous Measurement	Difference (Westmount/Saskatoon)
Median Personal Income (CAD)	$36,320	$43,200	2024	▲$3,160	Westmount scores 16.93% lower than Saskatoon's average
Labour Force Participation (%)	65.3	69.7	2021	▼0.5%	Westmount scores 6.31% lower than Saskatoon's average.
Economic Dependency Ratio (%)	34.5%	19.5%	2021	▲13.5%	Westmount scores 76.92% higher than Saskatoon's average.

Income Statistics Comparing Westmount With Saskatoon Overall
Income Bracket (CAD)	Westmount	Saskatoon	Change From Previous Measurement	Difference (Westmount/Saskatoon)
<$14,9999	16.6%	14.0%	▲4.3%	Westmount has 2.6% more of its population in this bracket compared to Saskatoon overall.
$15,000-$24,999	17.8%	13.5%	▲0.7%	Westmount has 4.3% more of its population in this bracket compared to Saskatoon overall.
$25,000-$34,999	15.9%	12.4%	▼0.7%	Westmount has 3.5% more of its population in this bracket compared to Saskatoon overall.
$35,000-$49,999	19.0%	16.6%	▼5.6%	Westmount has 2.4% more of its population in this bracket compared to Saskatoon overall.
$50,000-$74,999	20.9%	19.4%	▲0.7%	Westmount has 1.5% more of its population in this bracket compared to Saskatoon overall.
$75,000-$99,999	6.7%	11.5%	▼0.6%	Westmount has 4.8% less of its population in this bracket compared to Saskatoon overall.
>$100,000	3.1%	12.6%	None	Westmount has 9.5% less of its population in this bracket compared to Saskatoon overall.
