= Core Neighbourhoods Sector =

- Sector
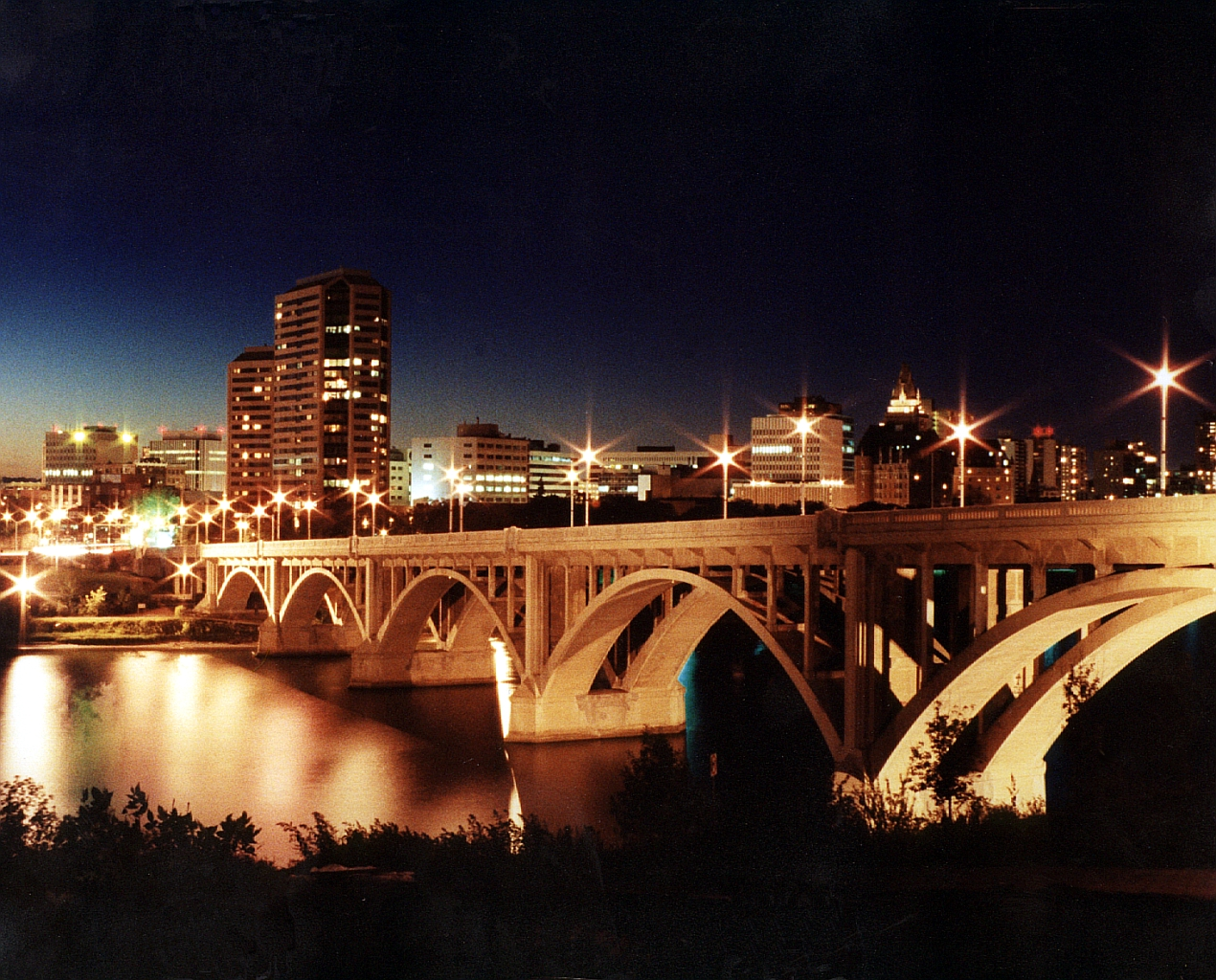
- Saskatoon Central Business District skyline at night
- Interactive map of Core Neighbourhoods Sector
- Country: Canada
- Province: Saskatchewan
- City: Saskatoon
- Area code: Area code 306

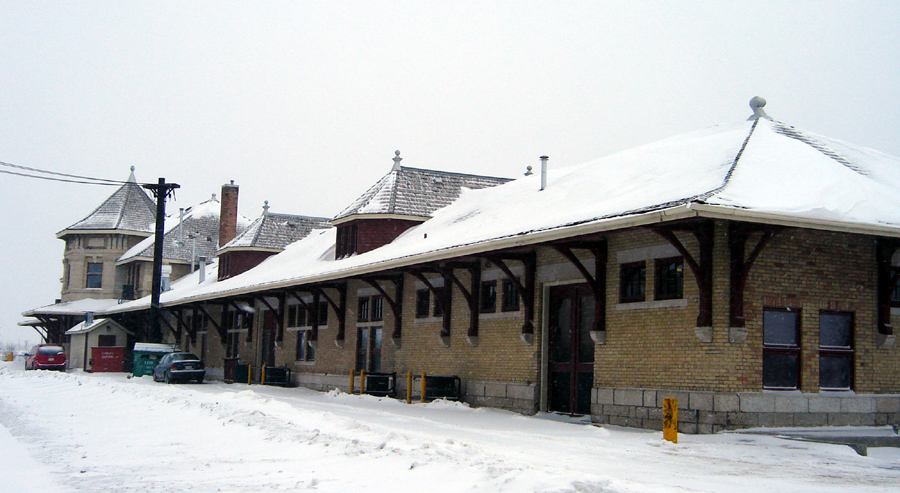
Canadian National Register Heritage Society Protected Sites Saskatoon Railway Station (Canadian Pacific) Caswell Hill

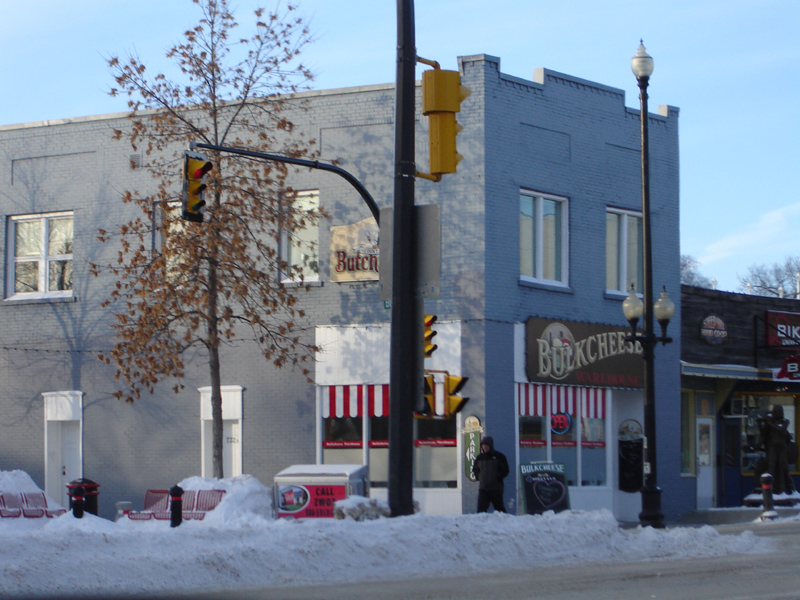
Municipal Heritage Site: Garrison House, Nutana

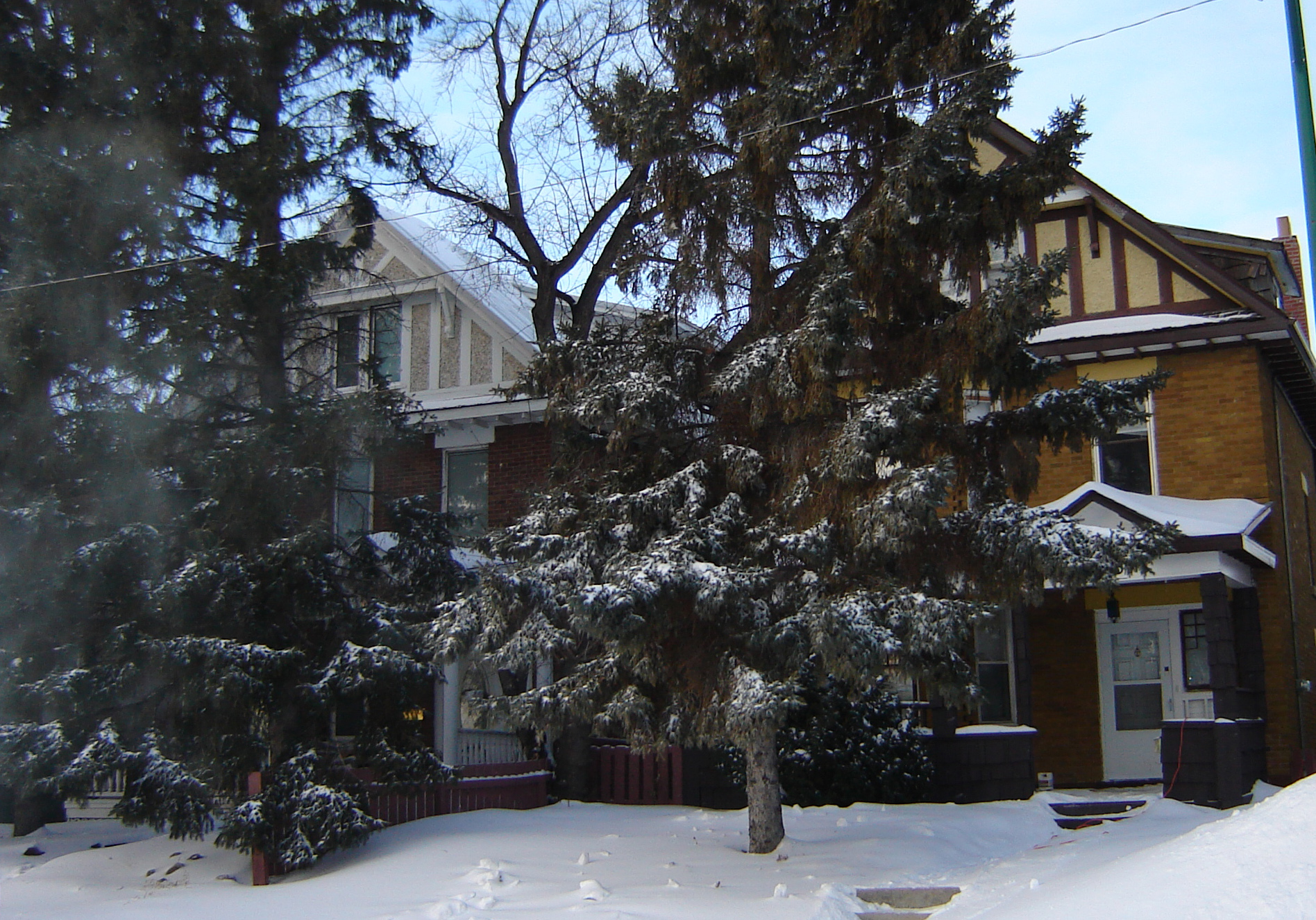
Heritage Site: Two Sisters Queen Elizabeth

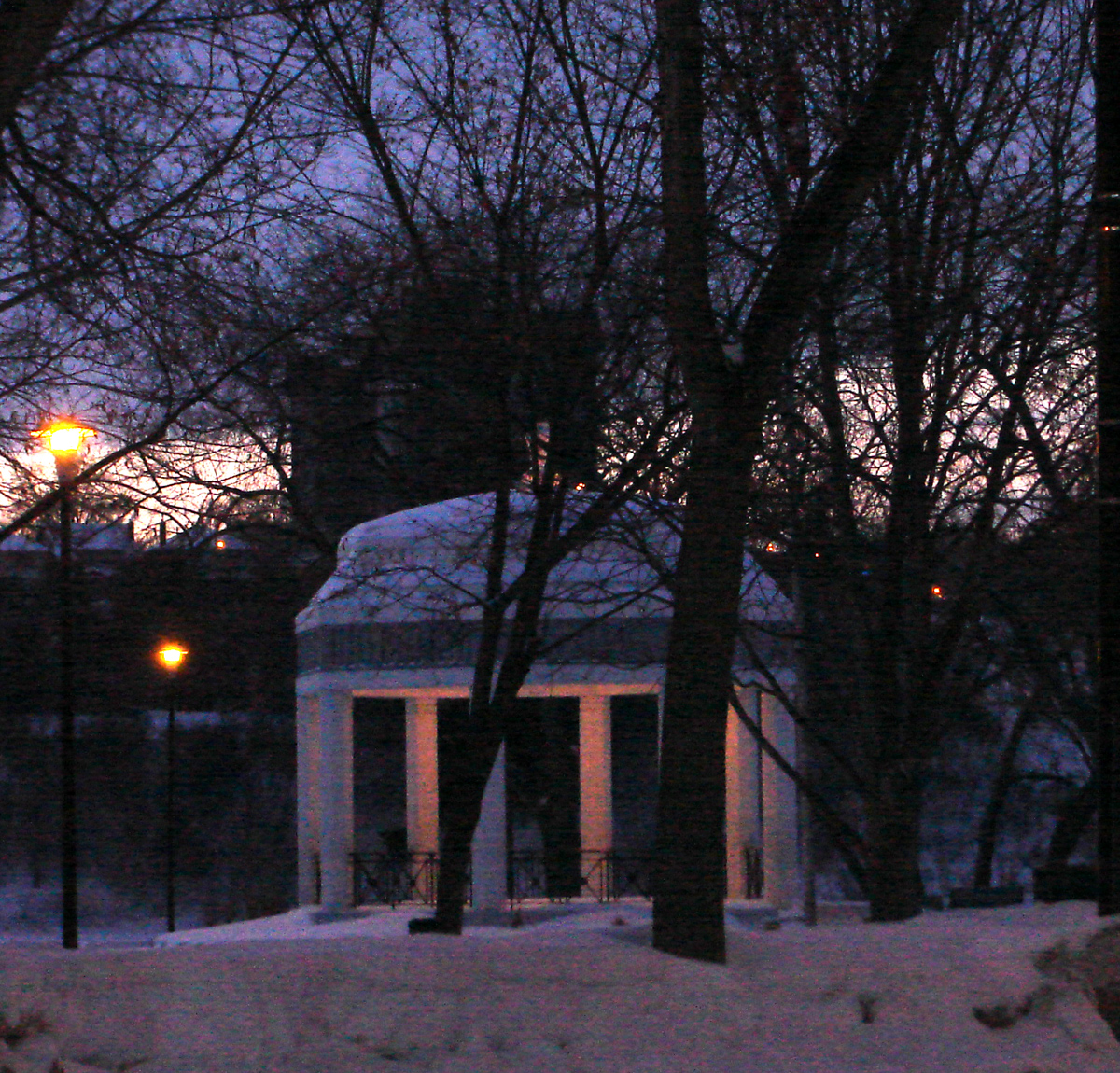
Heritage Site:Vimy Memorial Bandstand Central Business District

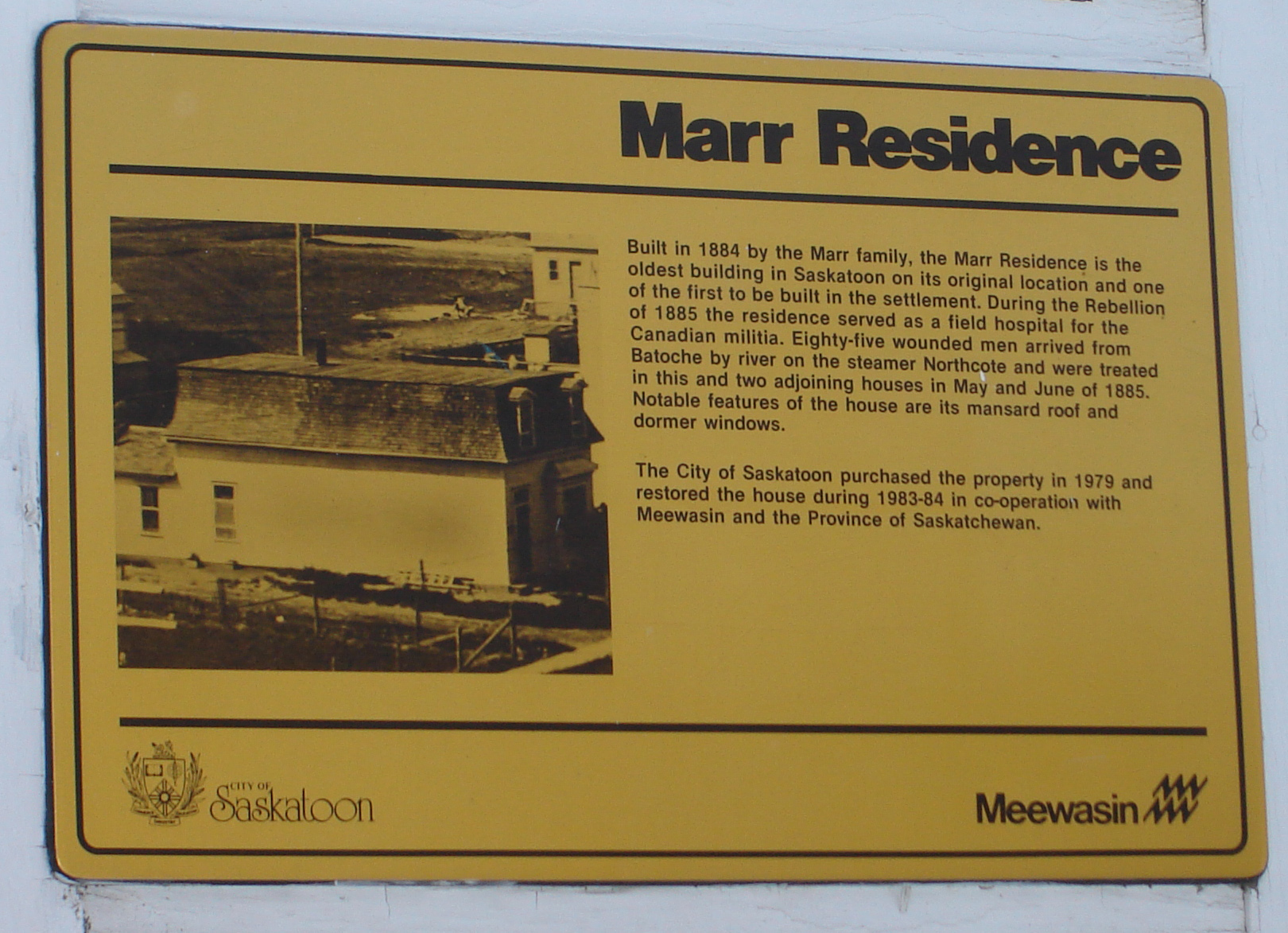
Municipal Heritage Site: Marr Residence Nutana

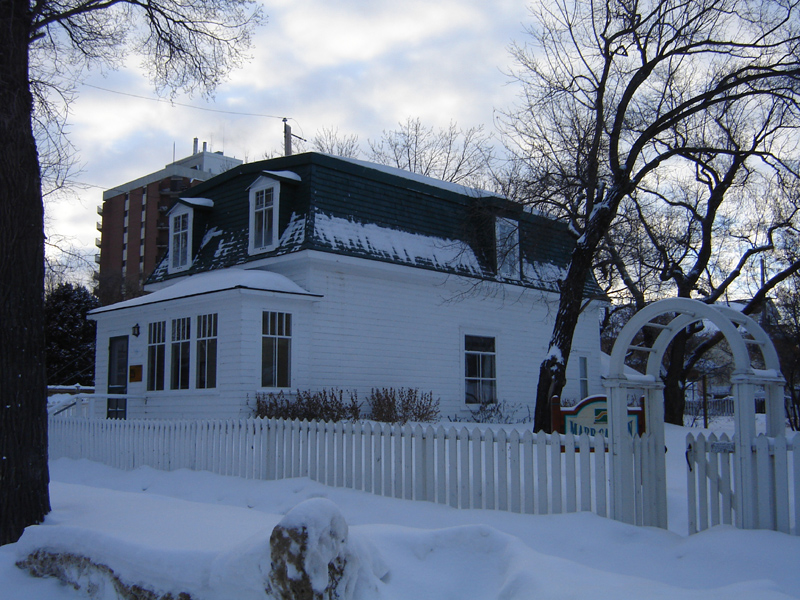
Heritage Site: Marr Residence Nutana

The Core Neighbourhoods Sector, previously known as the Core Neighbourhoods Suburban Development Area (SDA), is a sector in Saskatoon, Saskatchewan, Canada. It is a part of both the west and the east side communities of Saskatoon, straddling the South Saskatchewan River. On the west side it generally lies east and south of Confederation Sector and south of the Lawson Sector; while on the east side it lies south of the University Sector and east and north of the Nutana Sector. This sector comprises early Saskatoon origins where the first towns of Nutana, West Saskatoon, and Riversdale came together to form the city of Saskatoon in 1906.

== Neighbourhoods ==
=== East ===
The east side of the Core Neighbourhoods Sector brings together the early Temperance Society colony which became later known as Nutana and Varsity View. Nutana was the first settled area on the east side of the South Saskatchewan River. With the beginnings of the University of Saskatchewan, Varsity View saw rapid development.

=== West ===
With the coming of the rail line, the west side developed, forming a railway support neighborhood in Riversdale. The Central Business District was initially home to a residential community with the main churches lining the South Saskatchewan River. The warehouse district which supported the railway line, also supported a burgeoning retail sector as well. Residential areas soon blossomed north and west of the railway lines forming:

- Pleasant Hill
- Caswell Hill
- City Park
- King George
- Westmount

== Recreation Facilities ==
Some of the most beautiful and highly used parks are along the river bank in the Core Neighborhoods Sector. A children's playground, Ferris wheel, carousel, mini train, and splash pool are located within Kinsmen Park This area was initially the home a very early horse race track and then Saskatoon's first farm exhibitions. Kinsmen Park is home to many festivals, such as the Shakespeare on the Saskatchewan, Sasktel Saskatchewan Jazz Fest, Taste of Saskatchewan and Northern Saskatchewan International Children's Festival to name but a few. It formerly hosted the Louis Riel Relay Race, a part of Pion-era days a summer festival gathering.

Meewasin Park is a recently developed river bank trail and park area. The features now offer nature and historic information trail markers, benches, picnic tables, paved and wood chip trails and an interpretive centre.

The Mendel Art Gallery is home to changing art gallery displays, as well as a permanent collection of national repute.

Victoria Park features a children's play area, outdoor pool and water slide facility. It is also home to many Saskatoon riverbank festivals, such as the Dragon boat Races.

== Shopping ==
- Midtown Plaza
- Downtown Core
- 8th Street shopping district
- Broadway Avenue shopping district

== Education ==
Core Neighbourhoods Sector is home to the following schools:

=== Separate (Catholic) education ===
- Bishop Murray High School
- E.D. Feehan High School
- Oskāyak High School
- City Park Collegiate

==== Elementary schools ====
- St. Mary's Wellness and Education Centre

=== Public education ===
==== Secondary schools ====
- Bedford Road Collegiate
- Nutana Collegiate

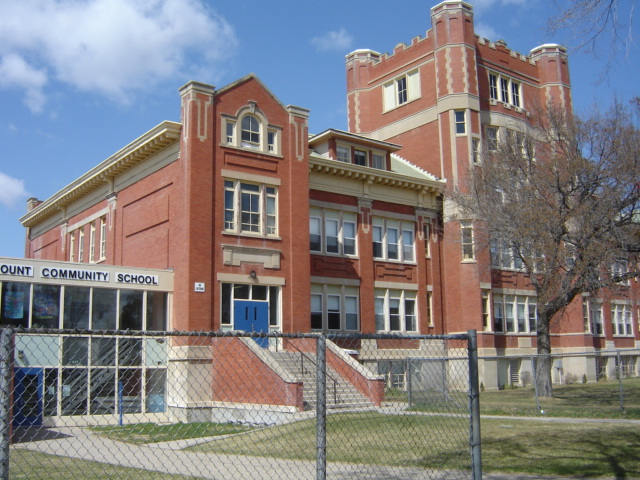
Westmount Public Elementary School

==== Elementary schools ====
- Brunskill School
- Caswell Community School
- King George School
- Pleasant Hill School
- Victoria School
- Westmount School

== Library ==
- Saskatoon Public Library – Frances Morrison (Main) Branch Library

== Transportation ==
- STC, The Saskatchewan Transportation Company

=== City transit ===
Saskatoon Transit downtown bus terminal receives most bus routes.
