= Pleasant Hill, Saskatoon =

Pleasant Hill
- Saskatoon Neighbourhood
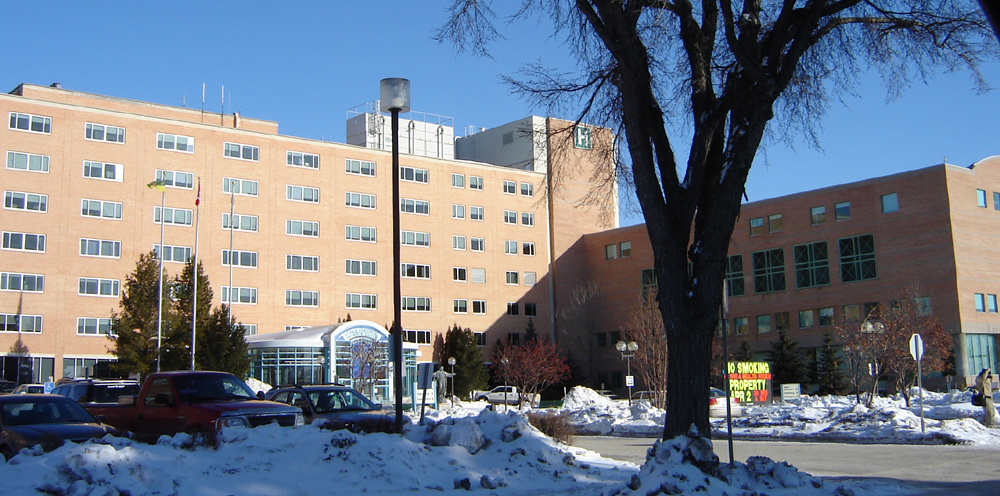
- St. Paul's Hospital
- Interactive map of Pleasant Hill
- Coordinates: 52°7′36″N 106°41′45″W
- Country: Canada
- Province: Saskatchewan
- City: Saskatoon
- Suburban Development Area: Core Neighbourhoods
- Neighbourhood: Riversdale
- Settled Willoughy Hill: 1885
- Incorporated (village): (as Pleasant Hill)
- Incorporated (city): 1906 (as Saskatoon)

Government
  - Type: Municipal (Ward 2)
  - Administrative body: Saskatoon City Council
  - Councillor: Senos Timon

Population (2025)
  - Total: 5,521
  - Median personal income: $42,400
- Time zone: UTC-6 (CST)
- Website: Pleasant Hill Community Association

Pleasant Hill is a residential neighbourhood located in the central-west part of Saskatoon, Saskatchewan, Canada. As of 2025, the area is home to 5,521 residents.

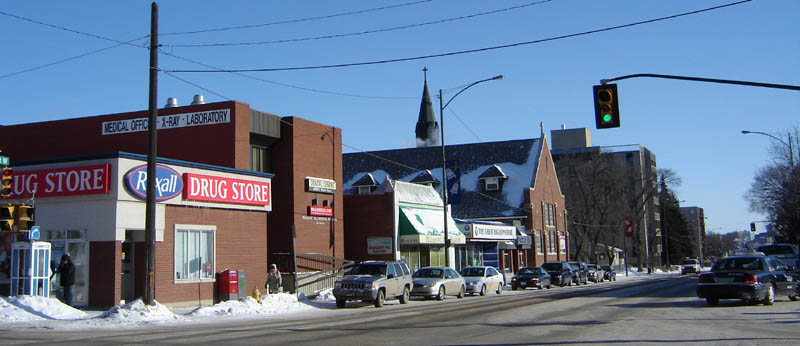
20th Street facing east towards downtown, St. Mary's Church location with steeple

== Layout ==
Within the Core Neighbourhoods Suburban Development Area (West Side), the neighbourhood of Pleasant Hill is triangular in shape and is south of 23rd Street, North-west of the rail line which runs diagonally and east of Avenue W South. Streets are laid out east and west, avenues are laid out running north and south. The whole of the Pleasant Hill community is laid out in a grid pattern.

== History ==
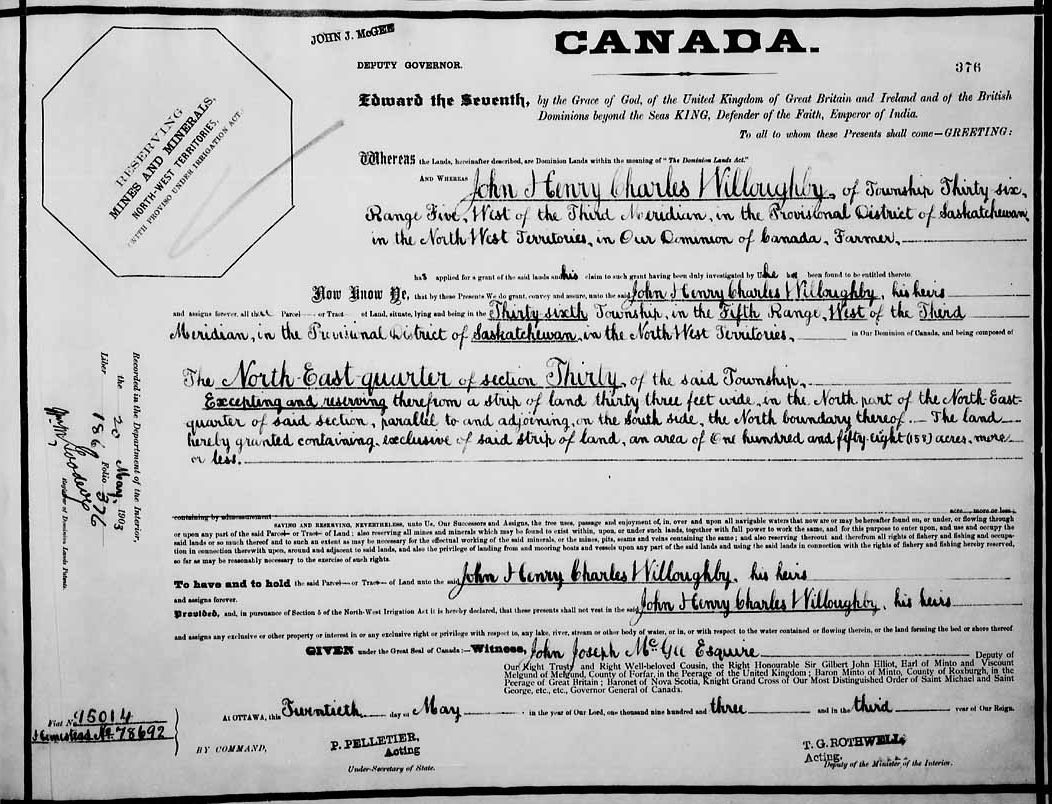
Dr. J.H.C. Willoughby Land Grant Patent showing he successfully proved up on his homestead.

The first name of the hill of this area was called Willoughby Hill.

From 1884 to 1890, Dr. J. H. C. Wiloughby was Saskatoon's first post master and first physician on the east side of the River until after providing medical assistance to Middleton's troops during the Riel Rebellion (Revolution). From 1885 to 1900 he departed to Regina. John Henry C. returned with his wife (Miss Hilliard) and homesteaded at Willoughby Hill. His homestead was Section 30 Township 36 Range 5 West of the 3rd Meridian, and his home was located at the present location of St. Paul's Hospital. Being that he was a physician, his home was one of the first hospitals of the City of Saskatoon. In 1903 he helped to establish the first telephone in the area. He also became one of Saskatoon's first city councillors from 1907–1908.

The boundaries of the Pleasant Hill community used to extend west of Avenue W to Circle Drive, but in the early 1990s the City of Saskatoon redrew many of its neighbourhood boundaries; as a result, the section west of Avenue W was renamed Meadowgreen.

During the 2010s, the federal and provincial governments undertook a major re-vitalization project of Pleasant Hill, with $3.5 million invested in the business and residential areas. Together with the Saskatoon Urban Renewal Project, the provincial government and the Western Economic Diversification project of the federal Government aimed to overhaul the neighbourhood. Several selected lots along 20th Street, Avenue N, and Avenue O were rezoned or demolished to make way for affordable homes and modern commercial upgrades.

As part of the re-vitalization project, the original St. Mary's School was demolished and replaced by the new St. Mary's Wellness and Education Centre, which opened in 2012. The new school includes several community amenities and services, including a medical clinic, daycare, optometry clinic, and an expanded pediatric clinic for kids. The school also includes a fully equipped gym and walking track, and a specially ventilated room for cultural activities.

== Demographics ==
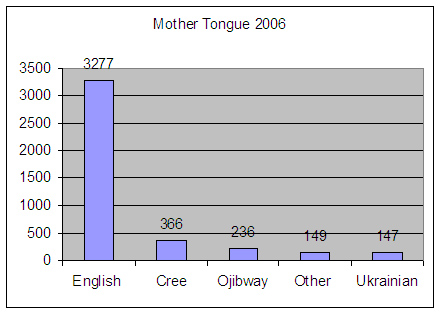
Mother tongue 2006

In 2025, there were 5,521 people living in the Pleasant Hill community area. The majority of homes in the Pleasant Hill Community are Multi Unit Dwellings. This area was first settled at the turn of the 20th century, the houses were generally built before 1908. Pleasant Hill has been a Vibrant Communities Partner since 2001 and benefits from various community developments by Quint Development Corporation and Children's Hunger and Education Project. In Pleasant Hill in 2025, the average household size was 2.2 and rate of homeownership was 58.0%, with average sale price of $170,258.

== Government and politics ==
Pleasant Hill exists within the federal electoral district of Saskatoon West. It is currently represented by Brad Redekopp of the Conservative Party of Canada, first elected in 2019.

Provincially, the area is divided by 20th Street into two constituencies. The southern portion lies within the constituency of Saskatoon Riversdale. It is currently represented by Kimberley Breckner of the Saskatchewan New Democratic Party (NDP), who was first elected in the 2024 Saskatchewan general election. The northern portion lies within the constituency of Saskatoon Centre. It is currently represented by Betty Nippi-Albright of the NDP, who was first elected in the 2020 Saskatchewan general election.

In Saskatoon's non-partisan municipal politics, Pleasant Hill lies within ward 2. It is currently represented by Senos Timon. He was elected in 2024 and is the first Black person to sit on Saskatoon City Council.

== Features ==
=== Protected properties ===
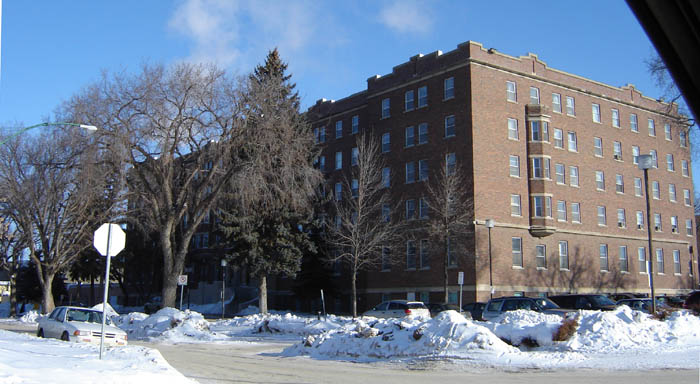
St. Paul's Hospital original nurses residence

- Ukrainian Catholic Cathedral of St. George located at 222 Avenue M South and built by architect the Very Reverend Philip Ruh, O.M.I. in 1923

=== Potential heritage properties ===
- Nurses Residence, St. Paul's Hospital
- Pleasant Hill School
- The Bosnia Club

== Education ==
St. Mary's Wellness and Education Centre
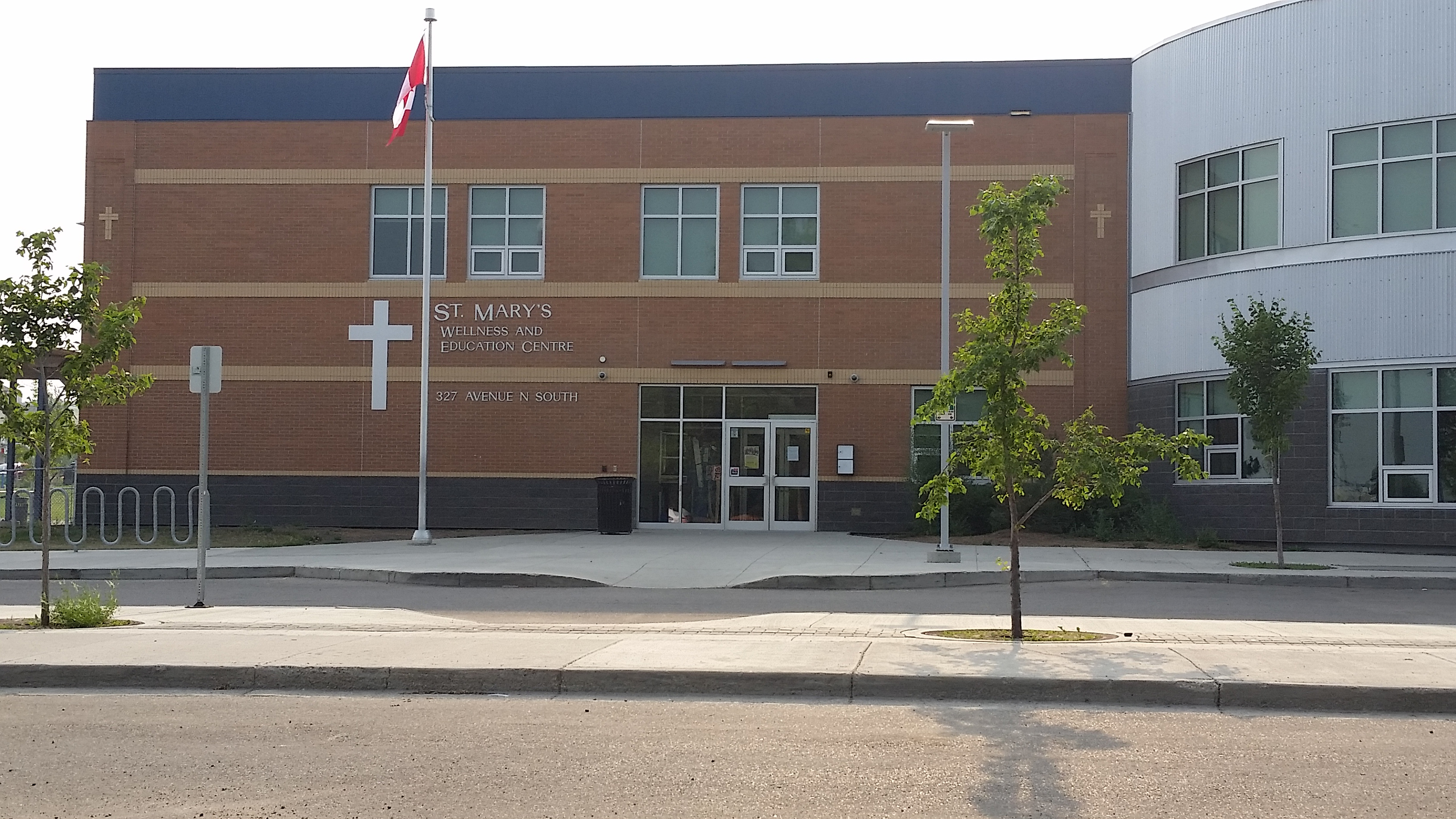

Location
- 327 Avenue N South; Saskatoon, Saskatchewan, S7M 2N2; Canada

Information
- Type: Elementary
- Religious affiliation: Catholic
- Established: 1913
- School board: Greater Saskatoon Catholic Schools
- Principal: Jesse Baptist
- Grades: Pre-Kindergarten to Grade 8
- Enrollment: 313 (2025)
- Education system: Separate
- Language: English
- Feeder to: E. D. Feehan High School
- Website: St. Mary's Wellness and Education Centre

- St. Mary's Wellness and Education Centre - separate (Catholic) elementary, part of Greater Saskatoon Catholic Schools

In March 2020, the provincial government committed to fund a new, centrally located K-8 school to serve the communities of King George, Pleasant Hill, and Riversdale. Planning began for a new city centre elementary school in nearby Riversdale, intended to replace the century-old King George and Pleasant Hill schools, as well as the 60-year-old Princess Alexandra school. Construction for the new school began in June 2025 on the site of the former Princess Alexandra School and is expected to open in 2027.

Pleasant Hill School was closed in June 2023 two years ahead of schedule after the provincial Ministry of SaskBuilds and Procurement purchased the property from Saskatoon Public Schools with intent to use it as a community facility. In January 2026, it was revealed the former Pleasant Hill School will be renovated and converted into a wellness clinic by Ahtahkakoop Cree Nation. The site redevelopment project will involve refurbishing the existing school along with construction of a new urgent care centre and three-story parking garage.

== Public services ==
Saskatoon Light and Power provides electrical utilities to all Saskatoon neighbourhoods which existed prior to 1958. Water is treated and supplied by the City of Saskatoon Water and Wastewater Treatment Branch. St. Paul's Hospital is located in Pleasant Hill, Royal University Hospital is located in the University of Saskatchewan Land Management area, and Saskatoon City Hospital is located in City Park. The Saskatoon Police Service Headquarters location is within the Central Business District located at 130 4th Avenue North. The Central Division oversees the Central Business District, the Riversdale Business District, SIAST and nine other residential areas. Pleasant Hill is served by the City of Saskatoon Saskatoon Fire & Protective Services, Fire Hall number 1 and head office is located at 125 Idylwyld Drive South, Riversdale.

== Parks and recreation ==
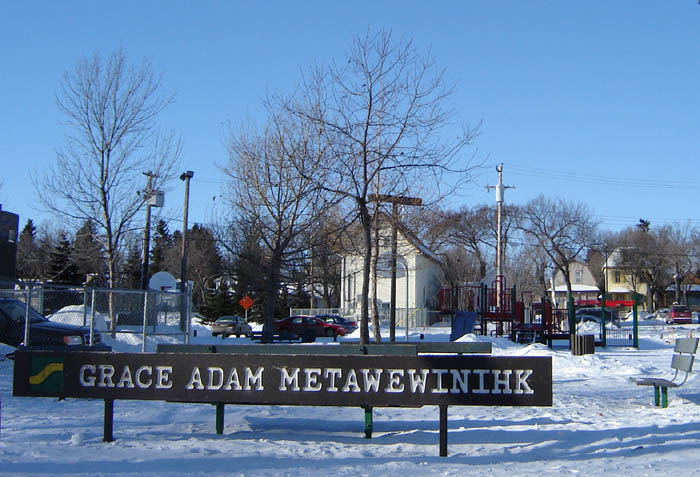
Grace Adam Metawewinihk Park

- D.L. Hamilton Park – 1.63 acres (6,600 m^{2})
- Fred Mendel Park – 12.63 acres (51,100 m^{2})
- Pleasant Hill Rec. Unit – 2.94 acres (11,900 m^{2})
- St. George's Park – 0.93 acres (3,800 m^{2})
- Grace Adam Metawewinihk Park – 1.02 acres (4,100 m^{2})
- Pleasant Hill Spray Paddling Pool

== Area religion ==
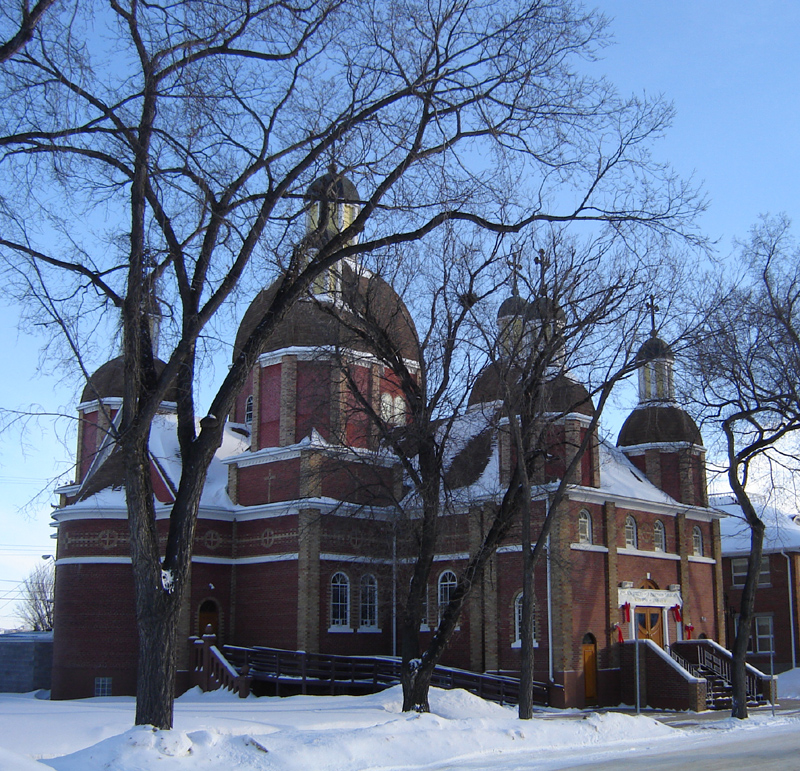
St. George's Ukrainian Catholic Cathedral

- Saskatoon Dawah Center
- St. Mary's Church
- St.George's Church and St. George's Hall.

== Transportation ==
=== City transit ===
Pleasant Hill is serviced by the Saskatoon Transit bus routes #1, #2, #50 and #60. Route #5 also runs along Rusholme Road, a block north of the neighbourhood boundary.

22nd Street (Highway 14) is a major thoroughfare through Saskatoon. Highway 7 has its junction at (Highway 14. Highway 14 connects with Asquith, Biggar Wilkie, Unity, and Macklin en route to Alberta.

== Life ==
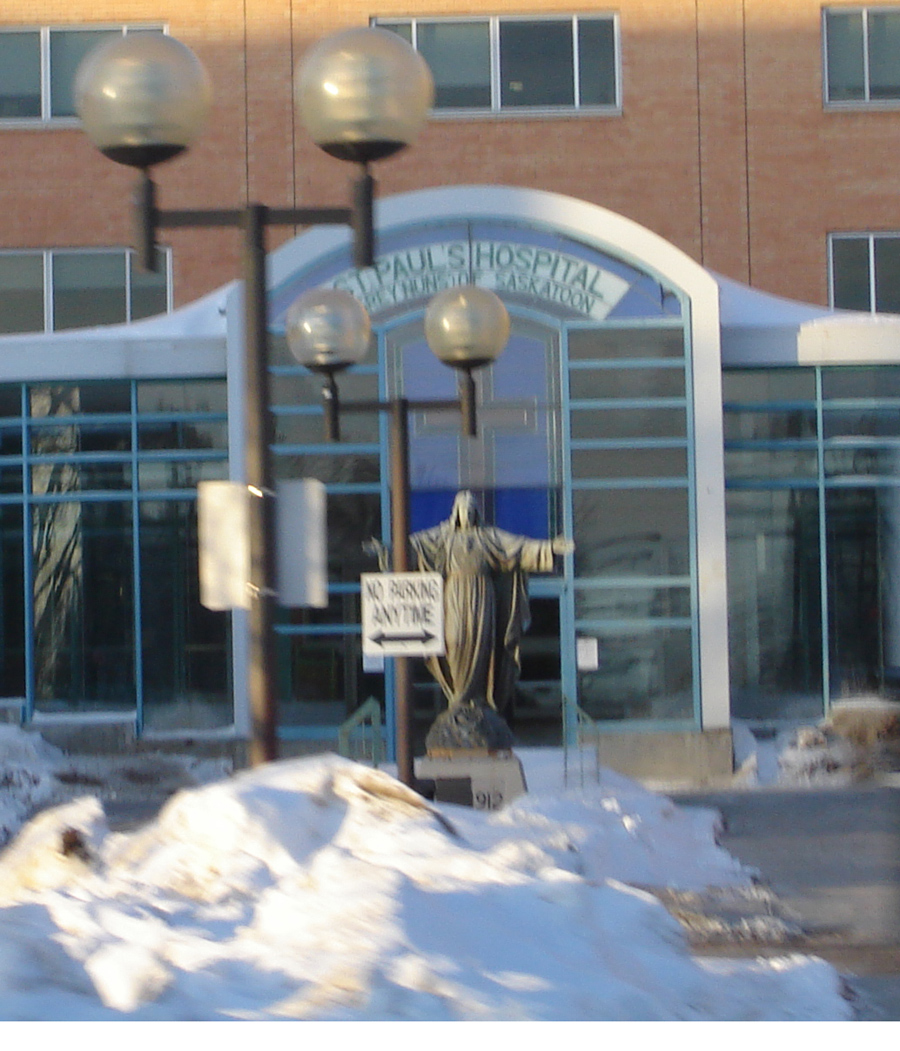
St. Paul's Hospital

Pleasant Hill Community Association provides leisure activities for various age groups and operates out of both Pleasant Hill School and St. Mary School.

Saskatchewan Music Educators has introduced drum circles entitled Circles of Peace in various schools, of which the Pleasant Hill Community School is one.
