= King George, Saskatoon =

King George
- Neighbourhood
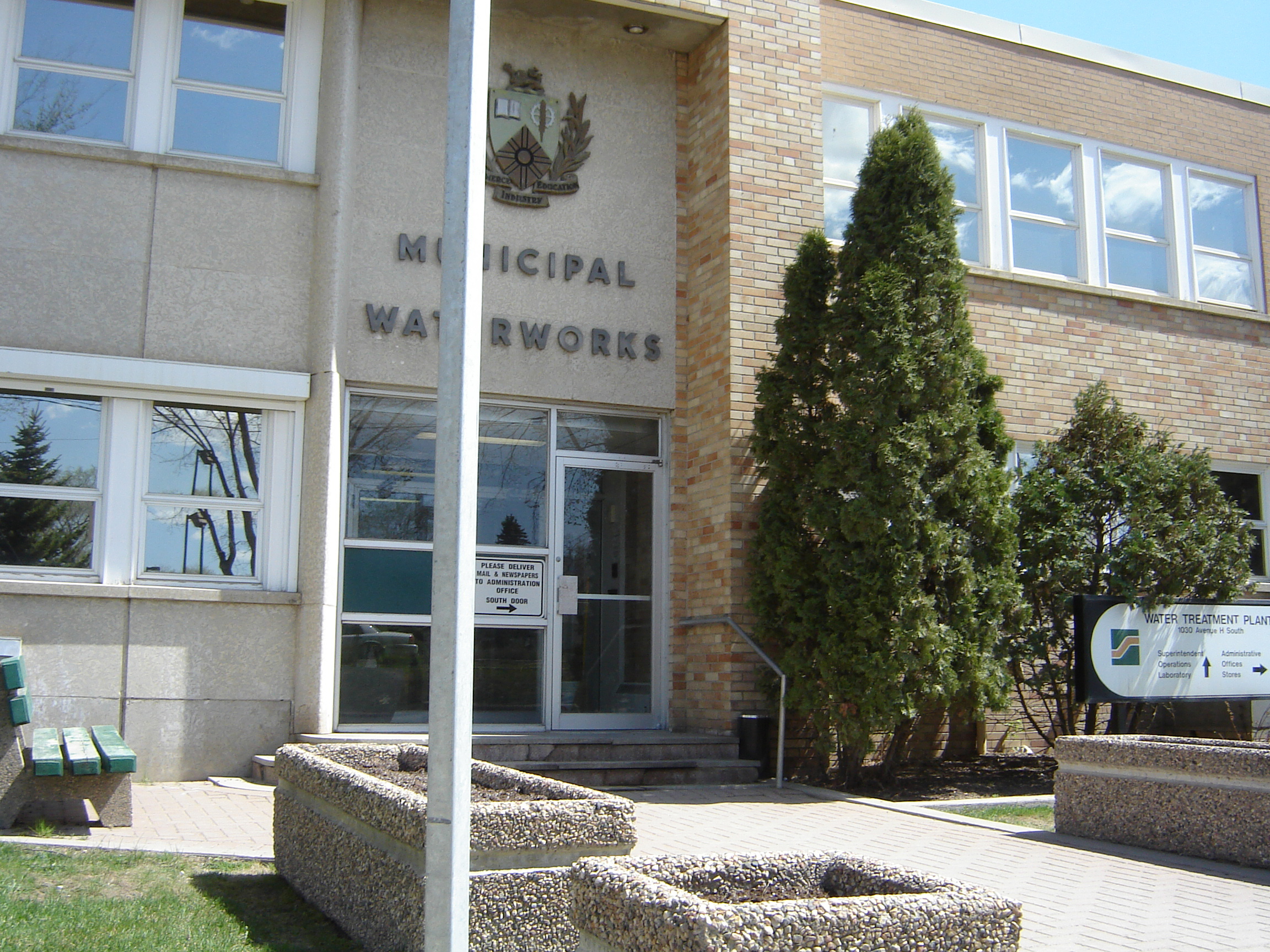
- Municipal water treatment plant

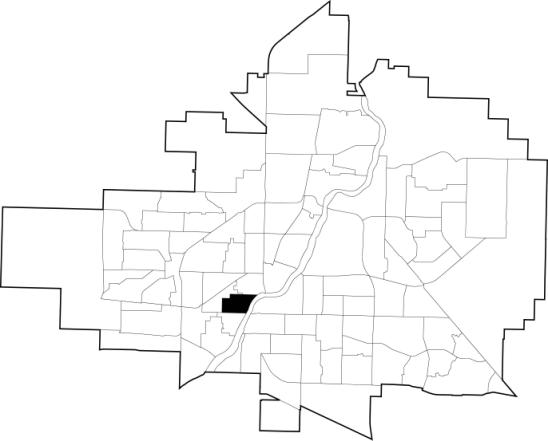
- King George location map
- Coordinates: 52°7′9″N 106°41′12″W
- Country: Canada
- Province: Saskatchewan
- City: Saskatoon
- Suburban Development Area: Core Neighbourhoods
- Neighbourhood: King George
- Surveyed: 1907
- Construction: 1907-1960

Government
  - Type: Municipal (Ward 2)
  - Administrative body: Saskatoon City Council
  - Councillor: Senos Timon

Area
  - Total: 0.83 km^{2} (0.32 sq mi)

Population (2011)
  - Total: 1,902
  - Density: 2,300/km^{2} (5,900/sq mi)
  - Average Income: $36,345
- Time zone: UTC-6 (CST)
- Website: King George Community Association

King George is an older inner city neighbourhood located near the centre of Saskatoon, Saskatchewan, Canada. It consists mostly of low-density, single detached dwellings. As of 2011, the area is home to 1,902 residents. The neighbourhood is considered a lower-income area with an average family income of $47,581, an average dwelling value of $146,941 and a home ownership rate of 69.1%.

== History ==
A buffalo kill site was found in the King George area, documenting its history back 6000 years. In modern times, the neighbourhood was surveyed in 1907 and originally named Riverview. After the arrival of the Barr Colonists in 1903, the land now referred to as Victoria Park (named after Queen Victoria) was sold to settler and entrepreneur, Frank Butler. Shortly thereafter, the land was subdivided and housing constructed despite an earlier plan that identified the riverbank be reserved for public use. When the City of Saskatoon acquired the land for recreational park purposes, all of the Butler subdivision (with the exception of the gardener's residence) was removed.

In 1911, the Public School Board decided to relocate Prince of Wales School to the present site of King George School at 721 Avenue K South. In 1912 the name of the school was changed to honour King George V. Around 1929 the neighbourhood was renamed to incorporate the name of the new public school, and the boundary was redrawn to include the west portion of Spadina Crescent, along Victoria Park. The new boundaries also enclosed an area called Andrews Addition, identified on a 1913 map of registered subdivisions.

Saskatoon's Municipal Swimming Pool (now Riversdale Pool) on Avenue H in Victoria Park opened on July 15, 1925, replacing the "swimming hole" cordoned off at the river's edge. Filtration and chlorination systems were primitive, and the pool was quickly dubbed the "Avenue Itch" pool. Despite having "its own peculiar smell, which was obvious for blocks," the pool was hugely popular with the people of Saskatoon. During the Great Depression, admission was "five cents if you had it, free if you didn't".

The housing stock in King George was mostly built before 1960, with a slight majority being constructed prior to World War II. In 1980, the Saskatoon Public School Board designated King George as an Interagency Community School, being one of the first in the province to receive that designation.

King George has struggled in its recent history, with a portion of the population living below the poverty line. The social ills that accompany poverty - substance abuse, violent crime and dilapidated housing - have often cast the area in a negative light. The municipal government and community groups are working to improve the neighbourhood and the lives of its residents.

== Government and politics ==
King George exists within the federal electoral district of Saskatoon West. It is currently represented by Brad Redekopp of the Conservative Party of Canada, first elected in 2019.

Provincially, the area is within the constituency of Saskatoon Riversdale. It is currently represented by Marv Friesen of the Saskatchewan Party, first elected in 2020.

In Saskatoon's non-partisan municipal politics, King George lies within ward 2. It is currently represented by Senos Timon, first elected in 2024.

== Institutions ==
=== Education ===
King George Community School
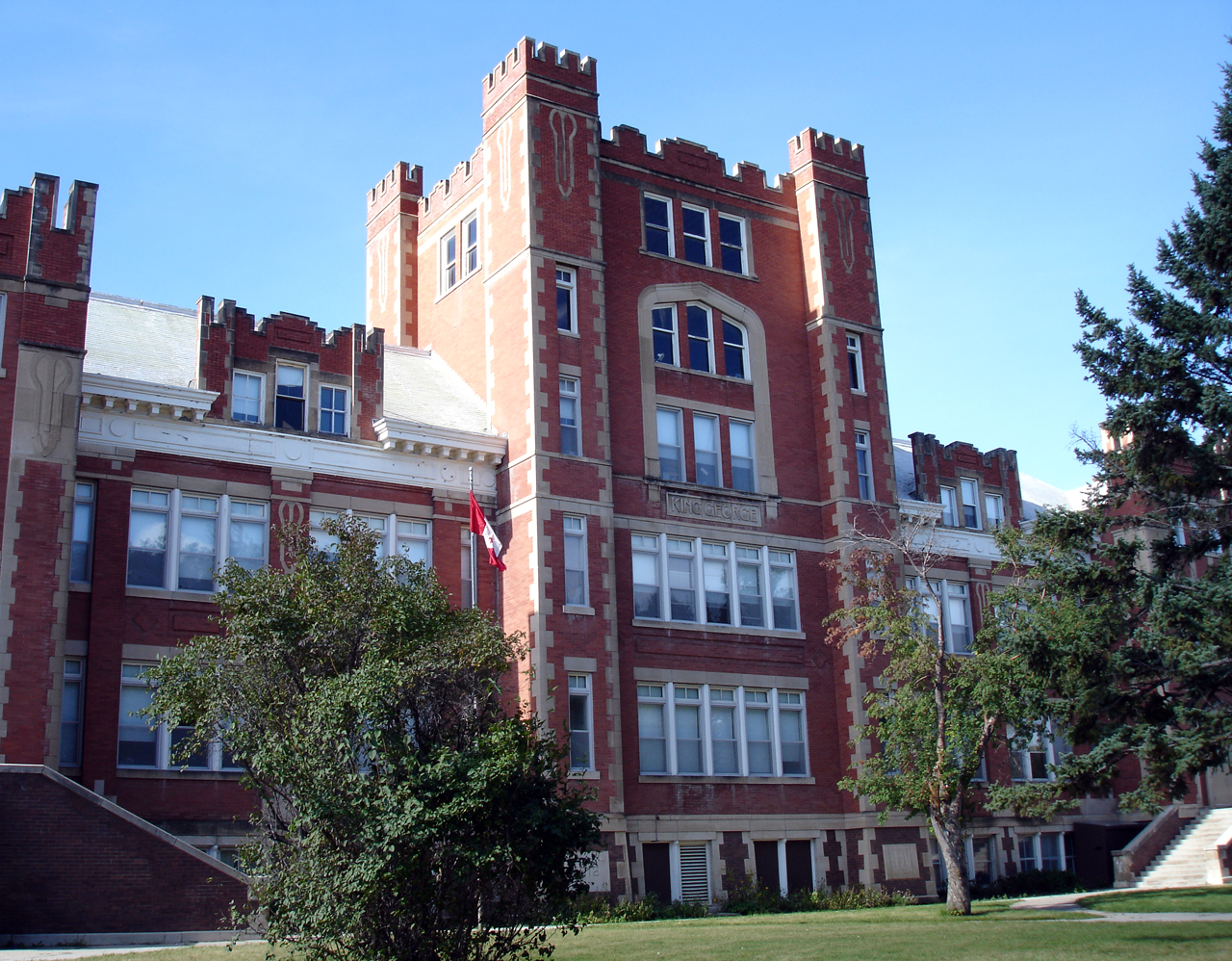
- 721 Avenue K South; Saskatoon, Saskatchewan, S7M 2E7; Canada

Information
- Type: Elementary
- Opened: 1912
- School board: Saskatoon Public Schools
- Principal: Julienne Buckle
- Grades: Kindergarten to Grade 8
- Enrollment: 101 (2017)
- Education system: Public
- Language: English
- Feeder to: Bedford Road Collegiate
- Website: King George Community School

- King George School - public elementary, part of the Saskatoon Public School Division. This school was built in 1912 from a design by David Webster, and constructed with Estevan brick with stone trim. The Masonic symbols on the façade are typical of Webster's designs. Plans called for a domestic science room on the upper floor, quarters for the caretaker, and a dining room. The final cost of construction was $156,210.

=== Other ===
- Royal Canadian Legion Chapter 63 - This branch of the Royal Canadian Legion was originally located in downtown Saskatoon. It relocated to the Pensioners and Pioneers Pavilion on Spadina Crescent West in 2007, when the Legion Hall on 19th Street was sold and demolished as part of the River Landing development.
- Water Treatment Plant - Originally built in 1906 as a power plant, a filter plant for water services was added in 1911. Two unique features of the Plant include a geodesic dome built in 1988 to cover one of the clarifiers used in the water treatment process, and the reuse of the old Bay walkway that spanned 2nd Avenue between the former Bay building and its adjacent parking lot.

== Parks and recreation ==
- St. Andrews Park (2.3 acres)
- Victoria Park (38.8 acres) - named for Queen Victoria, this public park houses many facilities. While most of the park is in King George, a small portion of the park lies within the Riversdale neighbourhood. The facilities in the park include:

- Riverside Lawn Bowling Club - Lawn bowling club that operates from April to October.
- Riverside Badminton and Tennis Club - Members-only tennis club with both indoor and outdoor courts.
- Lions Skatepark - Skateboard park opened in 2003 with 20,000 square feet (1,900 m^{2}) of space.
- Riversdale Pool - Features a 180 ft (55 m) waterslide, zero depth water for toddlers, diving boards, playground, volleyball court, basketball, lawn area with electric barbecue and concession.
- Boat house and launch - Owned by the city, its tenants are the Saskatoon Rowing Club, Saskatoon Racing Canoe Club, Saskatoon Canoe Club, and Saskatoon Nordic Ski Club.

The King George Community and School Association was created to promote a positive image of the neighbourhood and assist in the development of the cultural, educational, recreational, and social well-being of residents.

== Commercial ==
Only a few businesses are located in King George, on Avenue P and Avenue H. 33 home-based businesses are based in the neighbourhood.

== Transportation ==
King George is served by Saskatoon Transit bus route #9.

== Location ==
King George is located within the Core Neighbourhoods Suburban Development Area. It is bounded by 11th Street to the south, Avenue P to the west and the South Saskatchewan River to the east. The northern boundary starts at South Saskatchewan River and follows west down 17th Street; it then runs down the easement between Avenues M and N until 16th Street; finally, it follows 16th Street to Avenue P. Roads are laid out in a grid fashion; streets run east-west, avenues run north-south.

== See also ==
- Royal eponyms in Canada
