= Bedford Road Invitational Tournament =

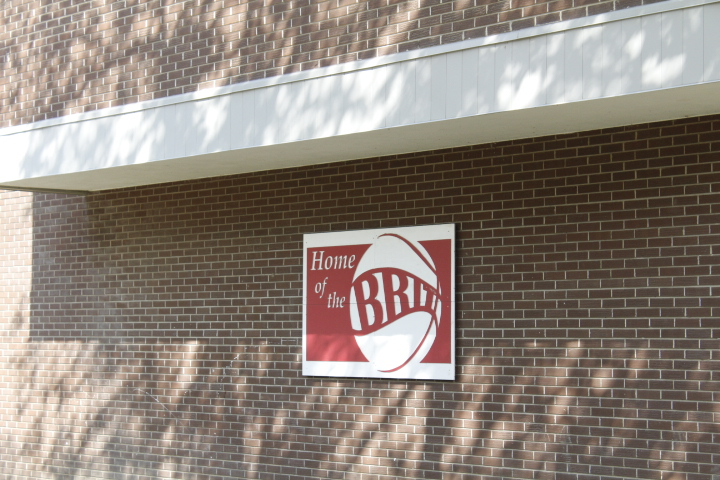

Tournament information
- Sport: Basketball
- Location: Saskatoon
- Month played: February
- Established: 1968
- Host: Bedford Road Collegiate - SPS
- Venue: Kelly Bowers Gymnasium
- Champions: (55th title)

Current champion
- St. Francis Xavier High School

The Bedford Road Invitational Tournament (BRIT) is a boy's high school basketball tournaments in Canada. It takes place every January at Bedford Road Collegiate in Saskatoon, Saskatchewan. The current format has 12 schools take part in the tournament. Some notable alumni of BRIT include Martin Riley, Brent Charleton, Karl Tilleman, John Hatch, Byron Tokarchuk, Eric Mobley, and Robert Sacre.

== History ==
The Bedford Road Invitational Tournament, held annually at Bedford Road Collegiate in Saskatoon, Saskatchewan, is one of Canada's most prestigious high school basketball tournaments. Founded in 1968, BRIT originally featured only local Saskatoon high schools before expanding to include teams from across Saskatchewan and beyond.

=== Expansion and national reach ===
In 1969, schools from Regina and Weyburn were invited, turning the tournament into a province-wide event. By 1972, out-of-province teams such as Sisler High School from Winnipeg and Calgary's E.P. Scarlett began competing, marking BRIT's transformation into a national tournament.

In 1975, the tournament moved from December to its now-traditional January slot. Over the late 1970s and early 1980s, teams from British Columbia, Ontario, and Quebec began participating regularly.

=== International participation ===
The first non-Canadian team to participate in BRIT were the New York Gauchos in 1988. The Gauchos were an Amateur Athletic Union club team of students from various high schools rather than a school team, and they dominated the tournament, winning easily. The Castle Hill Kings, also from New York City, participated in 1993.

The first non-North American team, The Scots College from Sydney, Australia, played in the 2004 tournament. They returned for the 2007, 2012, and 2015 tournaments.

=== Recent developments ===
The tournament was cancelled for the first time in 2021 due to the COVID-19 pandemic. The 2022 tournament was cancelled for the same reason. The tournament resumed in 2023. In 2024 the Walter Murray Marauders won the BRIT54 Championship, defeating city rivals Holy Cross in only the third all-Saskatoon final.

== Champions ==
Year	School	City	Province
1968	Bedford Road Collegiate	Saskatoon	Saskatchewan
1969	Sheldon-Williams Collegiate	Regina	Saskatchewan
1970	Sheldon-Williams Collegiate	Regina	Saskatchewan
1971	Mount Royal Collegiate	Saskatoon	Saskatchewan
1972	Sisler High School	Winnipeg	Manitoba
1973	Sheldon-Williams Collegiate	Regina	Saskatchewan
1975	Sheldon-Williams Collegiate	Regina	Saskatchewan
1976	Sheldon-Williams Collegiate	Regina	Saskatchewan
1977	Burnaby South Secondary School	Burnaby	British Columbia
1978	Sir Winston Churchill High School	Calgary	Alberta
1979	Mennonite Educational Institute	Clearbrook	British Columbia
1980	Mennonite Educational Institute	Clearbrook	British Columbia
1981	Bell High School	Ottawa	Ontario
1982	Bell High School	Ottawa	Ontario
1983	St. Pius X High School	Ottawa	Ontario
1984	Dr. E.P. Scarlett High School	Calgary	Alberta
1985	M.E. LaZerte High School	Edmonton	Alberta
1986	M.E. LaZerte High School	Edmonton	Alberta
1987	Kelvin High School	Winnipeg	Manitoba
1988	New York Gauchos (an Amateur Athletic Union club rather than a high school team)	New York	New York
1989	Windsor Park Collegiate	Winnipeg	Manitoba
1990	Walter Murray Collegiate	Saskatoon	Saskatchewan
1991	Harry Ainlay Composite High School	Edmonton	Alberta
1992	Harry Ainlay Composite High School	Edmonton	Alberta
1993	Nepean High School	Ottawa	Ontario
1994	Pitt Meadows Secondary School	Pitt Meadows	British Columbia
1995	Bishop Carroll High School	Calgary	Alberta
1996	M.E. LaZerte High School	Edmonton	Alberta
1997	Holy Cross High School	Saskatoon	Saskatchewan
1998	Carson Graham Secondary School	North Vancouver	British Columbia
1999	Balfour Collegiate	Regina	Saskatchewan
2000	Ross Sheppard High School	Edmonton	Alberta
2001	Ross Sheppard High School	Edmonton	Alberta
2002	Lester B. Pearson High School	Calgary	Alberta
2003	Holy Cross High School	Saskatoon	Saskatchewan
2004	Holy Cross High School	Saskatoon	Saskatchewan
2005	Handsworth Secondary School	North Vancouver	British Columbia
2006	Handsworth Secondary School	North Vancouver	British Columbia
2007	Handsworth Secondary School	North Vancouver	British Columbia
2008	Vancouver College	Vancouver	British Columbia
2009	Vancouver College	Vancouver	British Columbia
2010	Pitt Meadows Secondary School	Pitt Meadows	British Columbia
2011	St. George's School	Vancouver	British Columbia
2012	The Scots College	Sydney	New South Wales
2013	Calgary Sir Winston Churchill	Calgary	Alberta
2014	Dr. Martin LeBoldus High School	Regina	Saskatchewan
2015	Dr. Martin LeBoldus High School	Regina	Saskatchewan
2016	Archbishop O'Leary Catholic High School	Edmonton	Alberta
2017	St. Francis Xavier High School	Edmonton	Alberta
2018	Handsworth Secondary School	North Vancouver	British Columbia
2019	Bishop McNally High School	Calgary	Alberta
2020	Handsworth Secondary School	North Vancouver	British Columbia
2021	Cancelled due to COVID-19		
2022	Cancelled due to COVID-19		
2023	Raymond High School	Raymond	Alberta
2024	Walter Murray Collegiate	Saskatoon	Saskatchewan
2025	St. Francis Xavier High School	Edmonton	Alberta
2026	Magrath High School	Magrath	Alberta
