= Albert Community Centre =

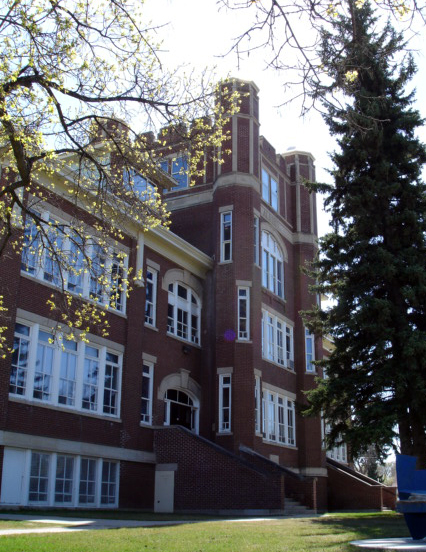
- Interactive map of the Albert Community Centre area

General information
- Architectural style: Collegiate Gothic
- Location: 610 Clarence Avenue South, Saskatoon, Saskatchewan, Canada
- Coordinates: 52°7′9.52″N 106°38′45.24″W
- Construction started: 1911
- Completed: 1911
- Client: Saskatoon Public School Board

Design and construction
- Architect: David Webster

The Albert Community Centre (built in 1911) is a designated Municipal Heritage Property located in the Varsity View, neighborhood of Saskatoon, Saskatchewan, Canada. Originally built as the Albert School, the 2 1/2-storey brick building served as a public school until 1978 when the building was sold to the city and became the Albert Community Centre. The school was originally named for Prince Albert, Queen Victoria's Consort. The most noticeable feature of the building include limestone trim, crenellated tower, crossed mullioned windows, dormers and curved parapet gables.

== See also ==
- Royal eponyms in Canada
