= Bedford Road Collegiate =

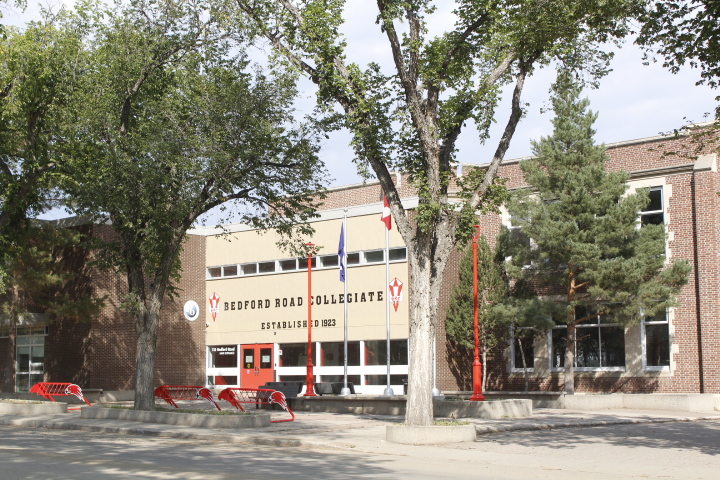
- Front of the school

Location
- 722 Bedford Road; Saskatoon, Saskatchewan, S7L 0G2; Canada; 52.134°N 106.6804°W

Information
- Funding type: Public
- Motto: Tradition, Commitment, Excellence
- Opened: 1923
- School board: Saskatoon Public Schools
- Principal: Sarah Nahachewsky
- Grades: Grade 9 to Grade 12
- Enrollment: 668 (2022)
- Language: English
- Colours: Red, White and Black
- Mascot: Big Red
- Team name: Redhawks
- Website: Bedford Road Collegiate

Bedford Road Collegiate is a public high school on the west side of the city of Saskatoon, Saskatchewan. It is Saskatoon's second oldest high school, opened on February 12, 1923. It is also known as BRCI (Bedford Road Collegiate Institute), or Bedford. Bedford Road Collegiate is part of the Saskatoon Public School Division.The school is well-known for hosting the Bedford Road Invitational Tournament (BRIT), one of the largest high school basketball events in Western Canada. As an International Baccalaureate (IB) World School, Bedford Road offers the rigorous IB Diploma Program, along with specialized courses such as Cadet Orientation Police Studies (COPS), Fire Introduction Recruitment Experience (FIRE), and Pre-Engineering. Additionally, the school provides various arts and technical programs, including Visual Arts, and Guitar and Amplifier Design.

Feeder schools are Caswell Community School, Henry Kelsey School, King George Community School, Mayfair Community School, and Westmount Community School.

== History ==
In 1948, Bedford Road Collegiate celebrated its 25th anniversary. This milestone was commemorated with a series of events held from March 2 to March 5, including reunions, performances, and assemblies attended by former students and staff. The Saskatoon Star-Phoenix reported extensively on the celebrations, emphasizing the school's contributions to the community over its first quarter-century. A souvenir programme was also produced for the event, offering a detailed account of the school's achievements up to that point. The programme contained interviews, photographs, and essays, which highlighted the school's early years and its evolution within the Saskatoon community.

By 1983, Bedford Road Collegiate had reached its 60th anniversary. The celebration included a large-scale alumni reunion and various activities to honor the school's legacy. The Saskatoon Star-Phoenix again covered the event, focusing on the strong bonds former students maintained with the school after six decades of operation. Notably, the school's alumni committee organized a historical exhibit showcasing artifacts, yearbooks, and memorabilia from its first 60 years. A detailed history of the school up to 1983 was published as part of the celebration.

In 2008, the school marked its 85th anniversary with an even larger alumni reunion, which brought together multiple generations of former students and staff. A key highlight of the celebration was the recognition of Bedford Road Collegiate's impact on local education and its reputation for fostering strong community ties. The event also featured performances by student groups, historical presentations, and the unveiling of a new plaque honoring the school's long-standing role in Saskatoon.

As Bedford Road Collegiate neared its centennial in 2023, the school continued to celebrate its rich history and legacy in Saskatoon. Plans for the centennial included a series of events aimed at celebrating the school's cultural and educational contributions over the past century. Additionally, alumni committees collaborated with local historians to produce a centennial documentary, highlighting the school's role in shaping the city's educational landscape.

== Campus ==
The Bedford Road Collegiate campus is located in the Westmount neighborhood of Saskatoon, close to the downtown area. The school building is a blend of historic and modern architecture, reflecting its long history and continuous updates over the years.

The original structure, built in 1923, features traditional brick architecture, which has been carefully preserved to maintain its historical significance. Over the decades, the building has undergone several renovations to modernize its facilities, ensuring it remains up-to-date for contemporary educational needs.

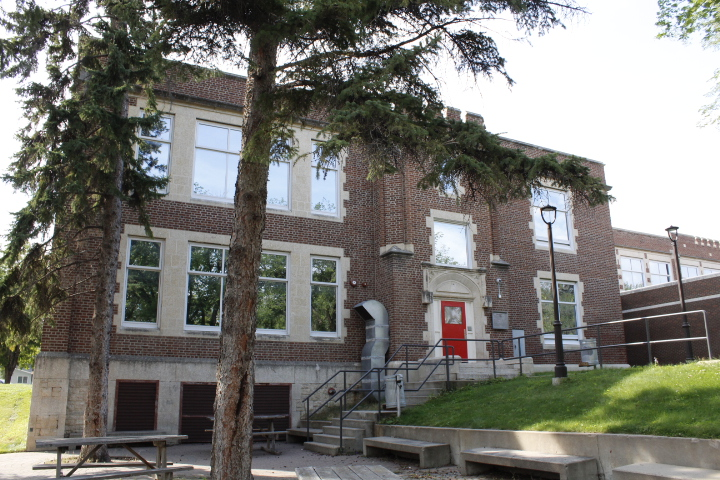
The school seen near Bedford Rd

The campus includes modern science labs, computer labs, and art studios. Its library serves as a resource hub for both students and staff. The school's auditorium, which hosts assemblies, theatrical productions, and community events, is a key feature of the campus. Additionally, a student commons area provides space for social interaction and study.

Athletic facilities at Bedford Road Collegiate include a gymnasium, a fitness center, and outdoor sports fields for soccer, football, and track and field activities.

== Mascot controversy ==
In the early 1960s, Bedford Road Collegiate adopted the "Indian Head" logo as the symbol for its sports teams, replacing the original "Lantern" logo. This change reflected the team name, the "Redmen," a term historically linked to the red uniforms worn by the school's teams since its founding in 1923.

By the mid-1990s, there were growing concerns about the appropriateness of the "Redmen" name and the "Indian Head" logo, as many viewed them as offensive to Indigenous communities. Local activists and Indigenous groups began pushing for change, arguing that the mascot and name perpetuated racial stereotypes.

In 1996, a student vote was held regarding whether to retain the "Redmen" name and logo. The majority of students voted in favor of keeping both. However, the debate did not end there. Over the years, calls for change resurfaced, particularly in 2011 when local Indigenous leaders renewed their objections to the continued use of the imagery.

In 2013, tensions heightened when a group of protestors attempted to demonstrate against the "Redmen" name at the Bedford Road Invitational Tournament, but they were blocked from entering the school by staff and police.

In 2014, following continued discussions and growing public pressure, the Bedford Road Collegiate administration decided to retire the "Redmen" name and the "Indian Head" logo. The school adopted the "Redhawks" as the new mascot, with a red-tailed hawk logo representing the teams, inspired by the red-tailed hawk native to the Saskatchewan region. A committee of students, staff, and alumni contributed to the selection of the new mascot and logo, ensuring a more inclusive representation for the school. The rebranding was completed by June 2014, and the new name and logo were introduced during that year's graduation ceremonies.

== Student life ==
=== Athletics ===
Bedford Road Collegiate's sports teams are known as the Redhawks, and (although less commonly used today) "Lady Redhawks" for female teams. Athletic programs include badminton, basketball, cheerleading, cross country running, curling, football, golf, soccer, track & field, volleyball, and wrestling. Bedford Road also hosts sports tournaments the Redhawks Classic and Redhawks Volley, along with the Bedford Road Invitational Tournament.

=== Graduation ===
Graduation ceremonies for Bedford Road Collegiate take place at Merlis Belsher Place, a prominent venue in Saskatoon, alongside other schools from the Saskatoon Public School Division.

=== Bedford Road Invitational Tournament ===
The Bedford Road Invitational Tournament (BRIT) is a prestigious boys' high school basketball tournament that has been held annually at Bedford Road Collegiate since 1968, with the exception of COVID-19 pandemic-related cancellations in 2021 and 2022. Over the years Brit has hosted 133 teams, more than 1,400 players, and teams from seven provinces and three countries.

== Notable alumni ==
- Ethel Catherwood, Olympic track and field gold medalist
- William Leonard Higgitt, RCMP Commissioner
- Roy Romanow, Premier of Saskatchewan (1991–2001)
- Lefty Wilkie, Major League Baseball player
