= Varsity View, Saskatoon =

Varsity View
- City of Saskatoon neighborhood
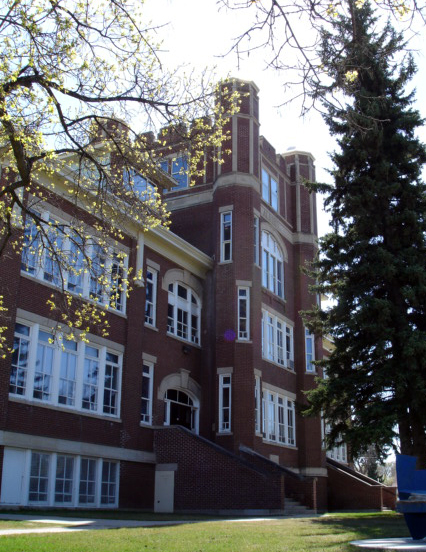
- Albert Community Centre (Albert School)

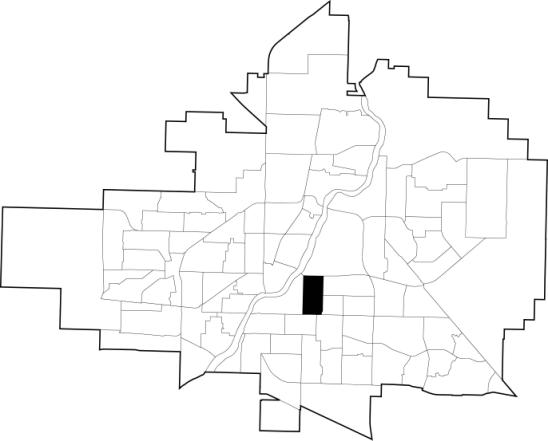
- Varsity View location map
- Coordinates: 52°7′27″N 106°38′29″W
- Country: Canada
- Province: Saskatchewan
- City: Saskatoon
- Suburban Development Area: Core Neighbourhoods
- Neighbourhood: Varsity View
- Annexed: 1911
- Construction: 1912-1960

Government
  - Type: Municipal (Ward 6)
  - Administrative body: Saskatoon City Council
  - Councillor: Jasmine Parker
  - MLA: Erika Ritchie
  - MP: Corey Tochor

Area
  - Total: 1.27 km^{2} (0.49 sq mi)

Population (2024)
  - Total: 3,935
  - Median personal income: $35,600
- Time zone: UTC-6 (UTC)
- Website: Varsity View Community Association

Varsity View is a mostly residential neighbourhood located near central Saskatoon, Saskatchewan, Canada. It is immediately south of the University of Saskatchewan campus. It is an older suburban subdivision, comprising a mixture of low-density, single detached dwellings, detached duplexes and apartment-style units. As of 2024, the area is home to 3,935 residents. The neighbourhood is considered a middle-income area, with a median personal income of $35,600, an average sale price of $485,305 and a home ownership rate of 43.0%. Its proximity to the university gives this area its relatively high postsecondary enrolment, almost 13% in 2024.

== History ==
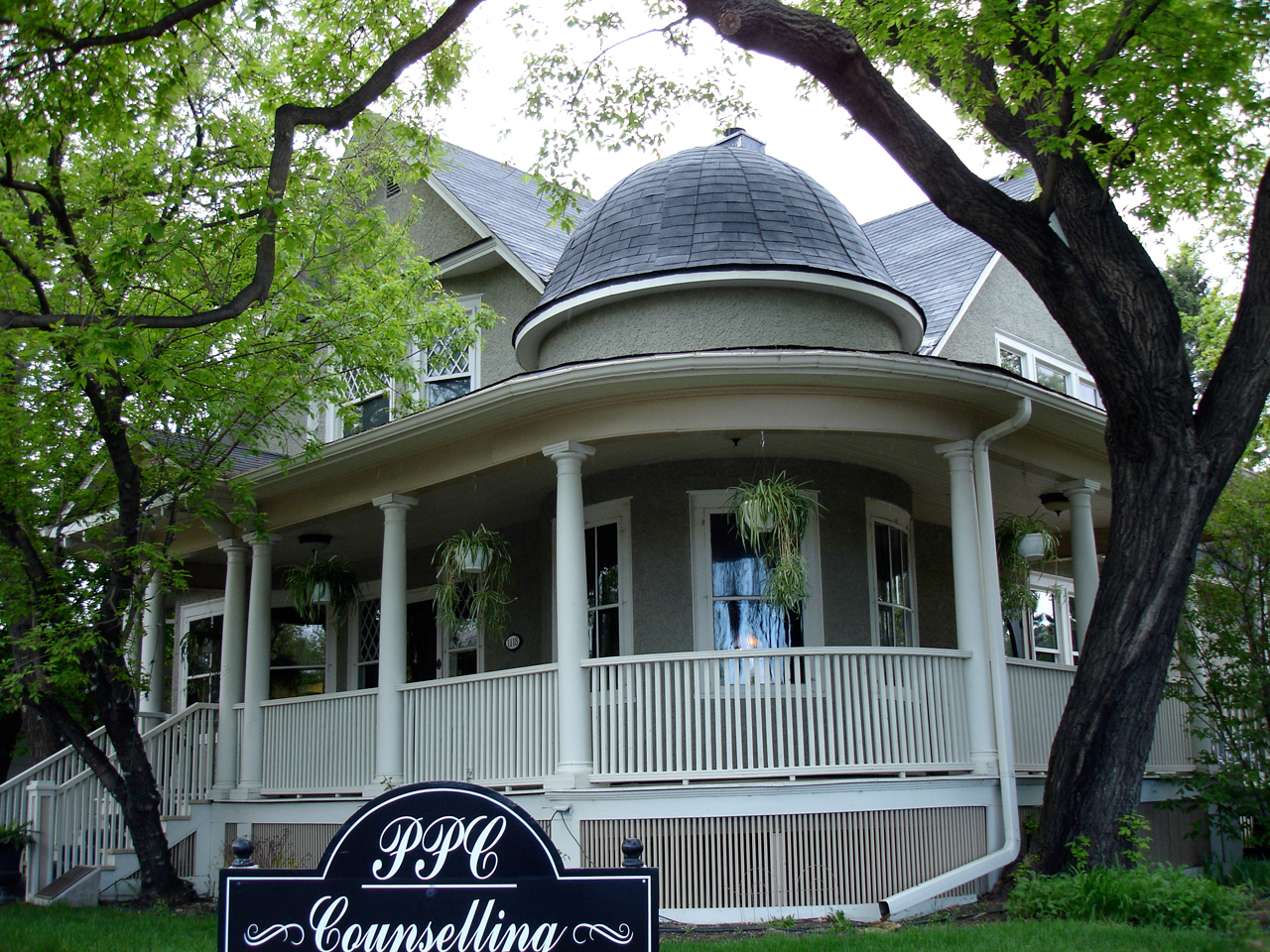
Bottomley House (1912)

Development was spurred by the establishment of the University of Saskatchewan in 1907. The land for the Varsity View neighbourhood was annexed by the city in 1911; it was among the first parcels of land annexed after Saskatoon's incorporation five years earlier. The first homeowner was Richard Bottomley, an English real estate developer who was said to have invested $1.5 million in the real estate boom of 1912. His house, now referred to as Bottomley House, is a large, Queen Anne Revival style home. It was designated a municipal heritage property on April 24, 2006.

In 1911, the school board purchased the block in which the Albert School would be constructed; it opened in 1912 at 610 Clarence Avenue South. It was designed in the Collegiate Gothic style by Scottish architect David Webster, who also designed several similar-looking schools (King George, King Edward, Buena Vista, Westmount, Caswell and Alexandra). Besides serving as an educational centre, Albert School played a big role in city sports, especially lacrosse and hockey. It was also used for other purposes, such as English classes for large numbers of Ukrainians in 1916.

According to a 1913 map, the current neighbourhood encompasses a collection of registered subdivisions were originally named University Annex, Bottomley Addition, Varsity Park and College Park (which would be reused to designate another neighbourhood). College Drive and Elliott Street were not substantially developed until the late 1920s, while neighbouring Osler Street had to wait for residential construction until the early 1950s. The majority of the housing stock was built between 1946 and 1960. The oldest homes are located at the neighbourhood's north and west ends, as development progressed from the university campus and Nutana's eastern edge. Two more schools, Brunskill and Bishop Murray, opened in the 1950s.

After more than seventy years, a drop in enrollments brought the closing of Albert School in 1978, after which it served as the centre for l'Ecole Francaise de Saskatoon. It became the Albert Community Centre in 1982, sparing it from the wrecking ball. It was officially designated a municipal heritage property on October 11, 1983.

== Government and politics ==
Varsity View exists within the federal electoral district of Saskatoon—University. It is currently represented by Corey Tochor of the Conservative Party of Canada, first elected in 2019.

Provincially, the area is divided by Temperance St and Clarence Ave N into the constituencies of Saskatoon Nutana and Saskatoon University-Sutherland. Saskatoon Nutana encompasses most of the neighbourhood and is currently represented by Erika Ritchie of the Saskatchewan New Democratic Party since 2020. Saskatoon University-Sutherland encompasses the area north of Temperance St and east of Clarence Ave N and is currently represented by Tajinder Grewal of the Saskatchewan New Democratic Party since 2024.

In Saskatoon's non-partisan municipal politics, Varsity View lies within ward 6. It is currently represented by Councillor Jasmine Parker, first elected in 2024.

== Institutions ==
=== Education ===
Bishop Murray High School
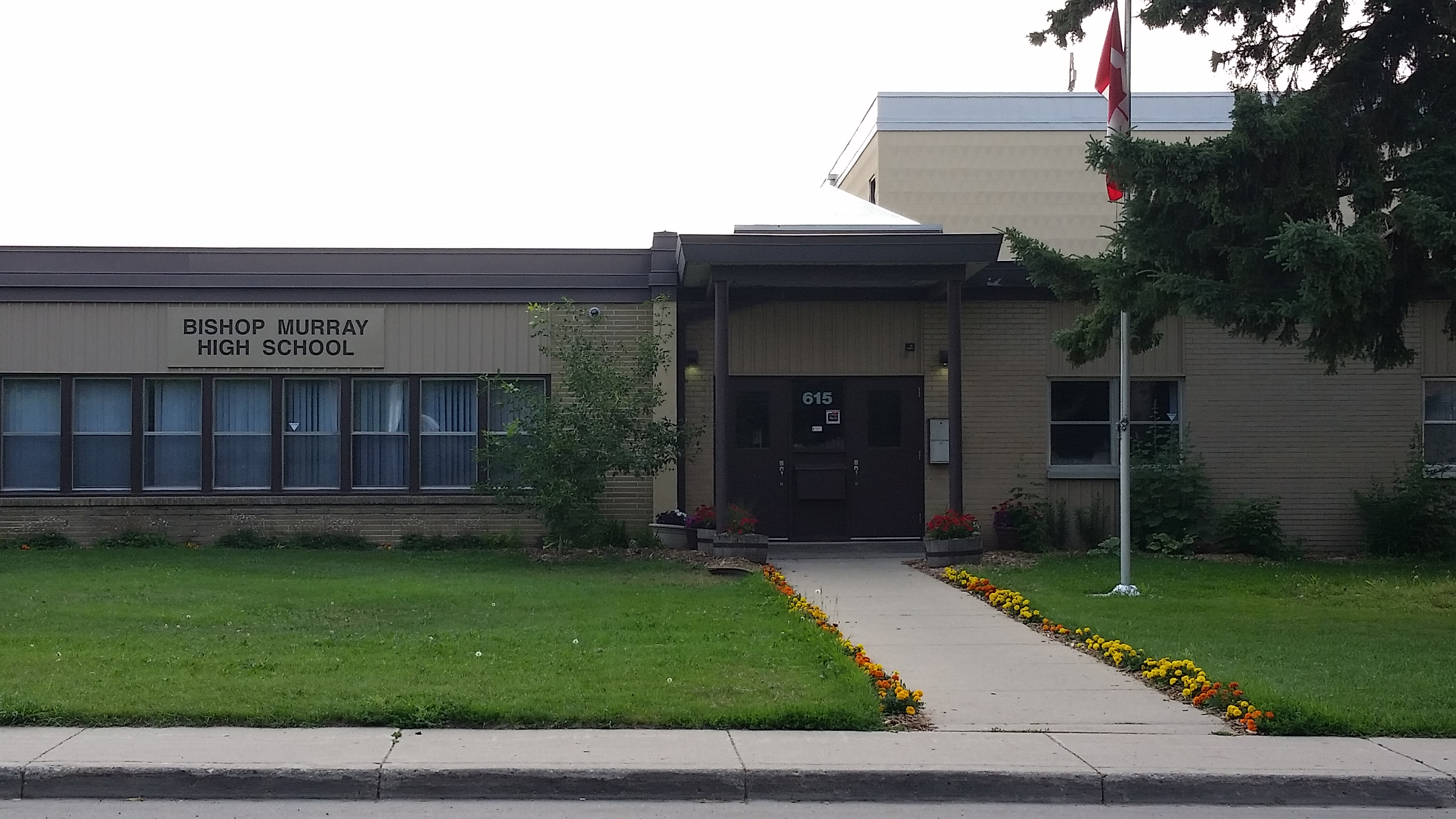

Location
- 615 Wiggins Avenue South; Saskatoon, Saskatchewan, S7H 2J2; Canada; 52.119238°N 106.639356°W

Information
- Type: Secondary, Referral Program
- Religious affiliation: Catholic
- Opened: 1954
- School board: Greater Saskatoon Catholic Schools
- Principal: Rebecca Epple
- Grades: Grade 9 to Grade 12
- Enrollment: 138 (2025)
- Education system: Separate
- Language: English
- Website: Bishop Murray High School

Brunskill School
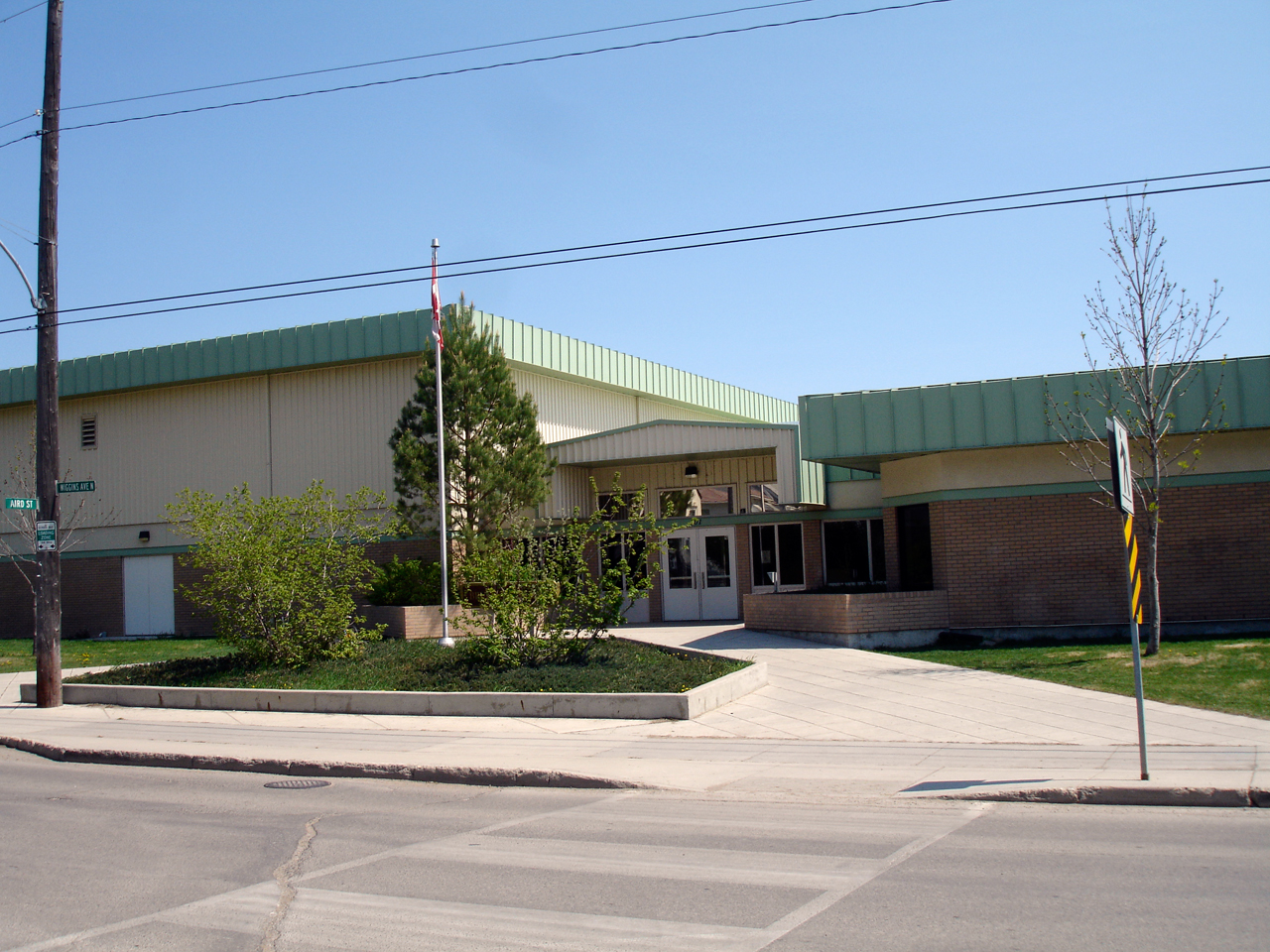

Location
- 101 Wiggins Avenue North; Saskatoon, Saskatchewan, S7N 1K3; Canada; 52°7′29.33″N 106°38′18.04″W

Information
- Type: Elementary
- Motto: Respect - Responsibility - Ready to Learn
- Opened: 1951
- School board: Saskatoon Public School Division
- Principal: Miranda Low
- Grades: Pre-Kindergarten to Grade 8
- Enrollment: 431 (2025)
- Education system: Public
- Colours: Maroon and Grey
- Mascot: Brunskill Bear
- Feeder to: Aden Bowman Collegiate
- Website: Brunskill School

- Bishop Murray High School - separate (Catholic) secondary, part of Greater Saskatoon Catholic Schools. The school was originally an elementary school when it opened in 1954, but was converted in 1995 to a high school with alternative programs.
- Brunskill School - public elementary, part of the Saskatoon Public School Division. The school was opened in 1951 and was built at a cost of $247,430 ($3,019,015.30 in 2025). It was named after William 'Cy' Brunskill, a longtime member of the school board. It was the first single-storey school in Saskatoon with a specially designed kindergarten room and main floor playrooms. It was also the first school where the principal was not assigned a particular grade to teach. Brunskill School was the first Saskatoon elementary school to have a centralized library. The school was closed for the 1999-2000 school year while almost the entire building was demolished and then rebuilt. Classes resumed at the "renovated" school in the fall of 2000.

=== Other ===
- University of Saskatchewan - Varsity View is the closest residential neighbourhood to the U of S core campus, located across College Drive, with additional facilities on the eastern periphery of the community across Cumberland Avenue.
- Albert Community Centre - formerly Albert School, now a multipurpose facility for community events
- Kinsmen Children's Centre - facility opened in 1985 and attached to Brunskill School, housing several agencies to help children with special needs
- Luthercare Communities - assisted living and care facility for senior citizens

== Parks and recreation ==
- Raoul Wallenberg Park (2.6 acres)
- Cumberland Park (3.3 acres)
- Albert Park (3.4 acres)
- President Murray Park (7.3 acres)

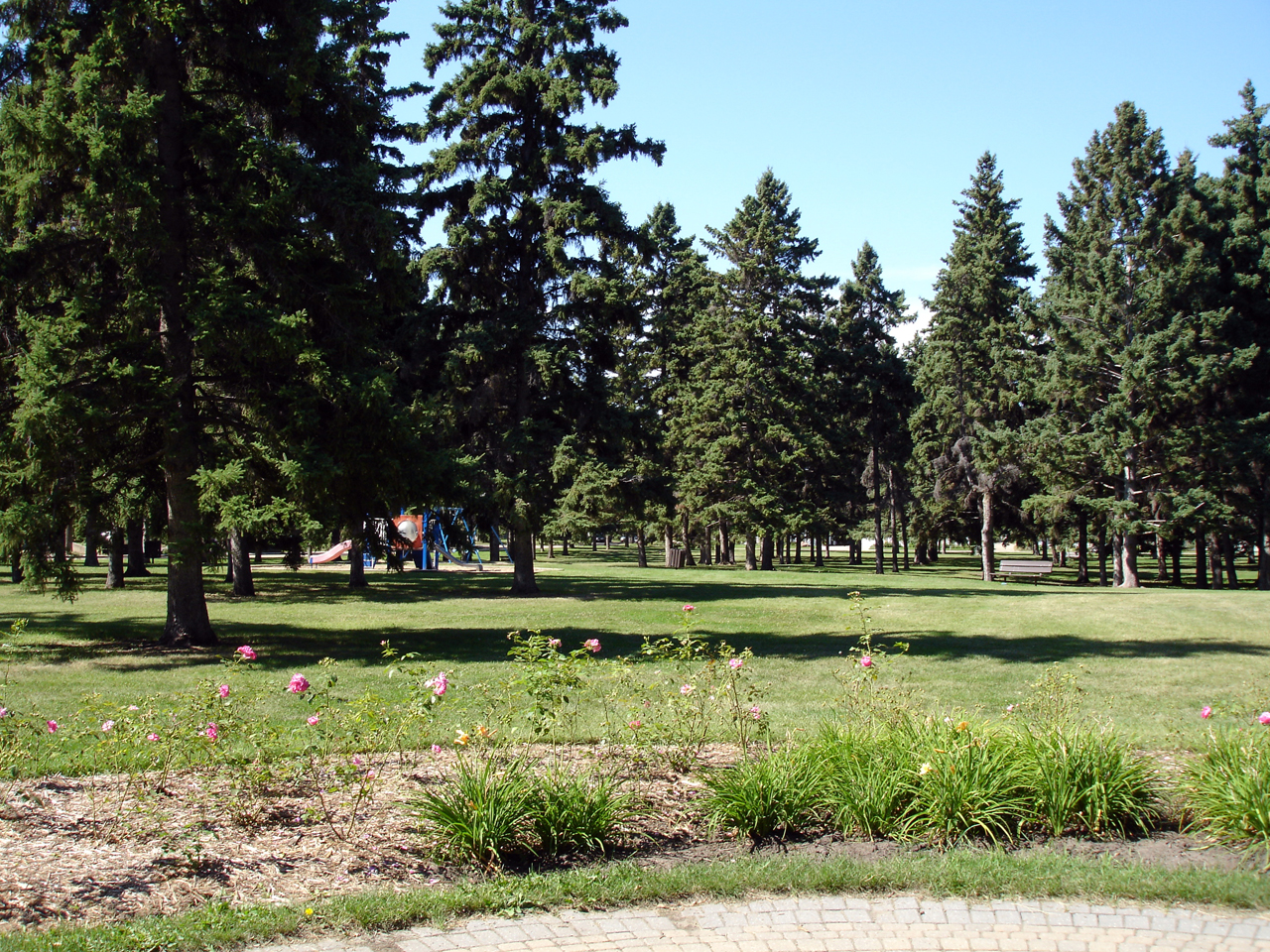
President Murray Park

The planting of 1500 spruce trees in President Murray Park was done under the supervision of Wyndham Winkler Ashley, a charter member of the Saskatoon Parks Board in 1912. W.W. Ashley Park in the Haultain neighbourhood was named in his honour.

The Varsity View Community Association organizes events, delivers recreational and leisure programs, coordinates sports programs for children/youth and maintains the outdoor rink at Brunskill School.

== Commercial ==
Commercial development is limited; some businesses are located at the southern edge of the neighbourhood, within the 8th Street business district. There are also a few businesses clustered near College Drive and Cumberland Avenue, bordering the University of Saskatchewan campus. A couple of businesses also exist adjacent to Brunskill School on Temperance Street and Wiggans Avenue. 57 home-based businesses exist in the neighbourhood as of 2024. Closest major commercial developments are the Central Business District (aka Downtown), and the 8th Street and Broadway Avenue business strips.

== Location ==
Varsity View is located within the Core Neighbourhoods Suburban Development Area. It is bounded by College Drive to the north, 8th Street to the south, Cumberland Avenue to the east, and Clarence Avenue to the west. Roads are laid out in a grid fashion; streets run east-west, avenues run north-south. The University Bridge connects the north end of the neighbourhood to the west side of Saskatoon.
