= Caswell Hill, Saskatoon =

District in Saskatoon, Saskatchewan, Canada

Caswell Hill
- Saskatoon Neighbourhood
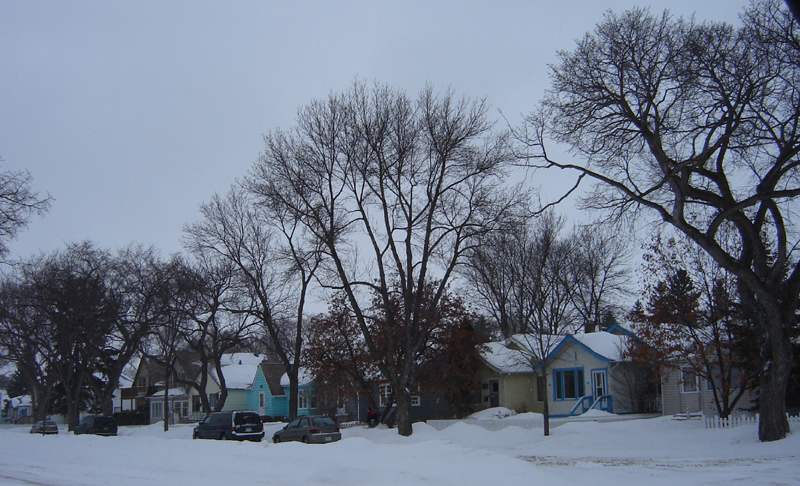
- Caswell Hill Homes
- Interactive map of Caswell Hill
- Coordinates: 52°8′18″N 106°40′36″W
- Country: Canada
- Province: Saskatchewan
- City: Saskatoon
- Suburban Development Area: Core Neighbourhoods SDA

Government
  - Type: Municipal (Ward 2)
  - Administrative body: Saskatoon City Council
  - Councillor: Hilary Gough

Population (2005)
  - Total: 3,505
  - Average Income: $40,217
- Time zone: UTC-6 (CST)

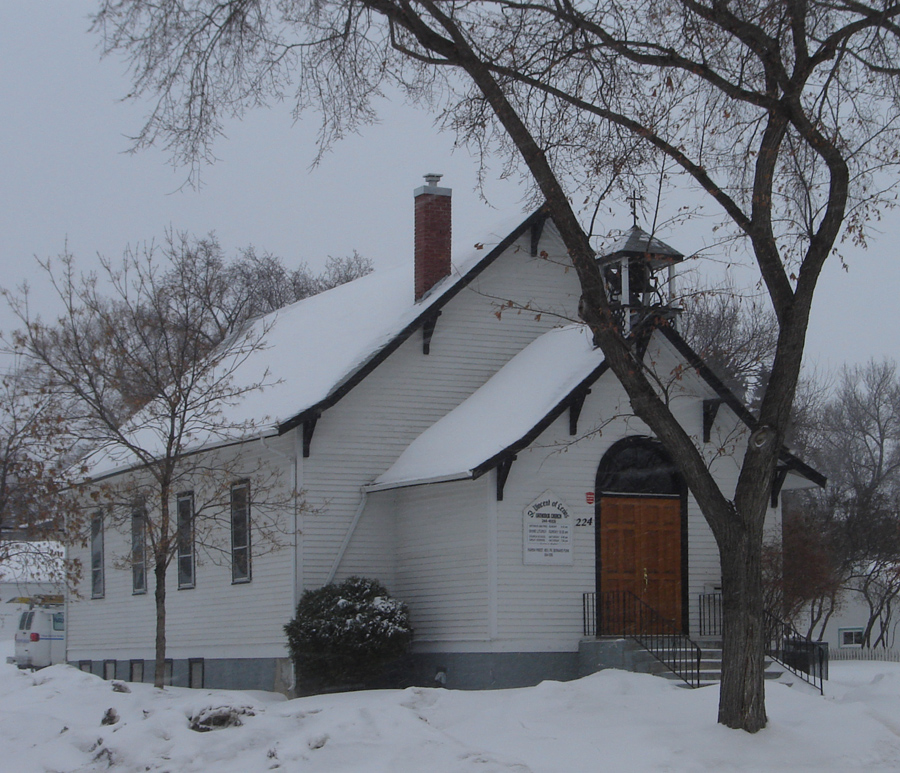
Orthodox Church

Caswell Hill is a district in the city of Saskatoon, Saskatchewan, Canada. It derives its name from an early homesteader Robert Caswell one of the Temperance Colonists of 1883. It is an area of beautiful character homes first built ca. 1905, tiny war-time houses, and newer houses. Caswell is a thriving and diverse community nestled between two economic areas, the downtown core, and the stores lining 33rd Street West.

Caswell Hill is bounded by 22nd Street to the south, Avenue H to the west, 33rd Street to the north, and Idylwyld Drive to the east.

== Layout ==
Streets are laid out east and west, avenues are laid out running north and south. Streets increment in number as travel heads northward. Avenues increment alphabetically as travel proceeds west. The whole of the Caswell Hill community is also laid out in a grid pattern.

== Historic sites ==
Saskatoon Railway Station (Canadian Pacific) is one of many Saskatoon buildings listed in the Canadian Register of Historic Places. It is a Château style station which was built in 1907. Its current address is 305 Idylwyld Drive North, Idylwyld Drive used to be called Avenue A.

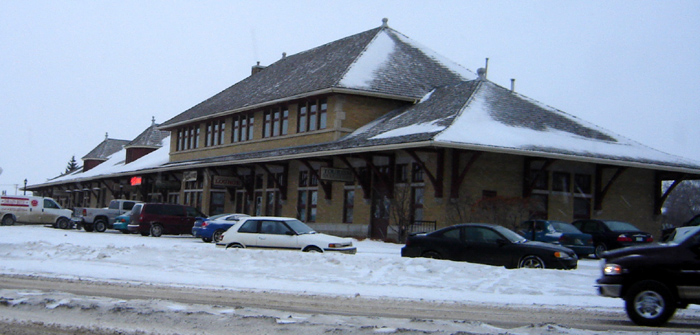
Canadian Pacific Railway Station – 305 Idylwyld Drive North

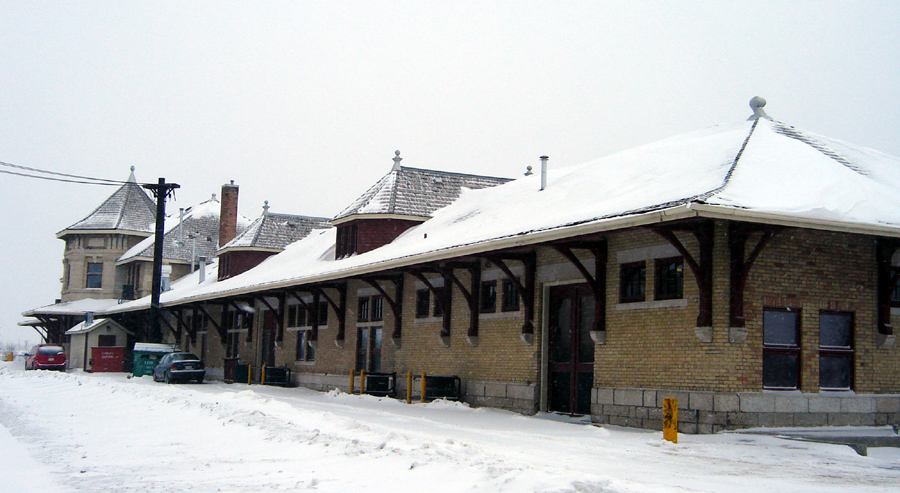
Canadian Pacific Railway Station

== Government and politics ==
Caswell Hill exists within the federal electoral district of Saskatoon West. It is currently represented by Brad Redekopp of the Conservative Party of Canada, first elected in 2019.

Provincially, the area is mostly within the constituency of Saskatoon Centre. It is currently represented by Betty Nippi-Albright of the Saskatchewan New Democratic Party, first elected in 2020. The northern tip of the neighbourhood northeast of 32nd Street and Avenue I lies within the constituency of Saskatoon Westview.

In Saskatoon's non-partisan municipal politics, King George lies within ward 2. It is currently represented by Hilary Gough, first elected in 2016.

== Education ==
Caswell Community School
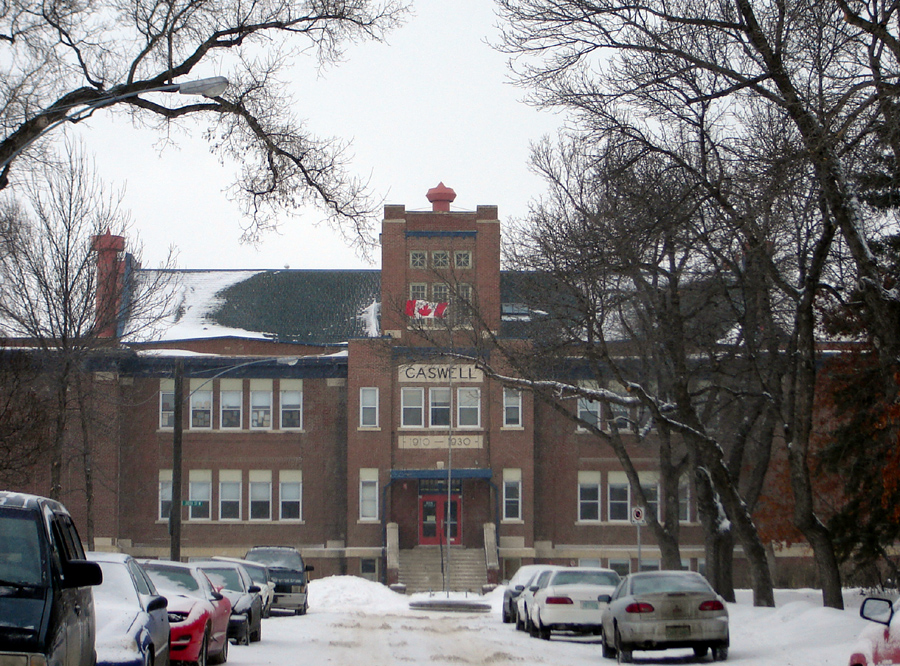
- 204 - 30th Street West; Saskatoon, Saskatchewan, S7L 0N9; Canada

Information
- Type: Elementary
- Opened: 1910
- School board: Saskatoon Public Schools
- Principal: Kendall Pierce
- Grades: Kindergarten to Grade 8
- Enrollment: 217 (2017)
- Education system: Public
- Language: English
- Feeder to: Bedford Road Collegiate
- Website: Caswell Community School

- Ashworth Holmes School (but later renamed Prince of Wales School) opened for classes in 1909. It was constructed on Ashworth Holmes Hill (present-day site of Mayfair Pool).
- Caswell School, public elementary school. It was constructed 1910 and again named for Robert W. Caswell who had farmed at this location.
- Bedford Road Collegiate, public secondary school
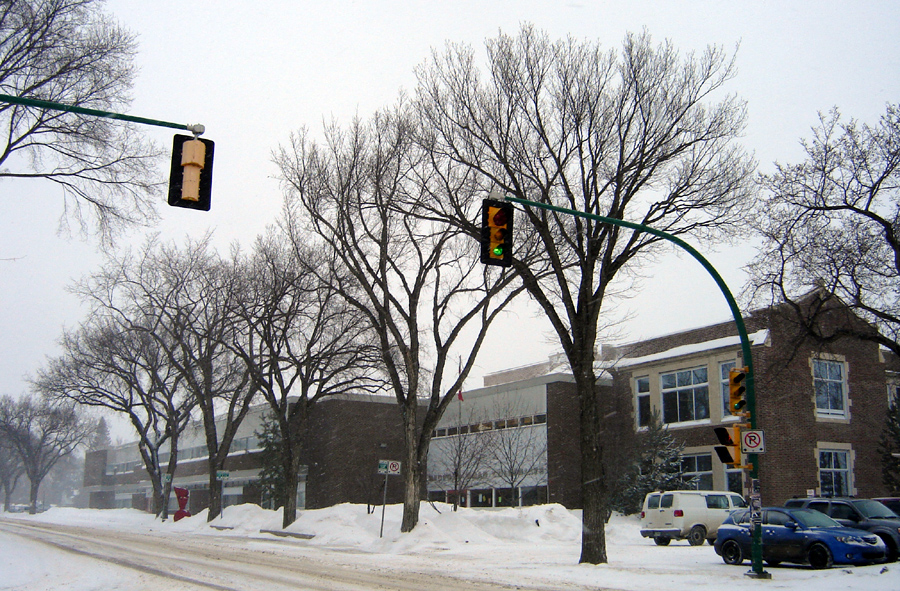
Bedford Road Collegiate

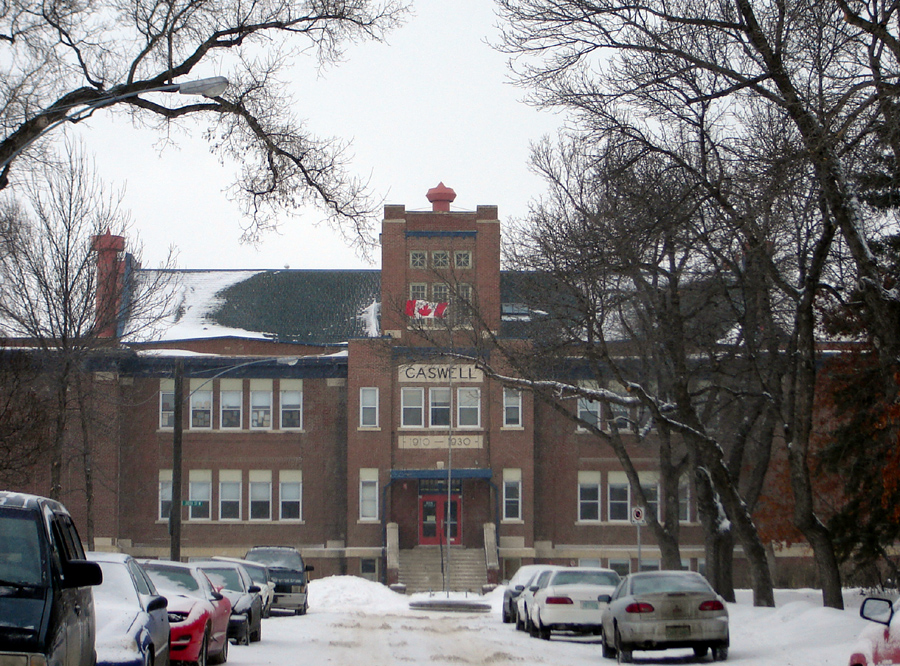
Caswell School

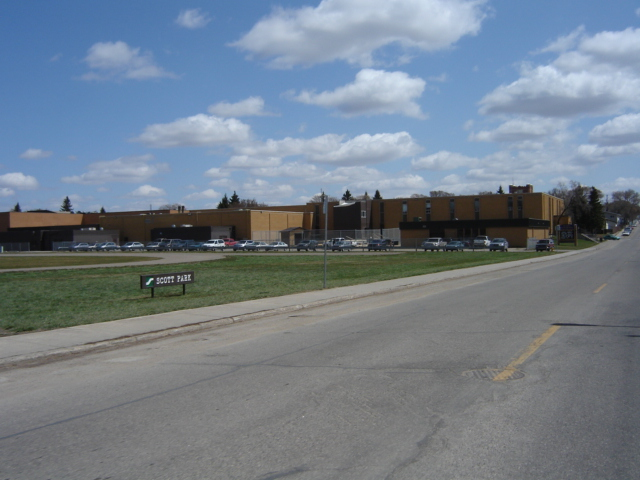
E.D. Feehan High School

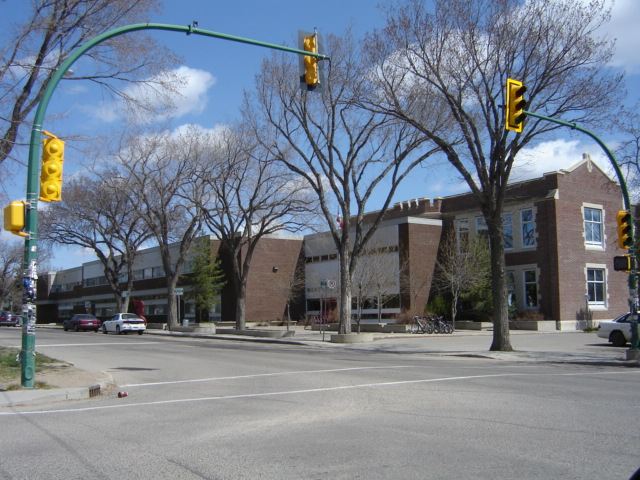
Bedford Road Collegiate

== Shopping ==
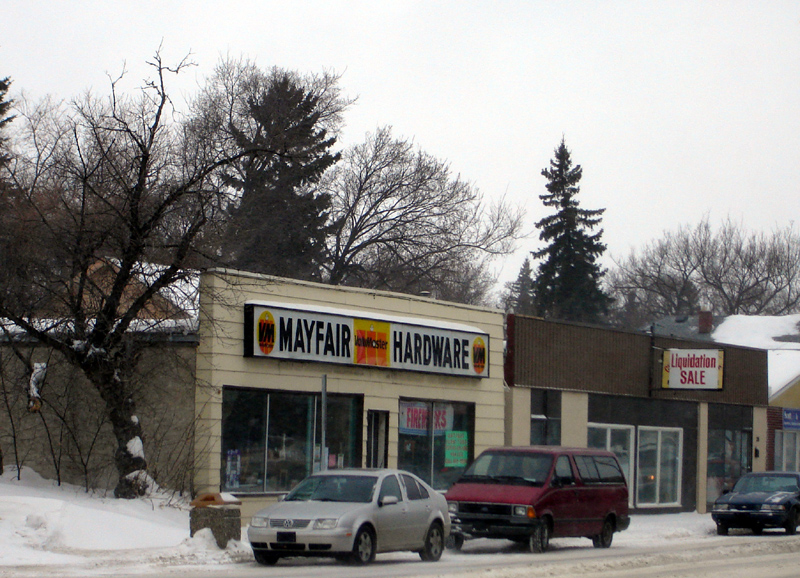
Mayfair Hardware

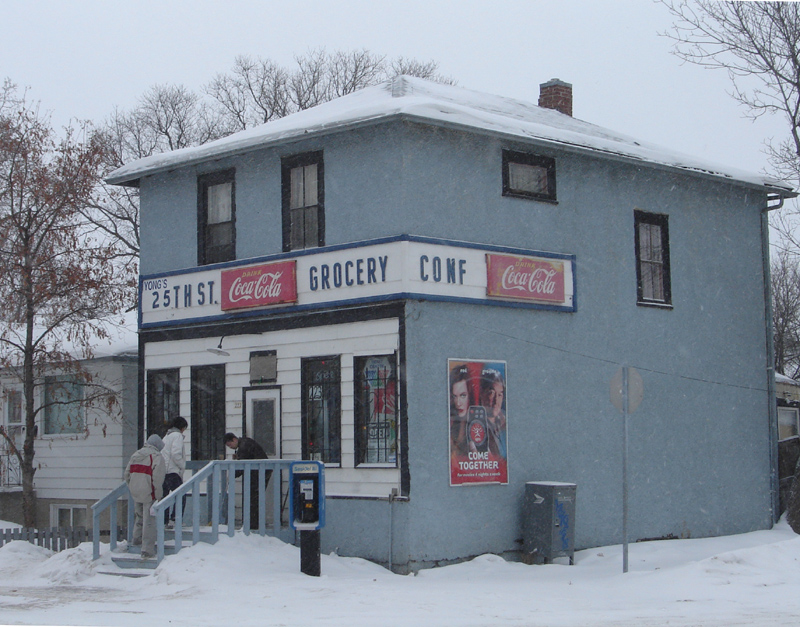
25th Street Grocery

Small shops, cafes, and amenities line both sides of 33rd Street West.

== Area parks ==
- Ashworth – Holmes Park (12.68 acres) derived its name from John H. Holmes and John Ashworth. These realtors of the early 1900s purchased most of the land now named the Caswell Hill Subdivision. (Their purchase was bordered by Idylwyld to Avenue H and 22nd to 29th Streets) They subdivided the land and sold it, but donated 10 acres (40,000 m^{2}) to the City which became this park area. [This isn't actually possible, because the Ashworth-Holmes park lies outside of the bounds mentioned above. It is bound by 30th and 31st Streets.]

== Swimming facilities ==
- Mayfair Swimming Pool – 1025 Ave F North – pool with mini waterslide

== Transportation ==
=== City transit ===
Caswell Hill is serviced by City Transit Bus Routes and since 1913, has housed the city's original streetcar building at Avenue C and 24th Street. The city transit headquarters afterwards adopted these buildings for bus warehouse garages and offices between Avenue C and D at 24th Street. A seven million CA$ consultant plan has been approved by the Saskatoon planning and operations committee to relocate the transit bus barns. The Caswell neighbourhood will be revitalized by renovating the 13-acre (53,000 m^{2}) area with a community for artists and musicians enhanced with a music festival.

22nd Street (Highway 14) is a major thoroughfare through Saskatoon. Highway 7 has its junction at (Highway 14. Highway 14 connects with Asquith, Biggar Wilkie, Unity, and Macklin en route to Alberta.

Idylwyld Drive has had many titles: Avenue A, (Highway 11 and most currently Louis Riel Trail. It is a main thoroughfare through the city connecting Regina, Saskatoon and Prince Albert, Saskatchewan. It also connects west Saskatoon with the bedroom communities of Warman and Martensville

== Life ==
Caswell Community Association provides leisure activities for various age groups and operates out of Caswell School
