= University Bridge (Saskatoon) =

Bridge in Saskatoon, Saskatchewan, Canada

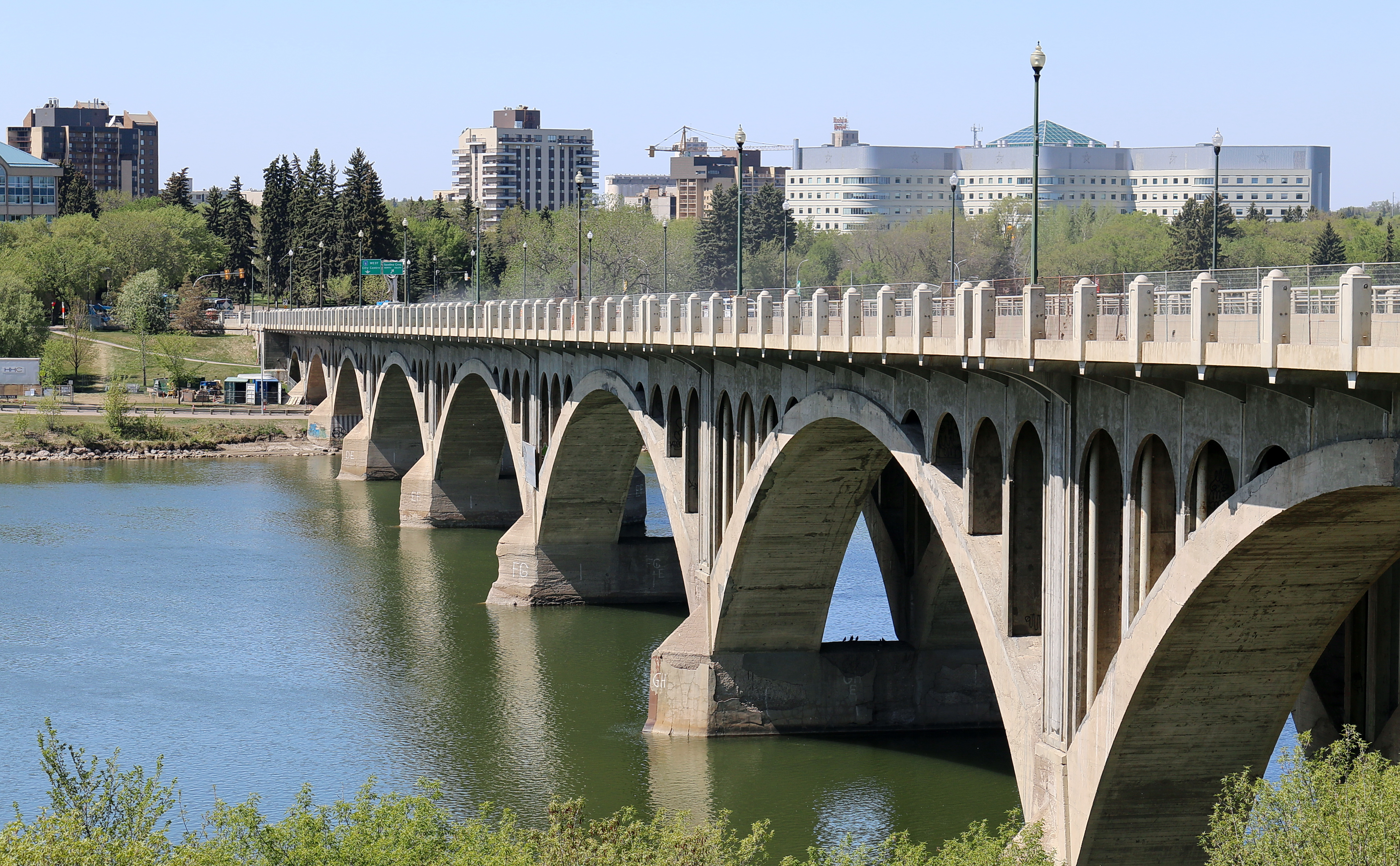
- University Bridge
- Coordinates: 52°07′49″N 106°38′57″W
- Carries: 4 lanes of College Drive/25th Street, pedestrians and bicycles
- Crosses: South Saskatchewan River
- Locale: Saskatoon, Saskatchewan, Canada
- Official name: University Bridge
- Maintained by: City of Saskatoon
- Preceded by: Broadway Bridge
- Followed by: CPR Bridge

Characteristics
- Design: Open spandrel deck arch
- Material: Reinforced concrete
- Total length: 1,100 feet (335 m)
- Width: 65 feet (20 m)
- No. of spans: 10
- Piers in water: 5

History
- Designer: Adam P. Linton / Daniel Luten
- Construction start: 1913-09-02
- Construction end: 1916
- Opened: 1916-11-15

Location
- Interactive map of University Bridge

The University Bridge spans the South Saskatchewan River between Clarence Avenue and College Drive on the east shore with 25th Street on the west in Saskatoon, Saskatchewan Canada. The bridge is also known as the 25th Street Bridge and is a major commuter route between the two halves of Saskatoon. Between its opening in 1916 and the opening of the Circle Drive Bridge in 1983, it was the northernmost vehicular river crossing in the city. It is named for the fact that it provides access to the University of Saskatchewan.

The University Bridge was originally planned to be of steel truss construction, much like the Traffic Bridge. Instead, a new design was used and Saskatoon saw the start of its first reinforced concrete arch bridge in 1913. The original contractor, R.J. Lecky, badly underbid on the tender, had problems with its concrete, and faced conflict of interest charges. One pier of the bridge had to be rebuilt and, due to the impact of the First World War on the global economy, the company went bankrupt and the provincial government had to finish building the bridge itself. When completed in 1916 it was the longest bridge of its kind in Canada.

A number of urban legends have surrounded the bridge since its construction. One of the stories was that the original contractor mixed straw in with the concrete to save money. Another rumour said that a worker fell to his death into one of the forms when the bridge piers were being poured, and his remains lie entombed to the present day. While sensational, none of these stories are supported by actual evidence.

In February 1969, the city of Saskatoon included a replacement of University Bridge (a task estimated to cost $7 million) within a 15-year capital plan. These plans did not come to fruition and the original University Bridge has undergone rehabilitation and repair work in 1972, 1985, 1998, and 2015. With the closure and demolition of the original Traffic Bridge in 2016, the University Bridge became Saskatoon's oldest surviving vehicular bridge.

== See also ==
- List of crossings of the South Saskatchewan River
- List of bridges in Canada
