= City of Medicine Hat (sternwheeler) =

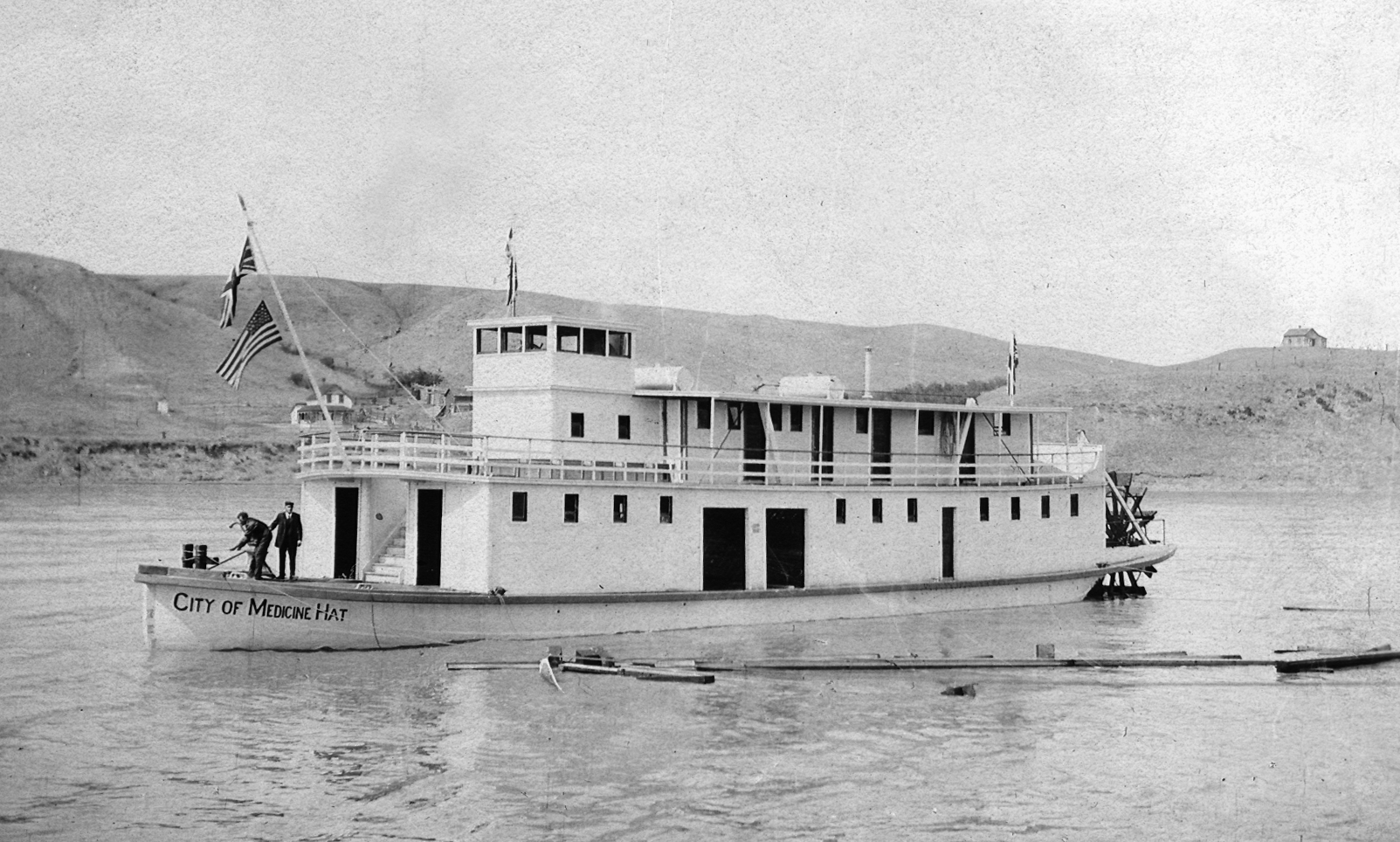
- SS City of Medicine Hat in 1907

History

Canada
- Name: City of Medicine Hat
- Launched: June 04, 1907
- In service: 1907-1908
- Fate: Wrecked 7 June 1908

General characteristics
- Length: 130 ft (39.6 m)
- Beam: 26 ft (7.9 m)
- Speed: 12 knots

City of Medicine Hat was a paddle steamer sternwheeler that worked on the Saskatchewan River in Medicine Hat, Alberta, and Saskatchewan, Canada, from 1907 until its wreck and sinking on June 7, 1908.

== History ==
Designed by her captain, Horatio Hamilton Ross, City of Medicine Hat was built in Medicine Hat, over the winter of 1906–07. Ross and his investors raised $28,000 to construct the ship, which was outfitted with oak and brass, an ornate music box, and a number of amenities. The ship was christened and launched in spring 1907 and embarked on pleasure cruises and shipping ventures throughout the season. The ship was the third sternwheeler built by Ross, a Scottish nobleman who came to Canada in the late 19th century and established a steam-shipping empire across the prairies.

== Final voyage ==
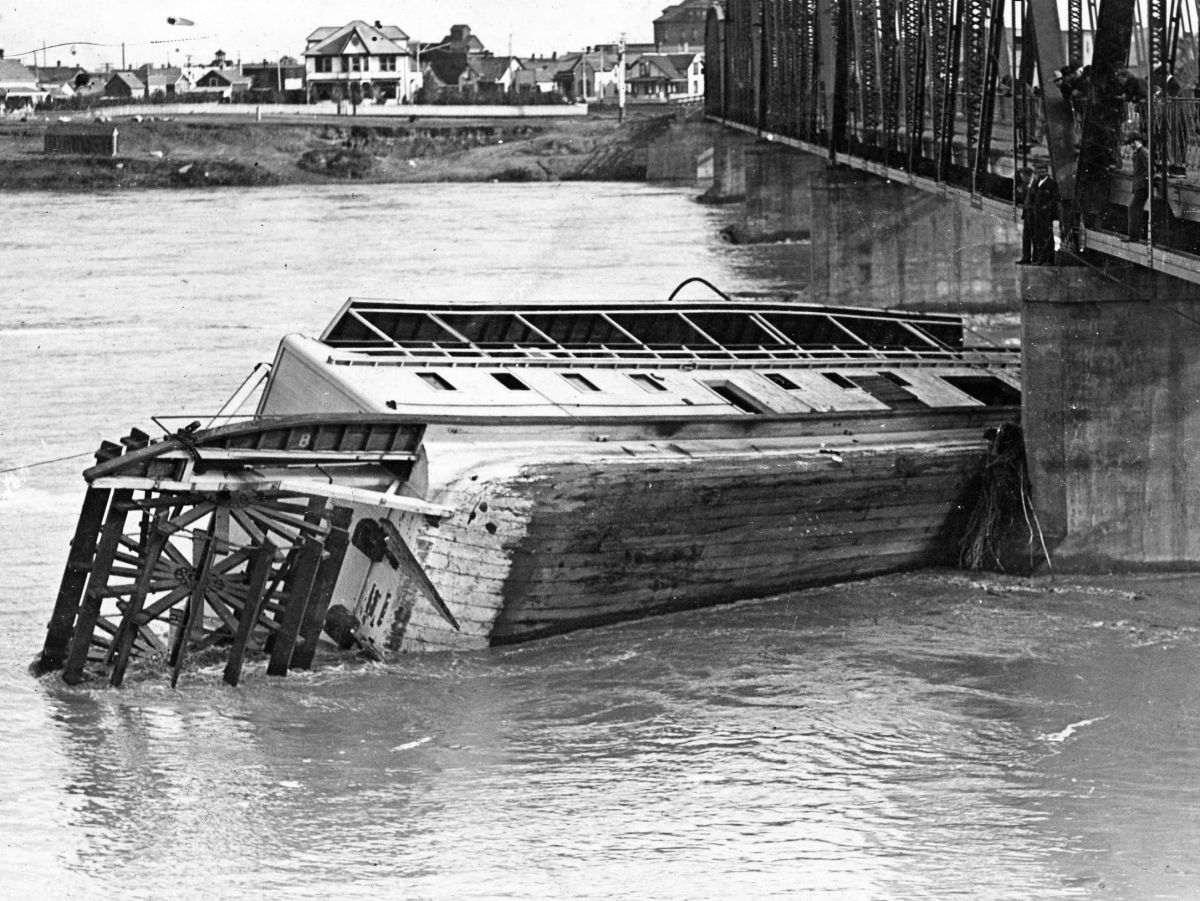
City of Medicine Hat capsized after crashing into the Traffic Bridge

In the spring of 1908, Ross decided to sail City of Medicine Hat from Medicine Hat, Alberta, to Winnipeg, Manitoba, with a number of friends and crew on board. Having reached Saskatoon on June 7, Ross attempted to navigate the ship safely through the rail bridges that spanned the South Saskatchewan River in a full spring flood. He let the passengers off just before reaching the Grand Trunk Bridge and lowered the ship's smokestack. The high water concealed telegraph wires just beneath the surface, which became entangled in the ship's rudder, rendering the steering of the vessel impossible. The ship foundered and struck the south-most pier of the newly constructed Traffic Bridge. The crew were able to escape the sinking ship and no casualties were reported. However, City of Medicine Hat was ruled a total loss. A sandbar eventually developed around the wreck and engulfed it. It was further buried when Rotary Park was created with landfill built up along the east bank near the Traffic Bridge.

== Archeological project ==
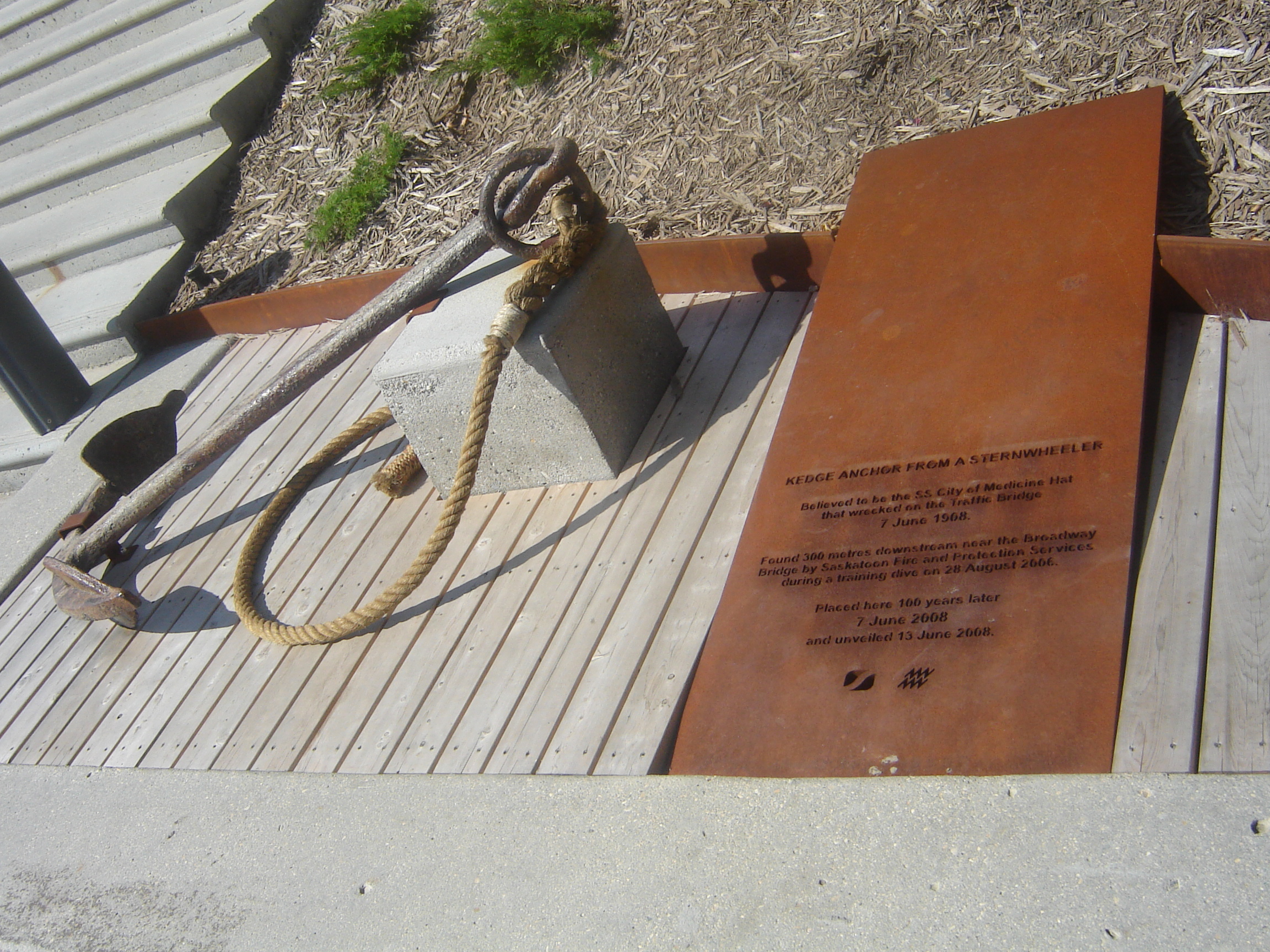
Anchor has been moved from under Traffic Bridge seen here, and is now on display inside at the Meewasin Valley Centre meewasin.com

In 2006, Saskatoon Fire and Protective Services divers discovered a large kedge anchor during a routine training dive. The anchor, presumed to be from City of Medicine Hat due to its exact likeness to the ship's anchors seen in photographs, was conserved and is now on display at the Meewasin Valley Centre in Saskatoon. This discovery led to a full-scale, five-day underwater excavation, which was conducted September 8–12, 2008. A number of artifacts were uncovered from the water. A second collection of artifacts was unearthed in 2012 by archaeologists, after work crews demolishing the Traffic Bridge had uncovered objects after drilling holes in the riverbed. It included fragments of the ship's hull, leading the archeologists to believe they had located the remains of the wreck itself. In 2013, an archaeologist researching the recovered artifacts suggested that Captain Ross might have deliberately wrecked the ship, citing the lack of personal items found and the fact that the ship had been losing money.

== Documentary ==
A film crew consisting of director Leanne Schinkel, producer Nils Sorensen, and editor Corby Evenson recorded the entire excavation for a feature-length documentary entitled The Last Steamship: The Search for the SS City of Medicine Hat. The film was released on September 3, 2010.
