= Gordie Howe Bridge =

Gordie Howe Bridge may refer to:

- Gordie Howe International Bridge, Detroit River crossing between Detroit and Windsor
- Gordie Howe Bridge (Saskatoon), South Saskatchewan River crossing in Saskatoon
