= CPR Bridge (Saskatoon) =

Bridge in Saskatoon, Saskatchewan, Canada

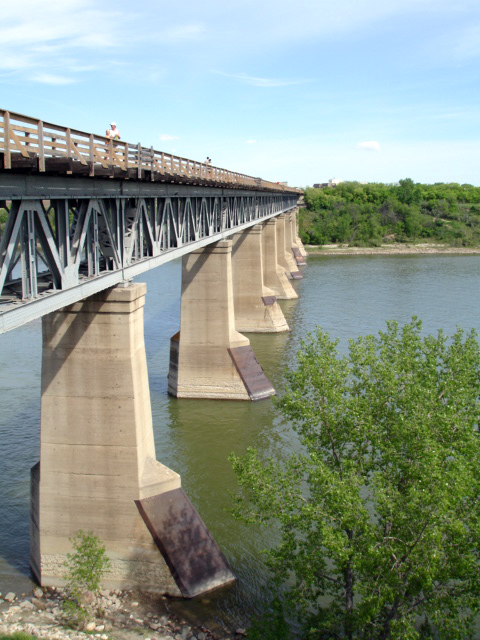
- CPR Bridge over the South Saskatchewan River
- Coordinates: 52°08′34″N 106°38′28″W
- Carries: Canadian Pacific Railway tracks
- Crosses: South Saskatchewan River
- Locale: Saskatoon, Saskatchewan, Canada
- Official name: CPR Bridge
- Maintained by: City of Saskatoon
- Preceded by: University Bridge
- Followed by: Circle Drive Bridge

Characteristics
- Design: Truss bridge
- Material: Steel, wood, concrete
- Total length: 341 metres (1,119 ft)
- Height: 19.5 metres (64 ft)
- Piers in water: 7

History
- Construction end: 1908
- Opened: June 15, 1908

Location
- Interactive map of CPR Bridge

The CPR Bridge is a Canadian railway bridge that spans the South Saskatchewan River in Saskatoon, Saskatchewan.

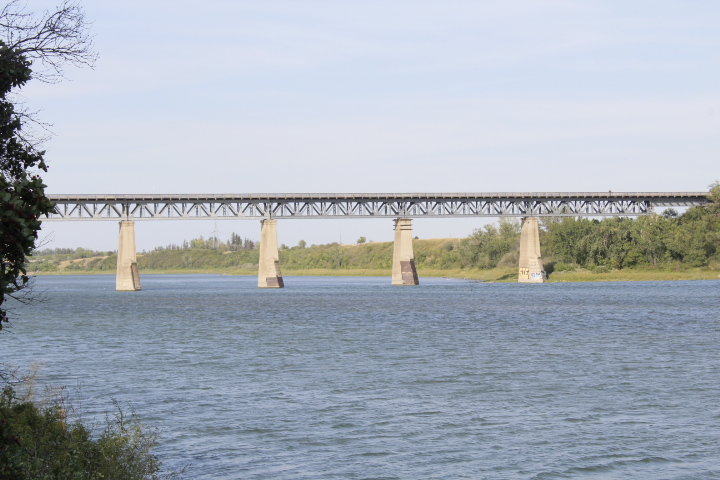

The bridge was built by the Canadian Pacific Railway in 1908 and is referred to by locals as the CPR Bridge or CP Railway Bridge, or simply the Train Bridge or Railway Bridge. The city's second rail bridge, to avoid confusion, is generally known as the Grand Trunk Bridge or CN Railway Bridge; that second bridge opened several months before the CPR Bridge. With the demolition of the city's original Traffic Bridge in 2016 (it was subsequently replaced by a new structure), the CPR Bridge became the second-oldest surviving bridge in the city.

The CPR Bridge is part of the CP rail line to its Sutherland rail yards. It is unusual for a rail bridge in that it includes a pedestrian walkway, which was added in 1909. It allows users to cross between the west side of the bridge, adjacent to the Meewasin Valley trails, and the east side, near Innovation Place Research Park. The bridge stands 19.5 metres (64 ft) above the river.

Originally, the City of Saskatoon asked that the bridge be designed so that a single lane of vehicular traffic could be added later. However, this plan was abandoned and the University Bridge was instead built upstream.

The bridge is referred to on page 1 of Farley Mowat's 1961 novella, Owls in the Family; Mowat refers to the bridge by a variation of its nickname, The Railroad Bridge.

== See also ==
- List of crossings of the South Saskatchewan River
- List of bridges in Canada
