= List of crossings of the South Saskatchewan River =

This is a list of crossings of the South Saskatchewan River in the Canadian provinces of Saskatchewan and Alberta, from the river's confluence with the North Saskatchewan River at Saskatchewan River Forks, upstream to its origin at the confluence of the Bow and Oldman Rivers.

== Saskatchewan ==
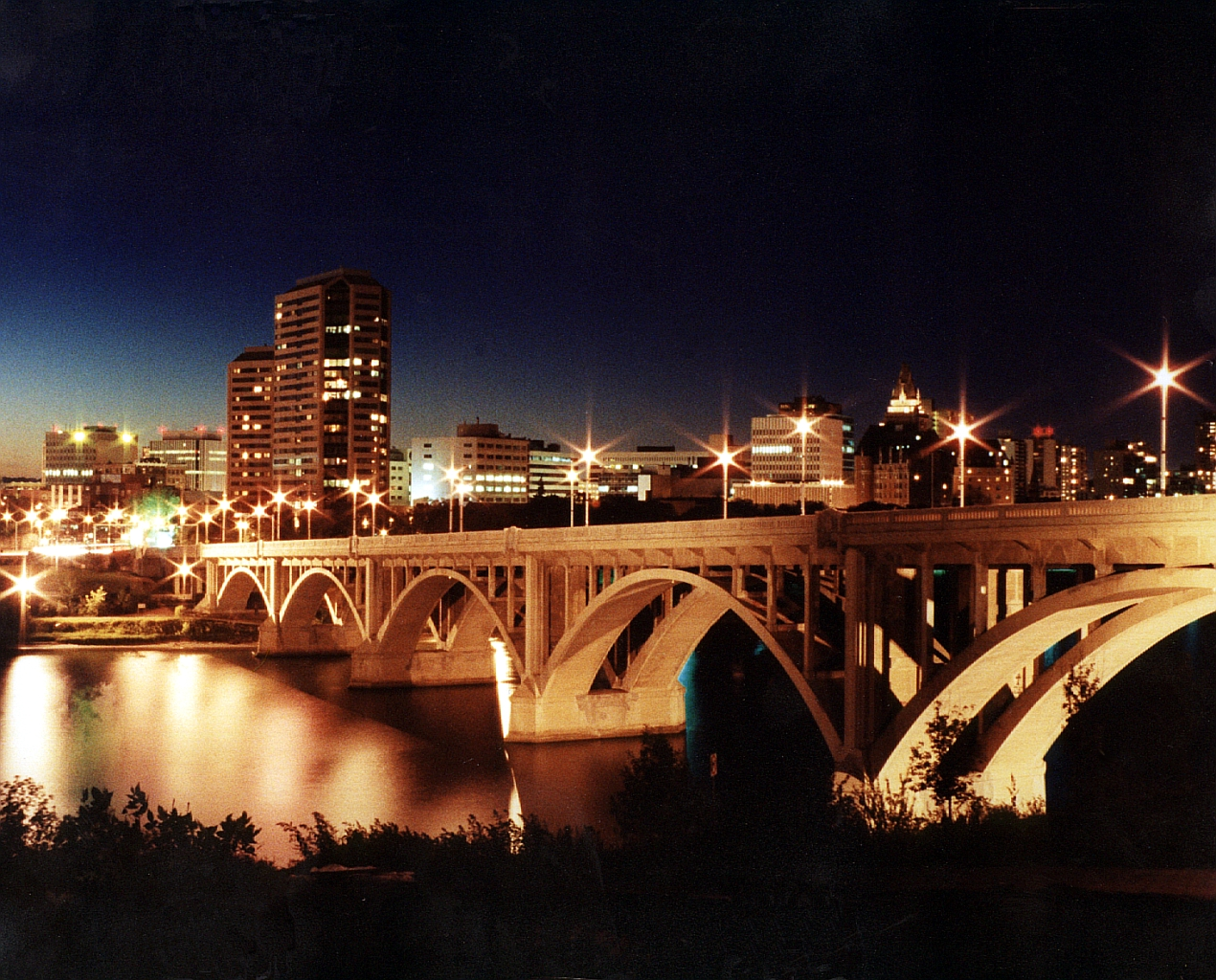
Broadway Bridge

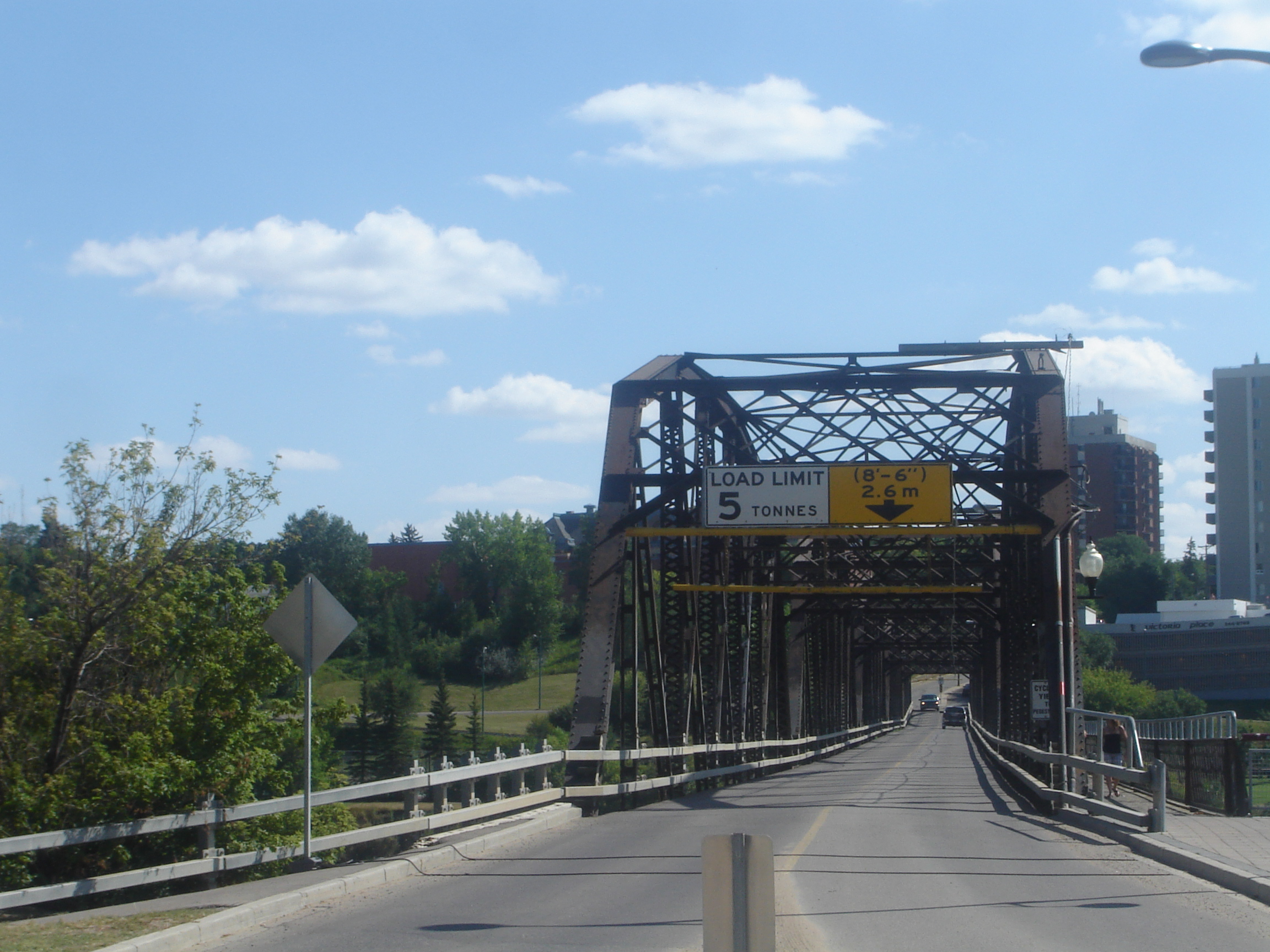
Victoria or Traffic Bridge

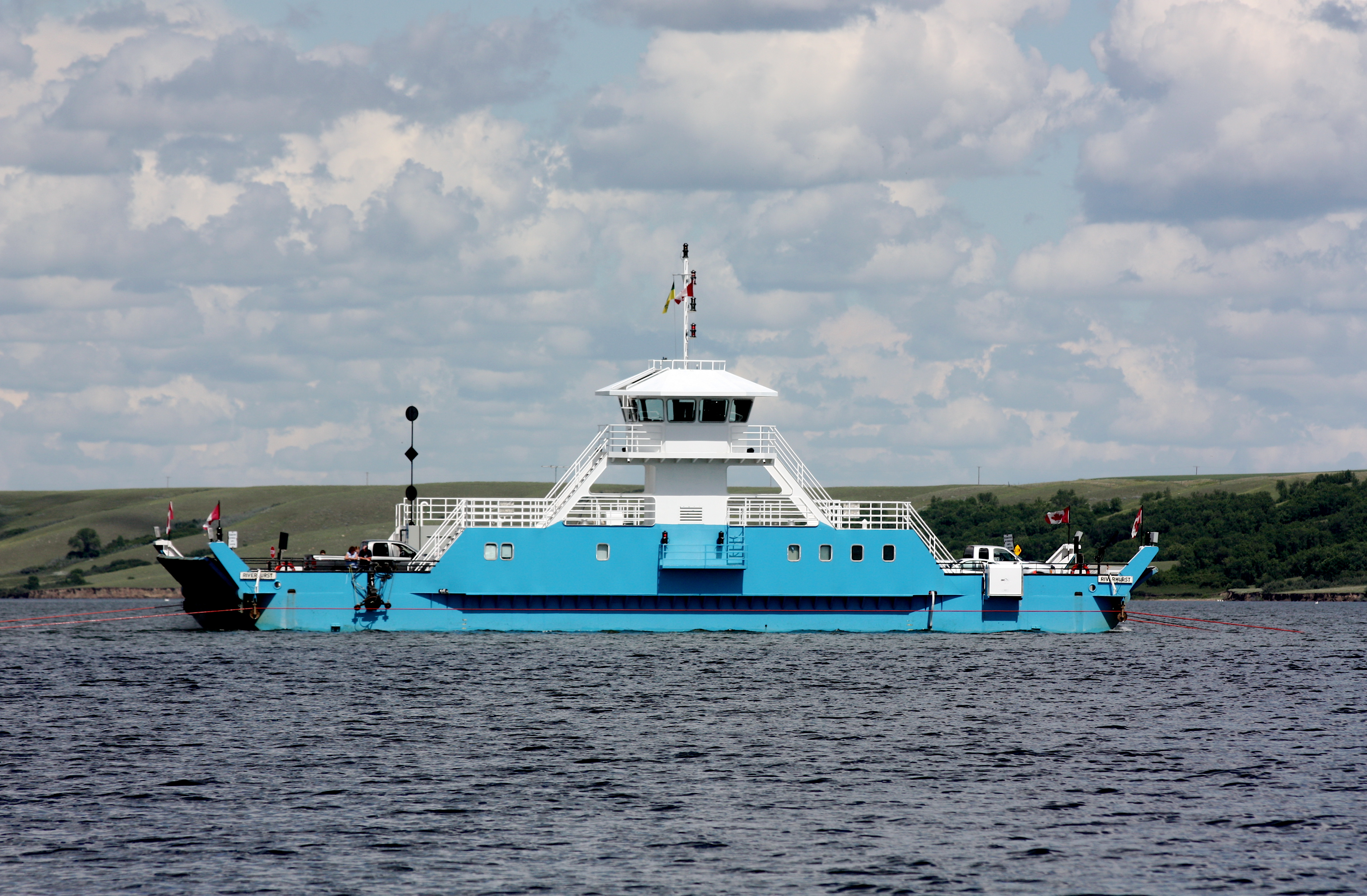
Riverhurst Ferry

Crossing	Carries	Location	Notes	Coordinates
Weldon Ferry	Highway 302 to Grid road 682	north of Weldon	6 car capacity	53.183°N 105.162°W
Muskoday Bridge	Highway 3	west of Muskoday		53.085°N 105.499°W
Fenton Ferry	grid road	north of Fenton	6 car capacity	53.020°N 105.585°W
Railway bridge	Canadian National Railway	north of Fenton		53.024°N 105.598°W
St. Louis Bridge	Highway 2	St. Louis		52.925°N 105.808°W
St. Laurent Ferry	Grid road 783 to Grid road 782	St. Laurent de Grandin	6 car capacity	52.836°N 106.094°W
Gabriel Bridge	Highway 312	south of Batoche		52.668°N 106.123°W
Hague Ferry	Grid road 785	east of Hague	6 car capacity	52.492°N 106.284°W
Clarkboro Ferry	Grid road 784	east of Warman	6 car capacity	52.320°N 106.457°W
Railway bridge	Canadian National Railway	east of Warman		52.304°N 106.464°W
Chief Mistawasis Bridge	Marquis Drive to McOrmond Drive	Saskatoon	4 spans, 6 lanes	52.198°N 106.616°W
Circle Drive Bridge	Circle Drive	Saskatoon	twin spans, 6 lanes	52.153°N 106.634°W
CPR Bridge	Canadian Pacific Railway	Saskatoon		52.143°N 106.641°W
University Bridge	25th Street to College Drive	Saskatoon	4 lanes	52.153°N 106.634°W
Broadway Bridge	4th Avenue to Broadway Avenue	Saskatoon	4 lanes	52.122°N 106.660°W
Traffic Bridge	3rd Avenue to Victoria Avenue	Saskatoon	2 lanes	52.121°N 106.663°W
Senator Sid Buckwold Bridge	Idylwyld Freeway (Highway 11, Highway 16)	Saskatoon	twin spans, 6 lanes	52.121°N 106.669°W
Gordie Howe Bridge	Circle Drive	Saskatoon	6 lanes	52.098°N 106.695°W
Grand Trunk Bridge	Canadian National Railway	Saskatoon		52.097°N 106.696°W
Skytrail	Trans Canada Trail	Outlook	former rail bridge	51.490°N 107.075°W
Outlook Bridge	Highway 15	Outlook		51.475°N 107.080°W
Gardiner Dam	Highway 44	Lake Diefenbaker		51.259°N 106.883°W
Riverhurst Ferry	Highway 42	Lake Diefenbaker	15 car capacity	50.911°N 106.930°W
Saskatchewan Landing Bridge	Highway 4	Lake Diefenbaker		50.654°N 107.968°W
Lancer Ferry	grid road	north of Lancer	6 car capacity	50.984°N 108.881°W
Lemsford Ferry	Highway 649	North of Lemsford	6 car capacity	51.024°N 109.133°W
Chesterfield Bridge	Highway 21	north of Leader		50.971°N 109.529°W
Estuary Ferry	Grid road 635	north of Estuary	6 car capacity	50.945°N 109.803°W

== Alberta ==
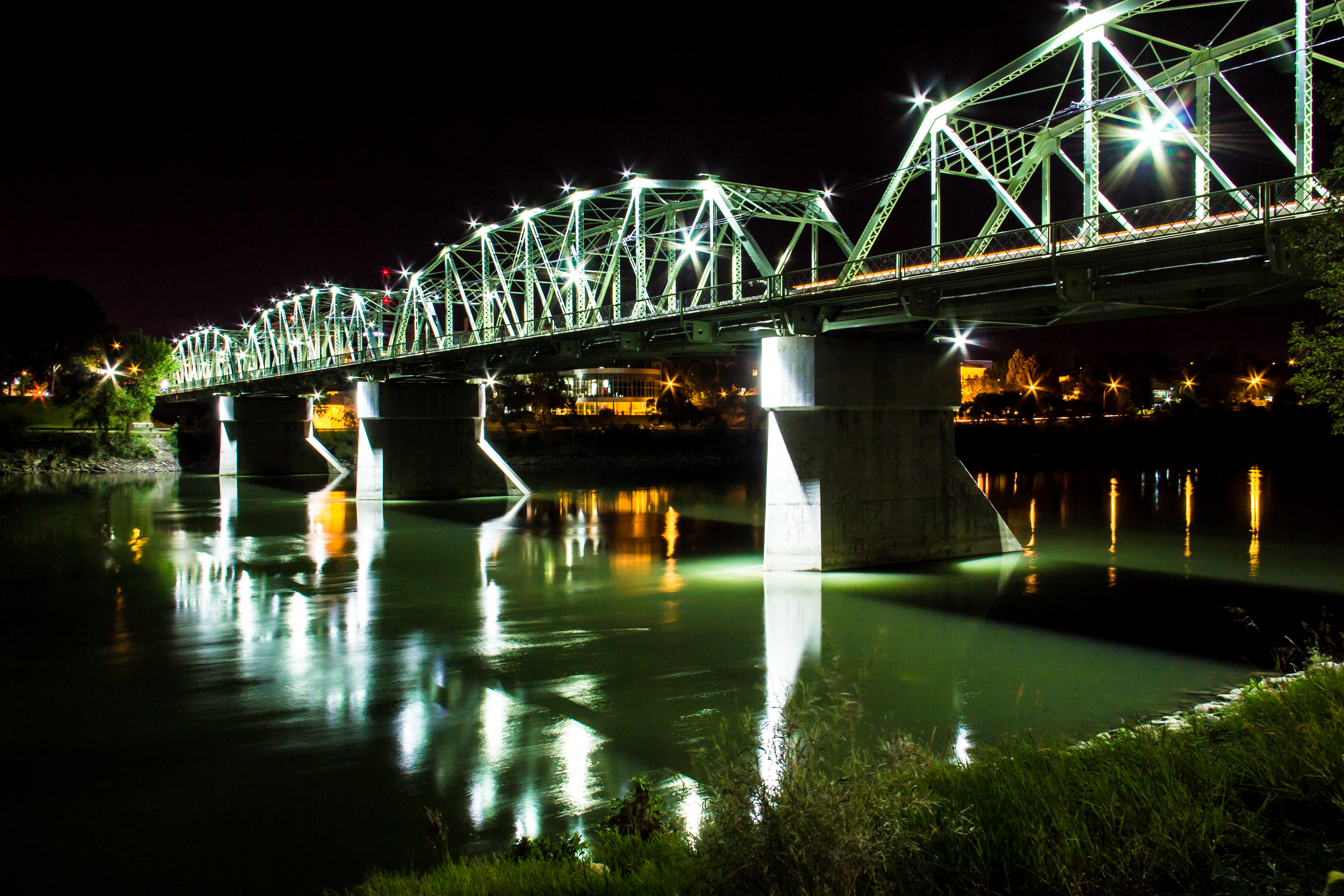
Finley Bridge

Crossing	Carries	Location	Notes	Coordinates
Highway bridge	Highway 41	south of Empress		50.731°N 110.069°W
Maple Avenue Bridge	Altawana Drive NE to Maple Avenue	Medicine Hat		50.045°N 110.674°W
Railway bridge	Canadian Pacific Railway	Medicine Hat		50.044°N 110.676°W
Finlay Bridge	2nd Avenue NE to 6th Avenue SE	Medicine Hat		50.043°N 110.679°W
Highway bridge	Highway 1	Medicine Hat	twin spans	50.044°N 110.719°W
Highway bridge	Highway 879	northwest of Bow Island		49.905°N 111.477°W

== Pipeline bridge ==
The pipeline suspension bridge was erected in 1957 19 kilometres (12 mi) west of Burstall across the South Saskatchewan River.

== Proposed crossings ==
The city of Medicine Hat hosted a public meeting proposing a Sanitary Sewer and Water Pipeline which is intended to cross the South Saskatchewan River.

== See also ==
- List of crossings of the North Saskatchewan River
