= Finlay Bridge =

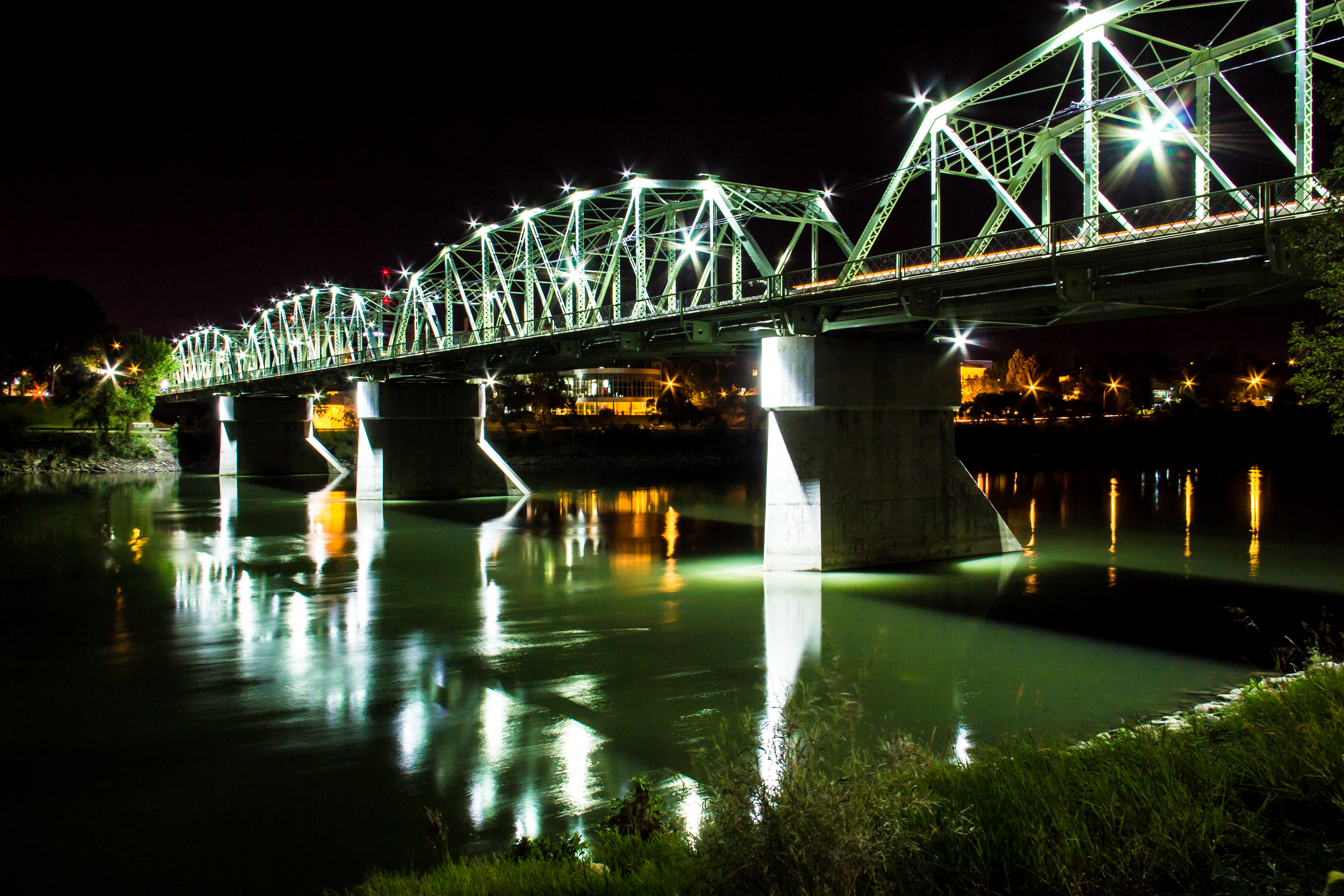
- Finlay Bridge as seen from northern bank on July 31st, 2014
- Coordinates: 50°02′30″N 110°40′39″W
- Carries: Two single lanes of traffic, dual walkways on each side for pedestrians and bicycles
- Crosses: South Saskatchewan River
- Locale: Medicine Hat, Alberta
- Maintained by: City of Medicine Hat

Characteristics
- Design: Truss Bridge
- Total length: 274m (900ft)
- Width: 10m

History
- Designer: Joseph A. Carbert
- Opened: May 14, 1908

Statistics
- Daily traffic: 3,770 (2024)

Location
- Interactive map of Finlay Bridge

Finlay Bridge opened on May 14, 1908, in Medicine Hat, Alberta, by Alberta Premier Alexander Cameron Rutherford. Spanning 274 meters (900 ft) across the South Saskatchewan River, the traffic and pedestrian bridge connects Medicine Hat's north side to the south side. Upon completion it was largest steel bridge in Western Canada and is officially listed on the Alberta Register of Historic Places. It is named after William Thomas Finlay, a local politician who was the most vocal advocate for the bridge's construction.

Prior to Finlay Bridge completion, Medicine Hat residents had to choose between either the CP Rail bridge or a ferry, operated by the North-West Mounted Police, to get from one side of the city to the other. Both were risky options and the ferry route was only open 6 months of the year due to winter freezing.

During the devastating 2013 Southern Alberta floods Finlay Bridge was closed amid fears that flood waters could reach and damage the structure. Medicine Hat was almost "split in two" for the first time in over a hundred years as all major bridges connecting the north to the south were scheduled to be shut down due to the historic flooding of 2013.

== See also ==
- List of crossings of the South Saskatchewan River
