= Senator Sid Buckwold Bridge =

Bridge in Saskatoon, Saskatchewan, Canada

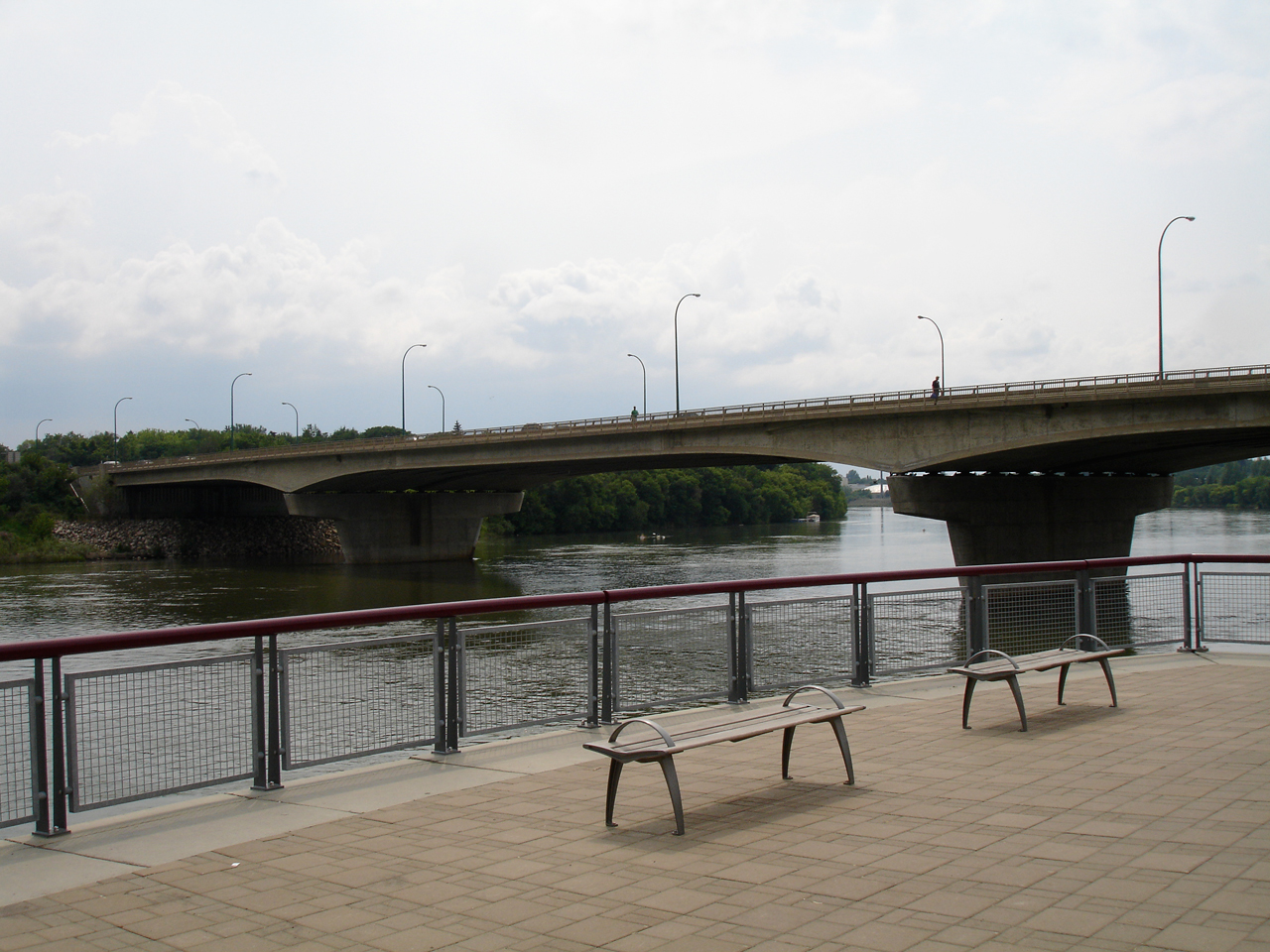
- Senator Sid Buckwold (Idylwyld) Bridge
- Coordinates: 52°07′17″N 106°40′08″W
- Carries: 6 lanes of Idylwyld Drive/Expressway (Hwy 11/Hwy 16)
- Crosses: South Saskatchewan River
- Locale: Saskatoon, Saskatchewan, Canada
- Official name: Senator Sid Buckwold Bridge
- Other name(s): Idylwyld Bridge; Freeway Bridge
- Named for: Sid Buckwold
- Maintained by: City of Saskatoon
- Preceded by: Gordie Howe Bridge
- Followed by: Traffic Bridge

Characteristics
- Material: Reinforced concrete
- No. of spans: 3
- Piers in water: 2

History
- Construction start: February 5, 1965
- Construction end: 1966
- Opened: October 28, 1966

Location
- Interactive map of Senator Sid Buckwold Bridge

The Senator Sid Buckwold Bridge is a bridge that spans the South Saskatchewan River between west and east shore in Saskatoon, Saskatchewan, Canada. It was built in 1966, on the same site as the original Qu'Appelle, Long Lake and Saskatchewan (later CN Rail) bridge. The bridge is part of the Idylwyld Freeway, for which the former CNR Bridge was torn down. The act of dynamiting the original piers of the CNR Bridge became something of a spectacle as demolition experts were unable to completely destroy them. At the time, the new bridge cost $1.5 million to build.

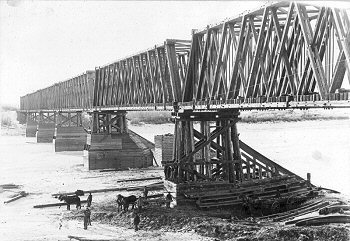
The QLLS Bridge, the first bridge on the site

Construction of the bridge was one of several simultaneous, interconnected major projects that occurred in Saskatoon during the mid-to-late 1960s. Related projects included: the construction of the Midtown Plaza shopping centre and CN Towers office block which followed the demolition of the former CNR Station and the removal of the attending railyard and CNR Bridge; construction of the Saskatoon Centennial Auditorium (now called TCU Place) also on former railway land; and construction of the Idylwyld Freeway itself from 20th Street southwards to just south of Ruth Street where it joined with another late-1960s freeway project, the south east leg of Circle Drive.

Also known by its former name, the Idylwyld Bridge and, by locals, as the Freeway Bridge, the structure was renamed in honor of former mayor and senator Sidney Buckwold in 2001, following Buckwold's death. Buckwold served two non-consecutive terms as mayor between 1958 and 1971, the period of time in which the bridge planning and construction and the nearby inner-city redevelopment took place.

When a major rehabilitation project began on the bridge in 2019, crews discovered that approximately 350 tons of pigeon droppings were stuck to the structure. In addition to removing the droppings, the contractor was ordered to trap and humanely euthanize the 1500 pigeons roosting on the bridge. The plan to euthanize the birds drew criticism from wildlife advocates, and the city later stopped the use of 4-Aminopyridine for pest control. The construction project was completed in September 2020; the work done included repairing and resurfacing the bridge deck, and widening the pedestrian walkways.

== See also ==
- List of crossings of the South Saskatchewan River
- List of bridges in Canada
- List of bridges
