= Circle Drive Bridge =

Bridge in Saskatoon, Saskatchewan, Canada

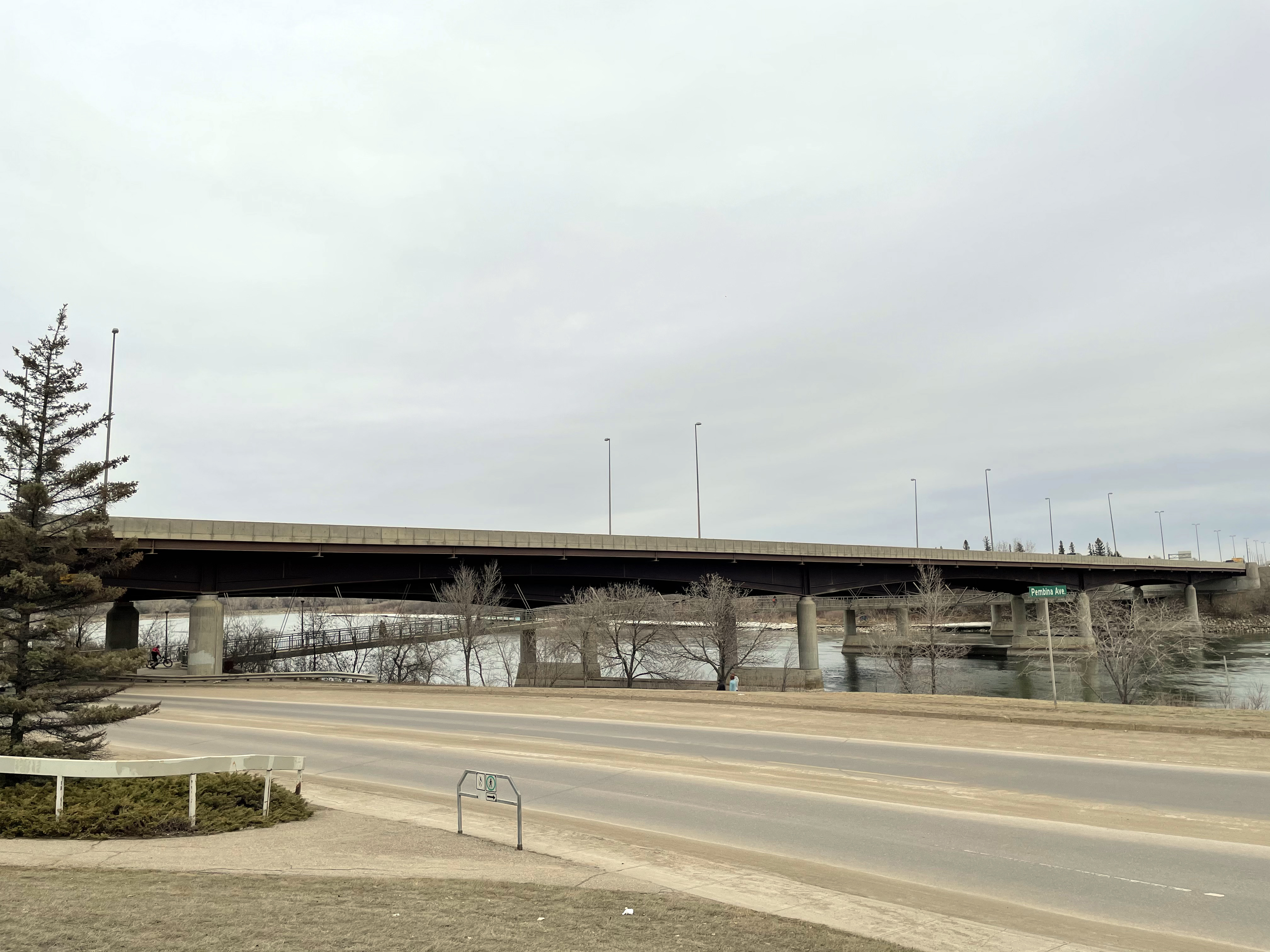
- Circle Drive Bridge
- Coordinates: 52°09′13″N 106°38′05″W
- Carries: 6 lanes of Circle Drive
- Crosses: South Saskatchewan River
- Locale: Saskatoon, Saskatchewan, Canada
- Official name: Circle Drive Bridge
- Maintained by: City of Saskatoon
- Preceded by: CPR Bridge
- Followed by: Chief Mistawasis Bridge

Characteristics
- Design: Girder bridge
- Material: Reinforced concrete, steel
- Total length: 275 metres (902 ft)
- No. of spans: 4
- Piers in water: 3

History
- Opened: Jul 1, 1983 (widening completed September 28, 2007)

Location
- Interactive map of Circle Drive Bridge

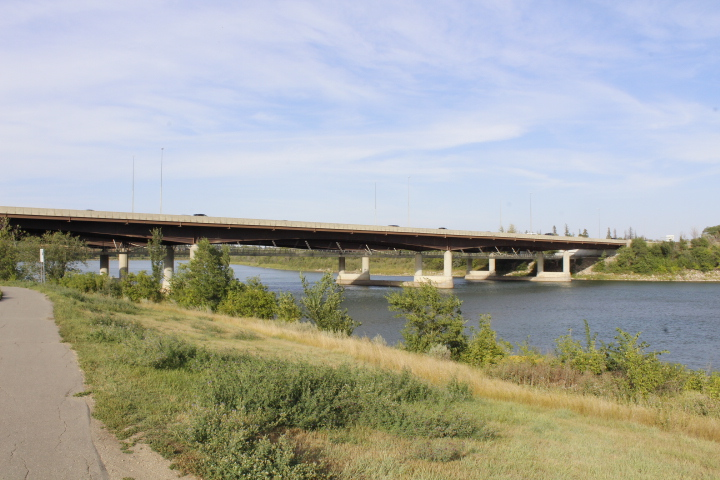

Circle Drive Bridge spans the South Saskatchewan River in Saskatoon, Saskatchewan, Canada. It is a steel girder bridge, built in 1983 as part of the Circle Drive freeway system in northeast Saskatoon. At the time of construction, it cost $11.8 million to build. Between its opening in 1983 and the opening of the Chief Mistawasis Bridge in 2018, it was the northernmost vehicular river crossing in the city.

As with other bridges in the city, locals use several different names for this bridge. During construction there was an unsuccessful campaign to have it named after recently deceased former Prime Minister John Diefenbaker (despite the politician already having a road, a park, a museum and a memorialized street corner named after him). Longtime Saskatonians also refer to it as the 42nd Street Bridge, a reference to a former name of the northern east–west leg of Circle Drive dating back to the 1960s; this name was also commonly applied to the bridge in media coverage and city council references to its planning and construction dating back to the early 1960s. For a brief time in the mid-2010s, it was referred to informally as the Circle Drive North Bridge to differentiate it from the formally-named Circle Drive South Bridge constructed at the opposite end of the city, until the latter bridge was officially renamed the Gordie Howe Bridge.

The Circle Drive Bridge is a twin-span bridge; it was designed so that more lanes could be added by filling in the centre. Early published plans for the bridge called for the addition of an observation deck/interpretive centre to the underside of the bridge at that point. However, rather than widening the bridge by filling in the centre gap, it was deemed to be more cost effective to convert the outside pedestrian walkways into driving lanes. In 2006, construction started on adding a third outside lane in both directions to increase capacity and ease congestion during peak traffic times. The lane additions were completed in 2007. A new pedestrian walkway was built below and between the two bridge structures, and opened in July 2007. The walkway was dedicated as the Stew Uzelman Pedway on October 31, 2009.

The bridge was the scene of a notable accident on 30 December 2013, when Breanna Pegg lost control of her car after hitting ice on the bridge. Her car went over built-up snow along the guard rail, which launched the vehicle up and over the side of the bridge. It crashed onto the frozen river below and started to sink through the broken ice. Pegg escaped the vehicle by kicking out the windshield, standing on top of the car and swimming to a nearby sheet of ice. She then pulled herself onto the ice before being assisted by police and a bystander. As a result of the accident, the city changed its policy regarding snow removal from bridges. The city was sued by Saskatchewan Government Insurance for the cost of the vehicle and its salvage.

== See also ==
- List of crossings of the South Saskatchewan River
- List of bridges in Canada
- Gordie Howe Bridge (Saskatoon)
