= Grand Trunk Bridge (Saskatoon) =

Bridge in Canada

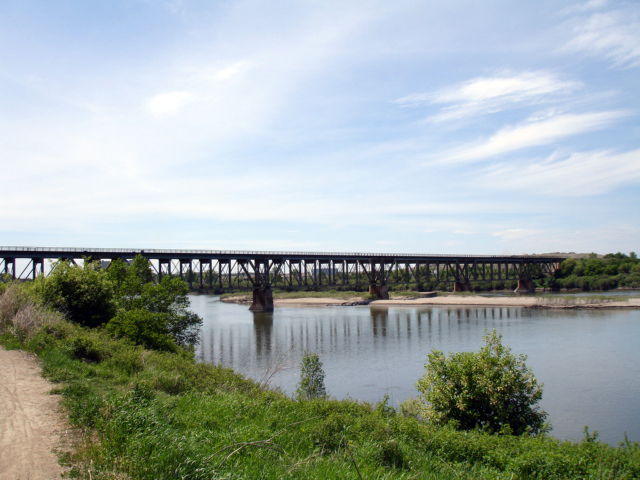
- Grand Trunk Bridge over the South Saskatchewan River
- Coordinates: 52°05′50″N 106°41′46″W
- Carries: Canadian National Railway tracks
- Crosses: South Saskatchewan River
- Locale: Saskatoon, Saskatchewan, Canada
- Official name: Grand Trunk Bridge
- Other name: CN Railway Bridge
- Maintained by: City of Saskatoon
- Preceded by: Gordie Howe Bridge
- Followed by: Outlook Bridge (R.M. of Rudy No. 284)

Characteristics
- Design: Truss bridge
- Material: Steel, concrete

History
- Construction end: 1908
- Opened: March 1908

Location
- Interactive map of Grand Trunk Bridge

The Grand Trunk Bridge is a Canadian steel trestle railway bridge that spans the South Saskatchewan River in Saskatoon, Saskatchewan. It was built in 1908 as part of the Grand Trunk Pacific Railway project. The GTP was merged into the Canadian National Railway (CN) in 1920; as such, the structure is also referred to informally as the CN Railway Bridge.

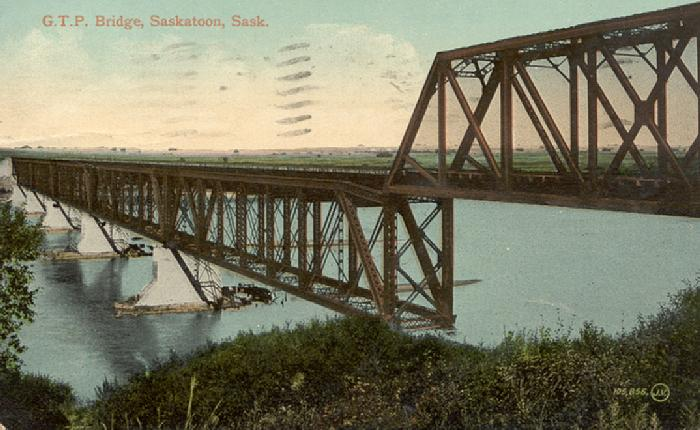
1916 coloured postcard of the Grand Trunk Bridge

The bridge is the southernmost of the city's two rail bridges and is situated between the Queen Elizabeth Power Station on the upstream (west) side and Diefenbaker Park on the downstream (east) side.

CN placed a chain link fence on both sides of the bridge as a result of people trespassing on the walkways. Based upon anecdotal evidence – that is, visual inspection of city maps – it appears to have the longest span of any Saskatoon bridge. The 2012 southwest extension of the city's Circle Drive freeway included the Gordie Howe Bridge, built parallel to the Grand Trunk Bridge.

In 2016, the city's original Traffic Bridge, opened in 1907, was disassembled to make way for a replacement bridge. As of that moment, the Grand Trunk Bridge became Saskatoon's oldest surviving bridge (it opened several months before the city's second rail bridge).

== See also ==
- List of crossings of the South Saskatchewan River
- List of bridges in Canada
