= Chief Mistawasis Bridge =

Bridge in Saskatoon, Saskatchewan, Canada

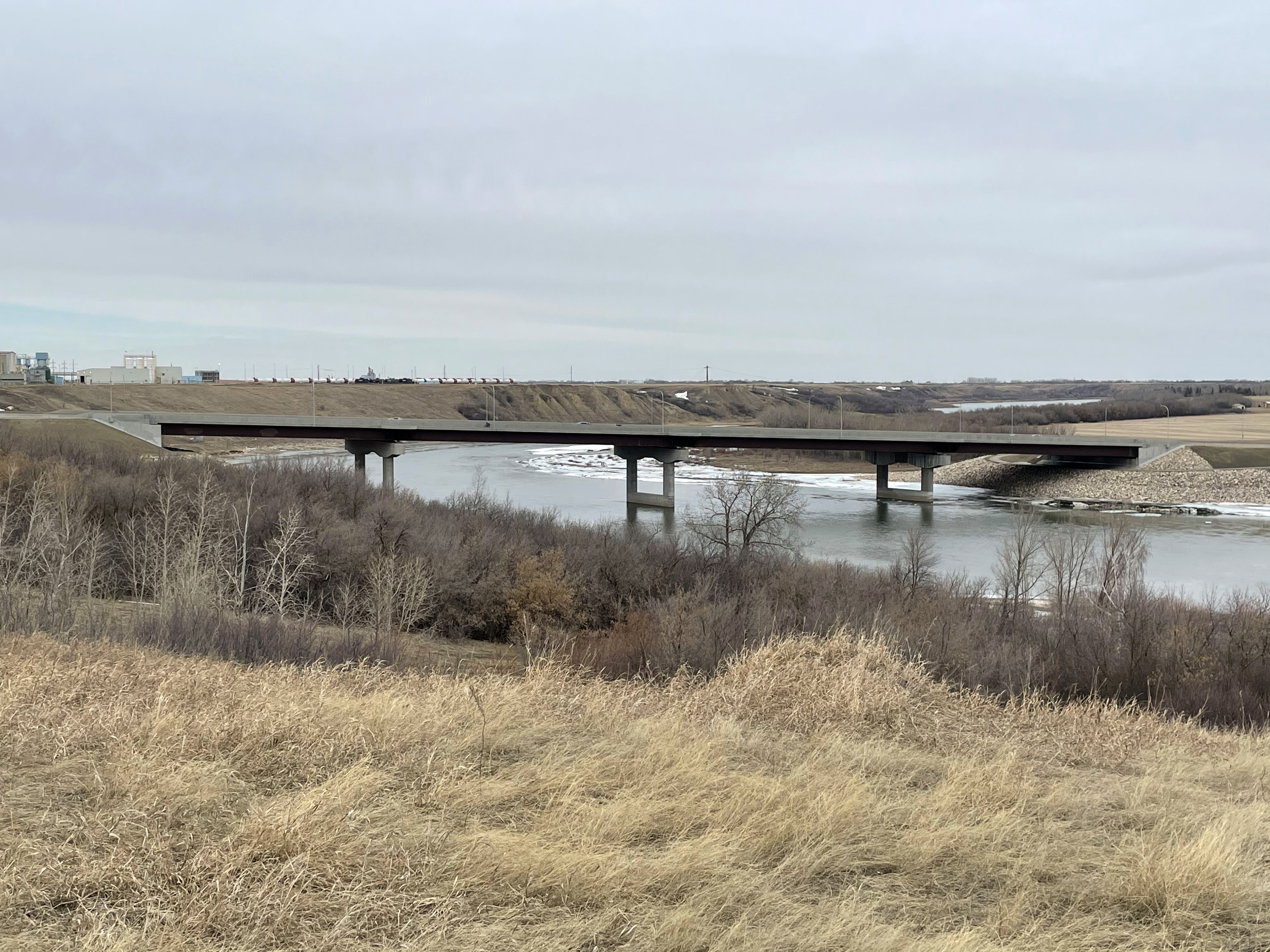
- Chief Mistawasis Bridge as seen from upstream
- Coordinates: 52°11′51″N 106°36′56″W
- Carries: 6 lanes of McOrmond Drive, 2 multi-use paths
- Crosses: South Saskatchewan River
- Locale: Saskatoon, Saskatchewan, Canada
- Other name(s): North Commuter Bridge
- Named for: Mistawasis
- Owner: City of Saskatoon
- Preceded by: Circle Drive Bridge
- Followed by: Clarkboro CNR Bridge (R.M. of Corman Park)

Characteristics
- Design: Girder bridge
- Material: Reinforced concrete, steel
- Total length: 270 metres (890 ft)
- Height: 21.6 metres (71 ft)
- No. of spans: 4
- Piers in water: 3
- No. of lanes: 6

History
- Constructed by: Graham Commuter Partners
- Construction start: Early 2016
- Construction end: October 1, 2018
- Opened: October 2, 2018
- Inaugurated: October 2, 2018

The Chief Mistawasis Bridge (known as the North Commuter Parkway Bridge prior to June 2018) is a girder bridge in Saskatoon, Saskatchewan, Canada. The bridge officially opened on Oct. 2, 2018, and extends McOrmond Drive across the South Saskatchewan River to connect to Marquis Drive, providing a commuter bypass connecting communities on Saskatoon's northeast and eastern sides more directly to industrial and business development on the city's north. Construction of this bridge, located in the northern portion of the city, was financed in concert with construction of replacement for the 1907 Traffic Bridge in the downtown core, which was closed in 2010; that project was opened to traffic on October 3, 2018.

In July 2016 officials announced that, when the bridge was complete, it would be given a name tied to Canada's indigenous peoples. The bridge was officially named the Chief Mistawasis Bridge, in honour of Mistawasis, the head of the Prairie Tribe and signer of Treaty 6 in 1876, at a ceremony on June 21, 2018.

In March of 2017 CBC News described how a berm constructed in the river bed, to channel water around where the bridge's piers were being built was providing an opportunity for urban surfers. Officials warned thrill-seekers that construction made the water near the bridge extra hazardous.

With its bridge-deck 21.6 metres (71 ft) above the river, it is Saskatoon's second highest bridge.

== See also ==
- List of crossings of the South Saskatchewan River
- List of bridges in Canada
