= Broadway Bridge (Saskatoon) =

Bridge in Saskatoon, Saskatchewan, Canada

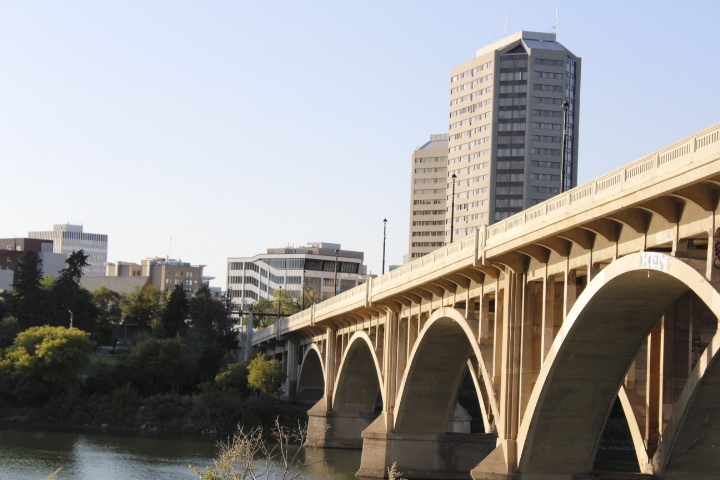
- Broadway Bridge over the South Saskatchewan River
- Coordinates: 52°07′20″N 106°39′35″W
- Carries: 4 lanes of Broadway Avenue/4th Avenue South
- Crosses: South Saskatchewan River
- Locale: Saskatoon, Saskatchewan, Canada
- Official name: Broadway Bridge
- Maintained by: City of Saskatoon
- Preceded by: Traffic Bridge
- Followed by: University Bridge

Characteristics
- Design: Open spandrel deck arch
- Material: Reinforced concrete
- Total length: 355.2 metres (1,165 ft)
- Width: 13.7 metres (45 ft)
- Height: 24 metres (79 ft)
- Piers in water: 4

History
- Designer: Chalmers Jack (C. J.) MacKenzie
- Opened: November 11, 1932

Location
- Interactive map of Broadway Bridge

Broadway Bridge is an arch bridge that spans the South Saskatchewan River in Saskatoon, Saskatchewan, Canada.

== History ==
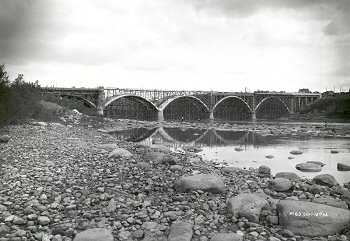
Broadway Bridge under construction, 1931–1932

The bridge was constructed as a "make-work" project during the Great Depression. It was built in 1932 by the contractor R.J. Arrand Construction Co. It was designed by Chalmers Jack (C. J.) MacKenzie (on leave from his post as Dean of Engineering at the University of Saskatchewan). For this reason, the bridge was originally called The Dean's Bridge in its early period; it was formally named the Broadway Bridge as it connects Broadway Avenue on the east shore with 19th Street and 4th Avenue in Saskatoon's downtown core. The city once considered changing the name to George V Bridge in honour of the King.

Construction of the bridge employed 1,593 men, who worked in three shifts around the clock. It is Saskatoon's steepest bridge, with a 4% grade, and the tallest at 24 metres (79 ft) above the river. The total cost at the time of construction was $850,000 CAD. In 1933, the streetcar lines of the Saskatoon Municipal Railway were re-routed from the Traffic Bridge to the Broadway Bridge.

The year-long closure of the nearby Traffic Bridge in late 2005 greatly increased the amount of daily traffic crossing the bridge. The bridge was subsequently closed permanently, leaving the Broadway Bridge as a long-term alternative route until the replacement Traffic Bridge was opened in 2018.

== In popular culture ==
The Broadway Bridge is mentioned in Joni Mitchell's song "Cherokee Louise" on the album Night Ride Home. Joni spent part of her childhood and teenage years in Saskatoon. The Bessborough Hotel, iconically associated with the Broadway Bridge, can be seen in a self-portrait by Mitchell on the cover of her Clouds album.

== See also ==
- List of crossings of the South Saskatchewan River
- List of bridges in Canada
- List of bridges
