= Circle Drive =

Road in Saskatoon, Saskatchewan

Circle Drive
- Circle Drive highlighted in red

Route information
- Maintained by City of Saskatoon
- Length: 26.8 km (16.7 mi)
- Existed: 1961–present
- Component highways: Highway 11 / Highway 16 (TCH)

Major junctions
- Orbital around Saskatoon
- Highway 5 Highway 11; Highway 12; Highway 7 Highway 14; Highway 16 (TCH/YH)

Location
- Country: Canada
- Province: Saskatchewan

Highway system
- Provincial highways in Saskatchewan
← Highway 10	→ Highway 12
← Highway 15	→ Highway 16A

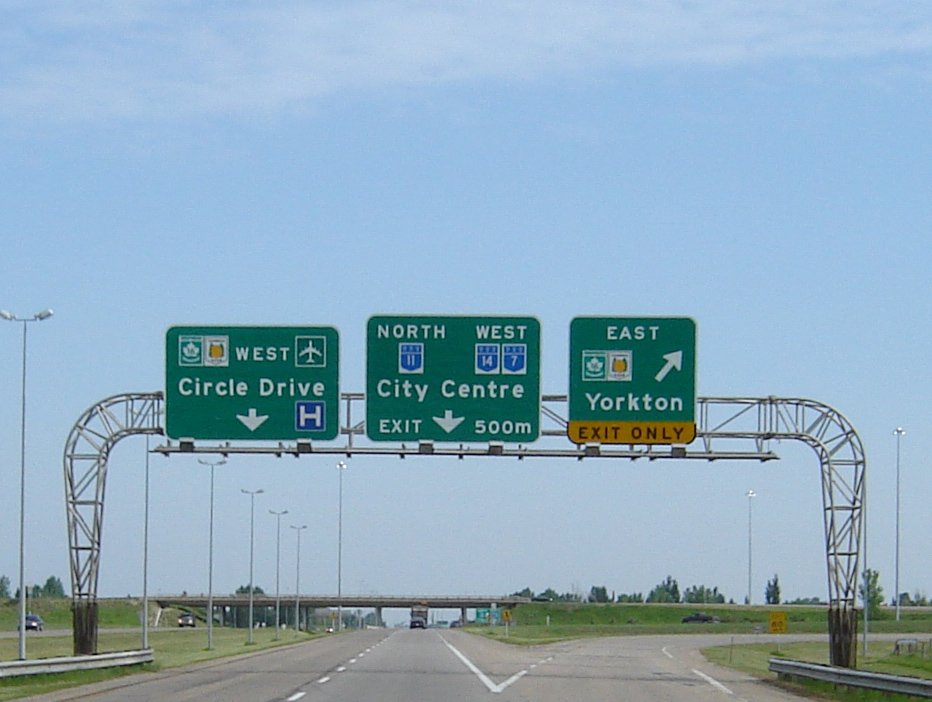
Circle Drive entrance from northbound Highway 11

Circle Drive is a major road constructed as a ring road in Saskatoon, Saskatchewan, Canada. It was first conceived in 1913 by the city commissioner and completed exactly 100 years later in 2013. Most of the route is a fully-controlled access freeway, however the segment between Airport Drive and Millar Avenue has at-grade intersections.

Its route signed as both part of Highway 16 (Trans-Canada/Yellowhead Highway) and Highway 11, with both being cosigned along the entire length. Officially, Highway 16 follows the eastern half of Circle Drive between the cloverleaf interchange at its southeastern extremity and Idylwyld Drive; while Highway 11 follows the southern portion of Circle Drive between the cloverleaf interchange and the Idylwyld Drive (Idylwyld Freeway) before continuing north through Downtown Saskatoon.

== History ==
Construction of a ring road in Saskatoon was first proposed in 1913 by city commissioner Christopher J. Yorath. He conceived the first comprehensive town plan, which included inner and outer "encircling boulevards". Parts of the present-day roadway follow the course Yorath laid out, though some route proposals were rejected, such as one for the southern leg that would have taken the roadway over an island south of present-day Saskatoon that, years later, was named in honour of Yorath. It wasn't until the 1950s as the city expanded outward that the present roadway corridor was established. The proposed road was officially named "Circle Drive" at a special city council session on May 4, 1959, and by the fall of 1960 a route had been formalized which planners mostly adhered to for the remainder of the project. Construction funding, originally estimated at $10 million, was allotted and construction began in 1961.

Rather than the complete route being built at once, Circle Drive was built in sections, as required by traffic conditions and allowed by available funding. As a result, it would take 52 years for the project to be completed.

The first sections to be built were a northwest segment between Warman Road and 11th Street West, which initially included only a single interchange at Idylwyld Drive (formerly known as Avenue A); some of the route made use of a previously existing arterial commercial road, 42nd Street (as a result, the stretch of Circle Drive between Avenue C and Millar Avenue is often referred to as 42nd Street, and businesses fronting the roadway continued to use 42nd Street as their street address well into the 1970s), and most of Dundonald Avenue, a street that followed the western edge of the city, was removed to make way for the freeway. The southeast segment, from Lorne Avenue to College Drive, was constructed concurrently with the Idylwyld Freeway, a connector from Circle Drive into the downtown core. Not including the Idylwyld Freeway, only two interchanges were initially built on the southeast leg: a limited-access one at 14th Street, and a large cloverleaf interchange at the junction of the realigned Highways 16 and 11. The first portion of the southeast leg to be built was from 8th Street south to the city limits where it met a realigned Highway 11. In lieu of an interchange at 8th Street, a large traffic circle or roundabout was constructed.

=== 1983 extension and north bridge ===
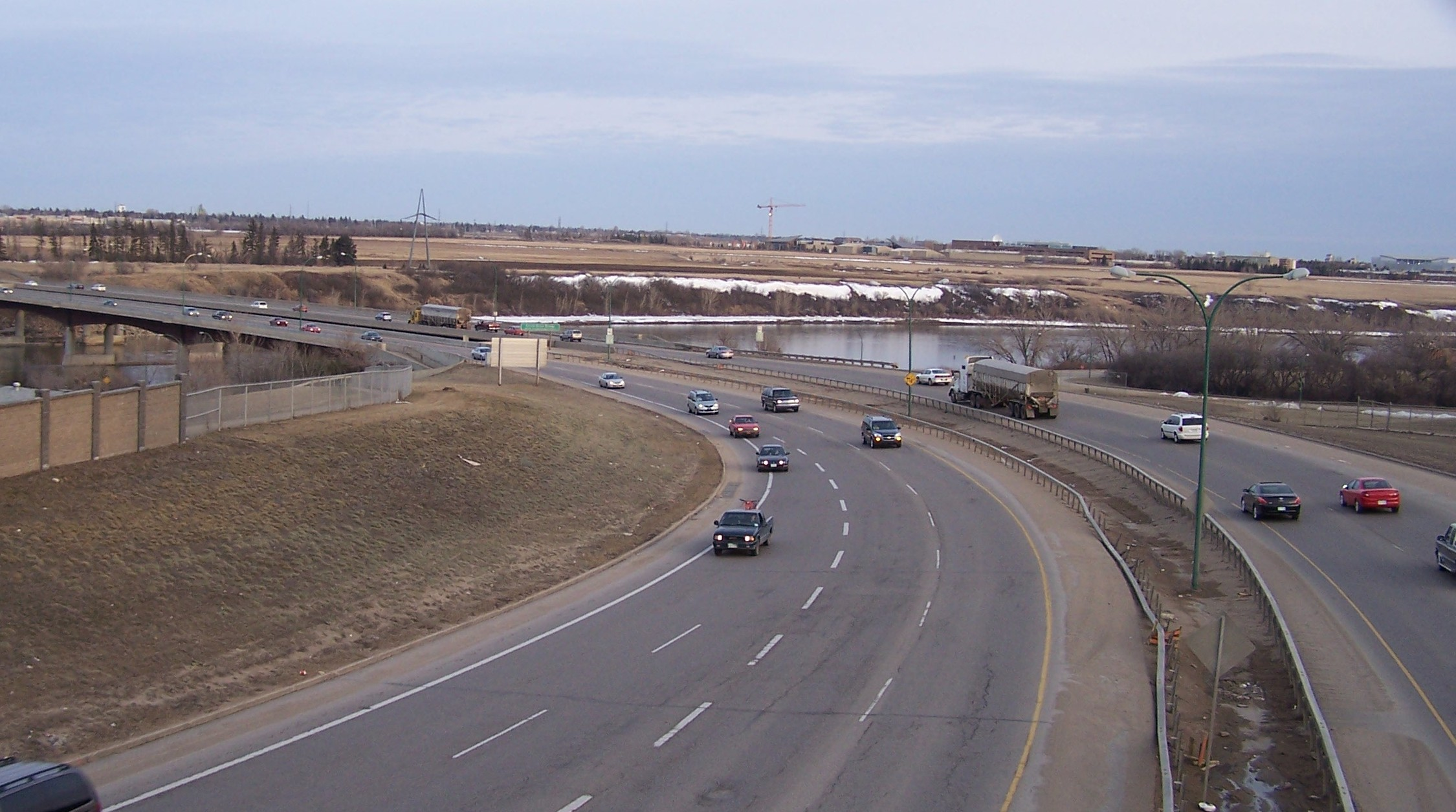
Circle Drive approaching the Circle Drive North Bridge

For close to 15 years, the two sections of Circle Drive sat apart, with discussions regarding the third phase continuing through the 1970s. The next portion of the roadway completed was the northeast quadrant, from College Drive to Warman Road, connecting the two extant sections. This included the construction of the Circle Drive Bridge (aka the North Bridge and initially referred to as the 42nd Street Bridge) across the South Saskatchewan River and was completed in 1983 after several years of construction.

The original project involved interchanges at Warman Road and 108th Street; over the next 20 years additional interchanges were constructed at Attridge Drive/Preston Avenue North and College Drive. Also during the 1980s, the northwest leg of Circle Drive added an interchange at 33rd Street, while the 8th Street traffic circle in the southeast was removed after years of complaints and accidents, and in the late 1990s an interchange was constructed as a replacement. Also in 1996 an interchange was added at Taylor Street's junction with Circle Drive. Some infrastructure work planned to go with the northeast leg of Circle Drive, including the closure of Central Avenue's connection to College Drive, removal of the Circle Drive/14th Street interchange and a proposed interchange at Preston Avenue and College Drive, was never undertaken.

A few years after its completion, the northeast extension was designated the through route for the Yellowhead Highway, replacing the previous route through downtown along Idylwyld Drive.

In 2002, a major interchange was added where Circle Drive intersected several major roads: 22nd Street West, Fairlight Drive and Confederation Drive, replacing a complex series of traffic lights. Also, partially in preparation for the extension of the freeway (as well as residential and commercial development), an interchange at Clarence Avenue South was added in the late 2000s.

=== 2013 extension and south bridge ===
The last remaining southwest section of Circle Drive, between 11th Street West and Lorne Avenue, including the Gordie Howe Bridge (originally called the Circle Drive South Bridge) and running parallel to the Grand Trunk Bridge, opened to traffic on July 31, 2013, after several years of construction and a rain- and water table-induced delay of nearly a year. Approximately 7 km in length, it connects the C.N. Industrial area to the Holiday Park neighbourhood, travelling through property annexed from the Saskatoon Golf and Country Club.

The bridge has six traffic lanes and a pedestrian walkway suspended underneath, similar to the north bridge. National and provincial funding each amounted to $172 million and the city of Saskatoon committed $70.5 million towards the project. The total cost of the project is estimated at $272.5 million.

The city of Saskatoon hired a private contractor to build the bridge. Three companies submitted proposals: PCL Construction, Peter Kiewet Sons and Graham Construction/Flatiron. The Graham/Flatiron bid was selected on March 29, 2010. Construction of the bridge and associated roadways was expected to be complete by September 30, 2012. However, record rainfall, high water tables and an early snowfall made that deadline unfeasible, and the roadway ultimately did not open until July 31, 2013.

Environment Canada and Fisheries and Ocean oversaw environmental impacts on the river. The project included four new interchanges: at 11th Street West (which utilizes some of the land area given up by the Maple Leaf Foods building demolition in 2010), and at Secondary Highway 762 (Valley Road) on the west side of the river, and interchanges at Highway 219 (Lorne Avenue) and the Idylwyld Freeway. In the later stages of construction, construction began on an interchange along the older southeast section of Circle Drive at its intersection with Preston Avenue South; this was completed several months after the southwest extension and technically marked the completion of the Circle Drive project.

The Holiday Park golf course needed to re-landscape two holes on the golf course, as holes 6 and 7 were affected. The southwest and southern periphery of Diefenbaker Park was also impacted as that portion of the park was taken over by the freeway. Some roadways in Montgomery Place and Holiday Park Industrial were also realigned and the at-grade intersection at Circle and Clancy Drive was also revised. Another impact of the project is a new rail switching yard near 11th Street and Dundonald Avenue. In 2010, the city of Saskatoon signed a non-binding agreement in principle with the Canadian National Railway and Canadian Pacific Railway to move railcar switching out of the downtown Central Industrial neighbourhood.

Additional road revisions were required as part of the project: 11th Street West, westbound from the new interchange with Circle, was replaced with the 11th Street West Bypass, aligned further north from the original road, which was converted into a cul-de-sac; this, in turn, opened up space for new multi-family residential development in the mature Montgomery Place community. Several streets within the South West Industrial and C.N. Industrial subdivisions were also realigned or shortened. The portion of Dundonald Avenue between Mountbatten Street and Valley Road was designated for closure; this required the construction of a new access road off Valley Road connecting to the city landfill while Valley Road itself was realigned to connect directly with Circle Drive (previously it had linked with Dundonald Avenue). Development of the Circle Drive/Valley Ridge interchange also required the permanent closure of the Fletcher Road access point into South West Industrial via Dundonald, leading to city planners adding a new roadway, Dawes Avenue, to provide an extra access to 11th Street and, in turn, Circle Drive.

The first portion of the southwest extension to open was 11th Street to Valley Road, which was open by late spring of 2013.

== Future development ==
Although the circle is now "closed", Saskatoon is investigating future improvements to older parts of the freeway, including revisions to the aged Idylwyld Drive North/Circle Drive interchange and finding ways to deal with traffic congestion along the non-freeway "42nd Street" (Warman Road to Avenue C) section of the road. As of October 2013 the city's Projected Growth Concept Plan map shows a proposed interchange at Airport Drive. There remain two further seagull intersections along the western freeway portion of Circle Drive at Laurier Drive and Clancy Drive that the city is looking to redevelop in the future in order to create "freeflow" conditions along the non-42nd Street portion of the road; the same long-term plan also calls for revision to the complicated interchange at 22nd Street and Circle Drive (and adjacent roadways).

In February 2018, Saskatoon announced preliminary plans to replace the aging cloverleaf interchange where Circle Drive intersects Highway 11 and 16 in the southeast corner of the city. With an estimated cost of $280 million, work on the upgrade is not expected to begin until the late 2020s or early 2030s.

A new Saskatoon Freeway is (as of 2022) in the planning phase. Located on the current development periphery of Saskatoon (much as Circle Drive initially was when construction on it began in the 1960s), it is expected to relieve pressure on Circle by allowing a city bypass. However, planning documents for the freeway show there are no plans for a southwest section of the road (between Highway 7 and Highway 11), as the new southwest portion of Circle Drive is expected to handle this traffic for the foreseeable future.

== Interchanges ==
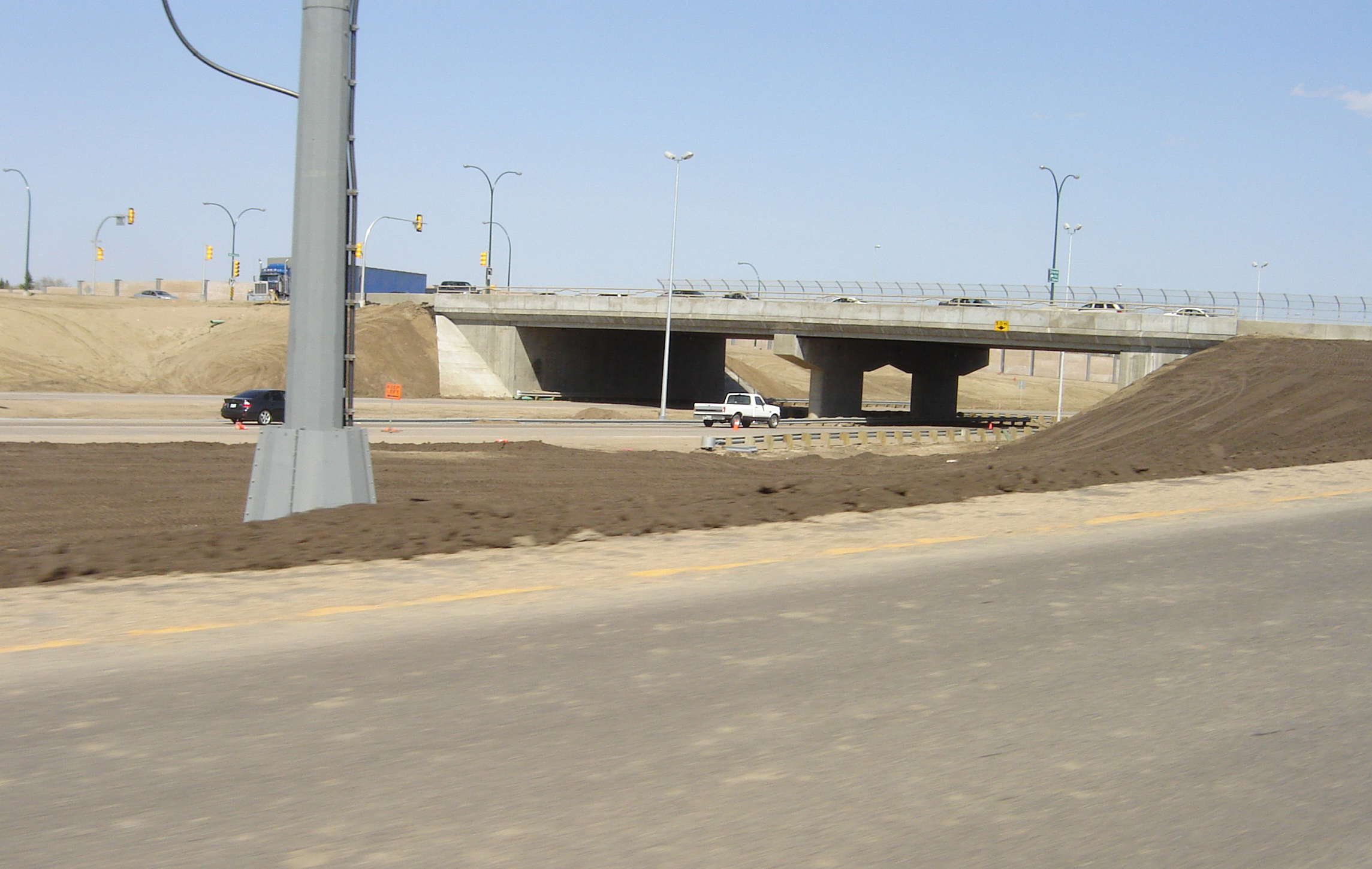
Clarence Avenue/Circle Drive interchange

As of 2004, the Circle Drive Bridge portion of the road was carrying up to 50,000 vehicles per day, more than twice the volume from when it opened. Due to the greatly increased traffic the bridge was significantly expanded in 2007. Over the years, a number of at-grade intersections were converted to grade-separated interchanges to improve traffic flow. They include:

- Idylwyld Drive North (formerly known as Avenue A) – 1960s
- 33rd Street – November 10, 1980 (expanded in summer 1992)
- Warman Road – July 1, 1983 (coinciding with the opening of Circle Drive Bridge)
- Taylor Street – September 16, 1996
- 8th Street – October 31, 1999 – initially constructed as a large traffic circle in the late 1960s, this traffic control device proved unpopular and was replaced with a split intersection in the mid-1980s, and ultimately an interchange in 1999.
- Attridge Drive/Preston Avenue North – October 1, 2001
- 22nd Street/Confederation Drive/Fairlight Drive – October 28, 2002
- College Drive – October 4, 2006
- Clarence Avenue – November 20, 2007
- Preston Avenue – Completed in autumn of 2013

There are also purpose-built half-diamond interchanges at 14th Street East and 108th Street, and a cloverleaf interchange at highways 11 and 16. Between Millar Avenue and Avenue C North, Circle Drive downgrades from a freeway to an arterial road, with regular signalized intersections and driveway-accessed businesses. Additional at-grade intersections are located at Circle Place (no signals, eastbound access only), Airport Drive (signals; north-eastbound traffic free-flow), Laurier Drive (signals; northbound traffic free-flow), and Clancy Drive (signals, northbound traffic free-flow). A short spur of Circle Drive between the Idylwyld Freeway and Lorne Avenue formerly included a T-intersection at Lorne and at-grade intersections at Jasper Avenue and Melville Street, but these were removed as part of the southwest construction (see below).

As noted above, the junction of 8th Street and Circle Drive was originally, in the late 1960s, constructed as a large roundabout dubbed the "Traffic Circle". The first such construction of its kind in Saskatchewan, motorists found it difficult to navigate, leading to local media airing advisories on how to use it. The site of many accidents over the years, and dubbed the most accident-prone location in the city, the circle was ultimately dismantled in the 1980s and replaced with a split at-grade intersection in anticipation for a standard diamond interchange that was constructed in the 1990s.

== Exits and intersections ==
This is a list of present exits and intersections on Circle Drive, beginning clockwise from the Highway 11 / Highway 16 interchange in southeast Saskatoon. The entire route is in Saskatoon.

km	mi	Destinations	Notes
0.0	0.0	Highway 16 (TCH/YH) east (Yellowhead Highway) – Yorkton Highway 11 south (Louis Riel Trail) / Circle Drive north (Highway 11 north / Highway 16 west) – Regina	Cloverleaf interchange; east end Highway 11 concurrency (official designation); roadway continues as Highway 16 east
1.2	0.75	Preston Avenue	Diamond interchange
2.9	1.8	Clarence Avenue	Diamond interchange
4.0	2.5	Idylwyld Drive (Highway 11 north) – City Centre	Flyover interchange; no eastbound exit; west end Highway 11 concurrency (official designation)
4.6	2.9	Lorne Avenue (Highway 219 south) – City Centre	Partial cloverleaf interchange; eastbound access to Idylwyld Freeway; no eastbound entrance
6.4	4.0	Gordie Howe Bridge over South Saskatchewan River	
7.9	4.9	Valley Road (Highway 762 south)	Trumpet interchange
9.1	5.7	11th Street	Partial cloverleaf interchange
10.0	6.2	Clancy Drive	Seagull intersection; northbound freeflow
10.8	6.7	22nd Street / Highway 7 / Highway 14 / Confederation Drive – City Centre	Spaghetti Junction; to St. Paul's Hospital
10.8	6.7	Fairmont Drive	Southbound exit only
11.4	7.1	Laurier Drive (alternate route to Confederation Drive)	Seagull intersection; northbound freeflow
13.0	8.1	33rd Street	Diamond interchange
14.8	9.2	Airport Drive – Airport	Seagull intersection; northbound freeflow
15.2	9.4	Circle Place	Eastbound Right-in/right-out
Freeway ends; becomes major arterial road (former 42nd Street)
15.5	9.6	Avenue C N	Traffic signals
15.7	9.8	Idylwyld Drive / Highway 11 / Highway 16 (TCH/YH) west to Highway 12 north – City Centre	Diamond interchange, traffic signals; north end Highway 16 concurrency (official designation)
15.9	9.9	Northridge Drive / Alberta Avenue	Traffic signals
16.1	10.0	Faithfull Avenue	Traffic signals
16.2	10.1	Quebec Avenue	Traffic signals
16.4	10.2	1st Avenue N	Traffic signals
16.6	10.3	Shopping centre access	Traffic signals
17.0	10.6	Millar Avenue / Venture Crescent	Traffic signals
Freeway resumes
17.3	10.7	Warman Road – City Centre	Parclo AB4 interchange
18.4	11.4	Circle Drive Bridge over South Saskatchewan River	
19.0	11.8	Old Preston Avenue	Eastbound exit only; signed as Preston Avenue
19.9	12.4	Preston Avenue / Attridge Drive	Parclo B4 interchange; Circle Drive turns south
21.4	13.3	108th Street	Half diamond interchange; northbound entrance (including second NB access from Lanyon Avenue) and southbound exit
22.3	13.9	College Drive (Highway 5) to Highway 41 – City Centre, University of Saskatchewan	Parclo B4 interchange; to Royal University Hospital
23.2	14.4	14th Street	Half diamond interchange; northbound entrance and southbound exit
24.0	14.9	8th Street	Diamond interchange; northbound ramp access into The Centre shopping mall
25.1	15.6	Taylor Street	Diamond interchange
26.8	16.7	Highway 16 (TCH/YH) east / Circle Drive west (Highway 11 north / Highway 16 west) – Yorkton, City Centre Highway 11 south (Louis Riel Trail) – Regina	Cloverleaf interchange; south end Highway 16 concurrency (official designation); roadway continues Highway 11 south
1.000 mi = 1.609 km; 1.000 km = 0.621 mi: Concurrency terminus; Incomplete access; Route transition
