= Gordie Howe Bridge (Saskatoon) =

Bridge in Saskatchewan, Canada

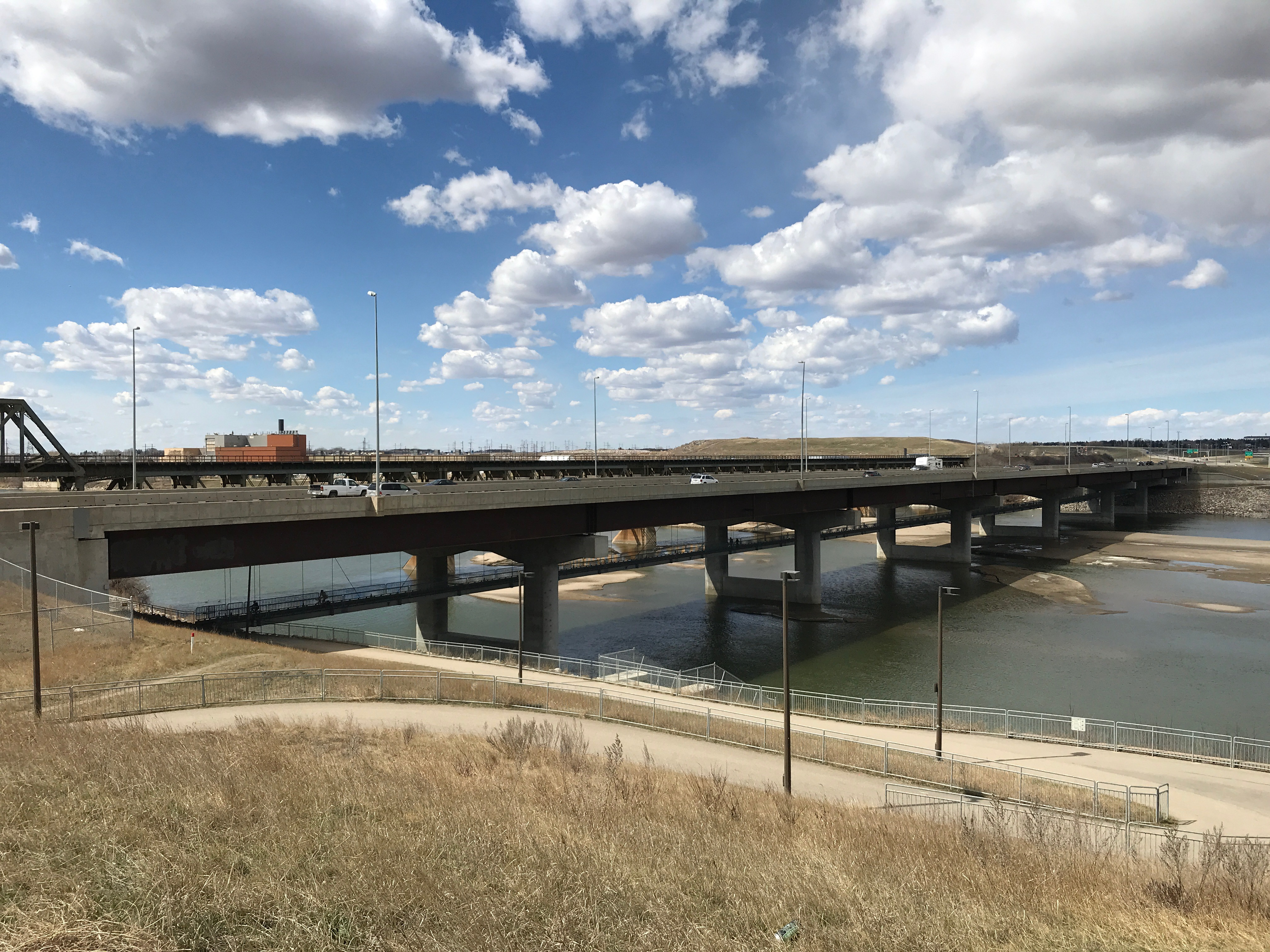
- Gordie Howe Bridge (2019)
- Coordinates: 52°05′51″N 106°41′43″W
- Carries: 6 lanes of Circle Drive
- Crosses: South Saskatchewan River
- Locale: Saskatoon, Saskatchewan, Canada
- Official name: Gordie Howe Bridge
- Named for: Gordie Howe
- Maintained by: City of Saskatoon
- Preceded by: Grand Trunk Bridge
- Followed by: Senator Sid Buckwold Bridge

Characteristics
- Design: Girder bridge
- Material: Reinforced concrete, steel
- Total length: 440 metres (1,440 ft)
- Piers in water: 6

History
- Constructed by: Graham-Flatiron
- Construction start: March 29, 2010
- Opened: July 31, 2013

Location
- Interactive map of Gordie Howe Bridge

The Gordie Howe Bridge is a vehicular freeway bridge that spans the South Saskatchewan River in Saskatoon, Saskatchewan, Canada. It is a steel girder bridge, built as part of the Circle Drive freeway system in southwestern Saskatoon. At the time of construction, it was projected to cost $272.5 million to build. It is the southernmost road bridge in the city. The bridge is located adjacent to the Grand Trunk Bridge. It is also the longest of Saskatoon's bridges at 440 metres (1,440 ft) in length, and the first to have a concrete road surface. The bridge was scheduled to open with the completion of the entire Circle Drive South project on September 30, 2012. However, record rainfall, high water tables and an early snowfall made that deadline unfeasible. The actual completion and opening date was July 31, 2013.

== Name ==
The bridge was first referred to simply as the Circle Drive South Bridge. The Holiday Park community association lobbied Saskatoon City Council to have the bridge named after Christopher J. Yorath, the city's first commissioner. Yorath created a comprehensive town plan in 1913, which included inner and outer "encircling boulevards". Parts of the present-day Circle Drive follows the course in Yorath's plan. Yorath Island, also named for the commissioner, is located upstream from the bridge site. The city council originally decided that a naming contest would be held but then scrapped the idea because of the cost. On June 27, 2016, Saskatoon city council unanimously voted in favour of naming the bridge after recently deceased hockey legend Gordie Howe; a sports facility and a campground bearing his name are located just north of the bridge. Signs with the new name were installed on September 22, 2016.

== Legal disputes ==
The city and the contractor, Graham-Flatiron, disputed over money owed after the project was completed. The city withheld $1.53 million for the delayed completion, as the contract permitted for fines of $10,000 per day late. Graham-Flatiron countered that the city caused the delays because it was too slow with environmental audits, design reviews and approvals, and the handover of land. It claimed the city owed them $19 million in unpaid invoices. The case went to arbitration in April 2015. The city then filed suit against an engineering firm, Stantec, over delays encountered during the project.

== See also ==
- List of crossings of the South Saskatchewan River
- List of bridges in Canada
