= Traffic Bridge =

Bridge in Saskatoon, Saskatchewan, Canada

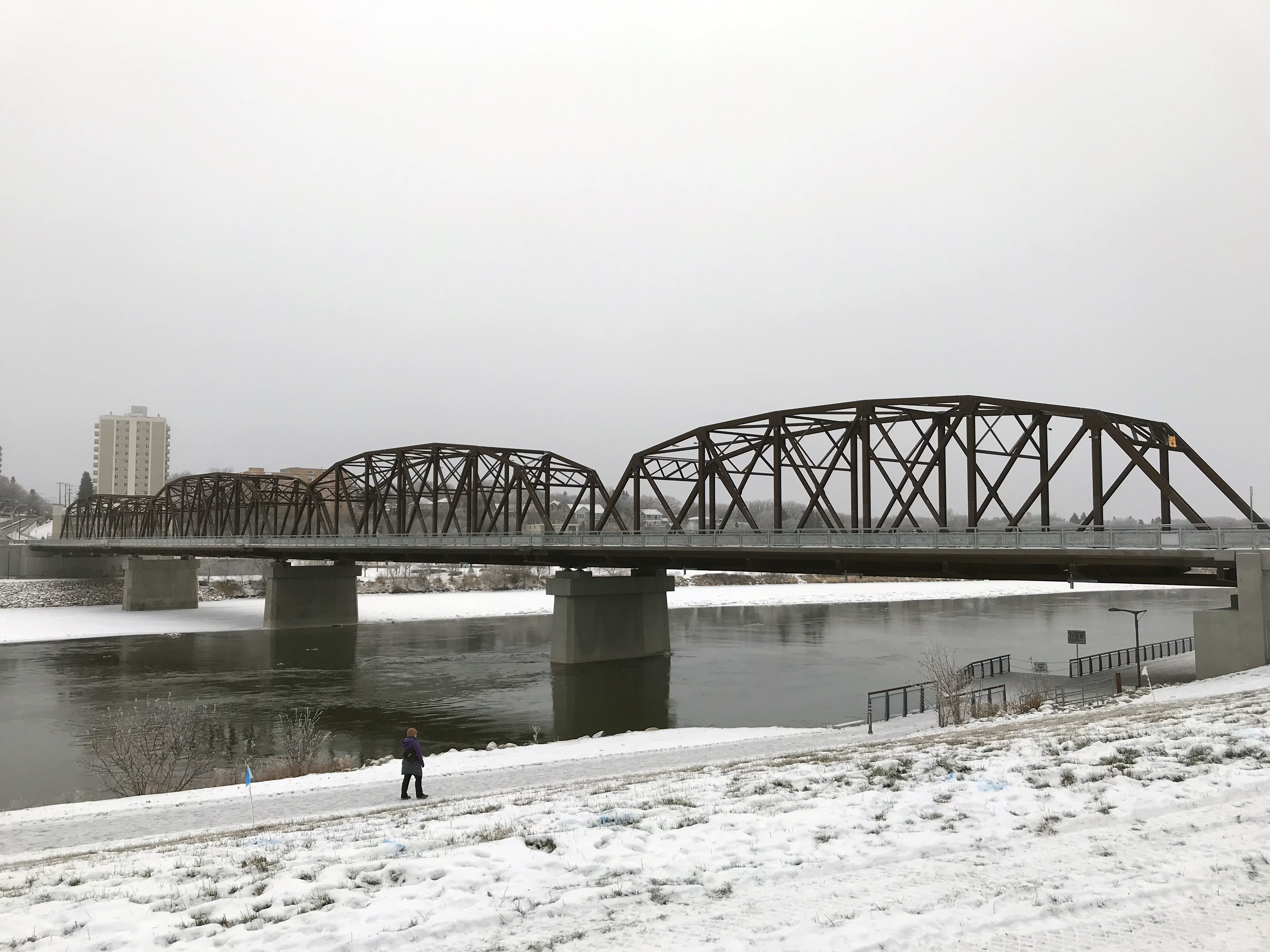
- Replica Traffic Bridge over the South Saskatchewan River
- Coordinates: 52°7′18″N 106°39′48″W
- Carries: 2 lanes of Victoria Avenue/3rd Avenue South
- Crosses: South Saskatchewan River
- Locale: Saskatoon, Saskatchewan, Canada
- Official name: Traffic Bridge
- Other name(s): Victoria Bridge; 19th Street Bridge; 3rd Avenue Bridge; Iron Bridge; Black Bridge; Short Hill Bridge
- Maintained by: City of Saskatoon
- Preceded by: Senator Sid Buckwold Bridge
- Followed by: Broadway Bridge

Characteristics
- Design: Parker truss bridge
- Material: Steel, wood, concrete
- Total length: 289.8 metres (951 ft)
- Width: 5.95 metres (19.5 ft)
- No. of spans: (original) 5; (replica) 4
- Piers in water: 3

History
- Designer: Saskatchewan Department of Public Works
- Constructed by: (original) John D. Gunn and Sons Ltd.; (replica) Graham Construction & Engineering Inc.
- Fabrication by: Canadian Bridge Company/McDiarmid Company
- Construction start: (original) August 1906; (replica) August 2016
- Construction end: (original) October 10, 1907; (replica) October 2, 2018
- Opened: (original) October 10, 1907; (replica) October 3, 2018
- Closed: (original) August 24, 2010

Location
- Interactive map of Traffic Bridge

The Traffic Bridge is the name given to two truss bridges constructed across the South Saskatchewan River, connecting Victoria Avenue with 3rd Avenue South and Spadina Crescent in Saskatoon, Saskatchewan, Canada. The original bridge opened on October 10, 1907, and was the first bridge to carry motor vehicle traffic in Saskatoon, replacing an unreliable ferry service. The promised construction of the bridge was considered a prime factor in the amalgamation of the towns of Saskatoon, Nutana and Riversdale into one city named Saskatoon. The Traffic Bridge was the only road bridge in Saskatoon until 1916, when the University Bridge was completed. In 2010, the bridge was permanently closed due to severe corrosion and was demolished by 2016.

A new truss bridge, a near-replica of the original except with fewer steel spans and a wider road bed, was constructed on the same site after the original bridge was closed. It opened on October 3, 2018.

== Names ==
The bridge is known both popularly and in official correspondence as the Traffic Bridge, originally distinguishing it from the QLLS/CN railway bridge just upstream and later becoming a proper noun in its own right (the railway bridge was built in 1890 and demolished in 1965 when the rail line and downtown yards were removed; the Senator Sid Buckwold Bridge now crosses the river at its former location). Although it is Saskatoon's oldest bridge, it was never formally named until it was nearly a century old. On January 22, 2007, Saskatoon City Council voted to officially name it the "Traffic Bridge", on the recommendation of the Municipal Heritage Advisory Committee, as a way to acknowledge its historic character and the vital role it played in the city's early history. This name was retained for the replacement bridge that opened in October 2018.

The original bridge was referred to by various other names since its construction (see infobox). The most popular name is Victoria Bridge, given that Victoria Avenue runs right up to the bridge's south end. It has been called the 19th Street Bridge, although 19th Street actually passes two blocks north of the bridge and connects with the northwest end of Broadway Bridge (this name made more sense prior to the construction of Broadway Bridge, when the streetcar line came down 19th street before turning onto the bridge) and the 3rd Avenue Bridge, as that is its continuation on the north end of the bridge. Due to its colour, it was also called the Black Bridge, although a later paint scheme was a rather dark grey. It was also sometimes called the Iron Bridge and even the Short Hill Bridge after the Short Hill, down which Victoria Avenue comes (as opposed to "Long Hill" which was a longer route down the same hill originally used by street cars.

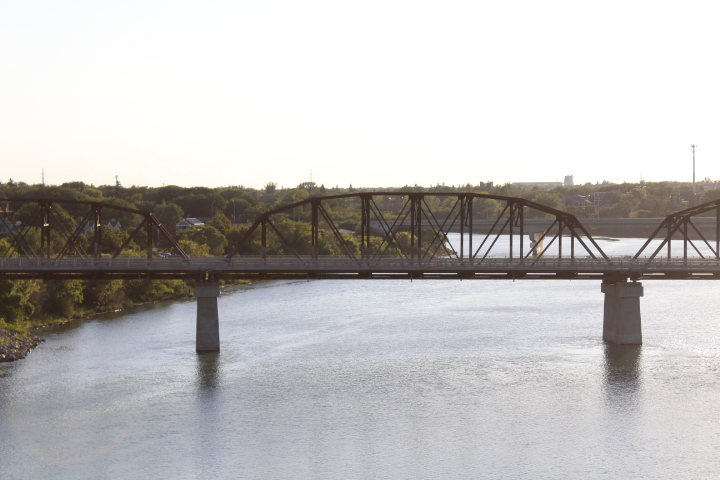

== History ==
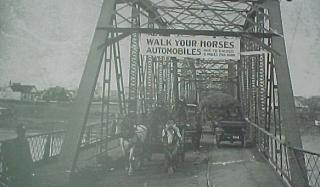
1907 image of the Traffic Bridge

The Traffic Bridge came into being when residents of Nutana agreed to merge with the town of Saskatoon and the village of Riversdale to form a city. As a condition of their joining with the other two communities, they demanded that a bridge be built for foot and vehicular traffic. Up to then, the only way to cross the river was on an unreliable ferry, or a difficult and sometimes dangerous walk across the QLLS railway bridge. The province provided funding and John Gunn and Sons was selected as the contractor. On October 10, 1907, the Traffic Bridge officially opened.

Less than a year after it opened, on June 7, 1908, the bridge became the site of Saskatoon's only shipping disaster, when a steamboat called the SS City of Medicine Hat crashed into one of the bridge's piers and sank; all aboard managed to make it to safety. This accident marked the end of steamboat traffic on the river. An anchor presumed to be the SS City of Medicine Hat's was located in August 2006 by divers training just downstream, near the Broadway Bridge. This discovery led to a full-scale, five-day underwater excavation, which was conducted from September 8 to 12, 2008. A number of artifacts were uncovered from the water. A documentary film, titled "The Last Steamship: The Search for the SS City of Medicine Hat" was created in 2010 about the wreck and the search. More artifacts were unearthed in 2012 underneath Rotary Park, where the river used to run until it was covered by landfill to create the park in the 1960s.

Two roadways cut out of the riverbank are often associated with the Traffic Bridge. Short Hill referred to the steep rise up the east bank from the foot of the bridge along Victoria Avenue. The grade was too steep for most wagon teams, as well as the streetcars that began operation in 1913. Long Hill referred to the more gradual slope up the east riverbank from the foot of the bridge to the end of 12th Street, around where the end of the Broadway Bridge is today. This road followed the old ferry road up the bank along what is now Saskatchewan Crescent. Even the Long Hill was difficult for streetcars; in March 1922, a streetcar derailed when it slid off ice-covered tracks while attempting to turn onto the bridge.

The 2 metre-wide pedestrian walkway was added on the upstream side of the bridge in 1908. In 1961, the southern end of the bridge was raised to reduce the slope on the Short Hill and to improve traffic flow, allowing Saskatchewan Crescent to pass underneath the bridge. The bridge carried approximately 10,000 vehicles per day.

The bridge was repainted in 1979, albeit as little or no surface preparation was done the work was of dubious structural benefit. Beginning in the 1980s, the bridge started to show its age and needed to be closed periodically for refurbishment. Some adjustments were also made to widen the roadway, as many modern motorists were experiencing difficulty crossing the bridge. It was also closed for extended periods of time in the early 1990s when City of Saskatoon work crews damaged the bridge twice by driving over the bridge with vehicles too heavy or too large for the bridge specifications.

== Closures ==
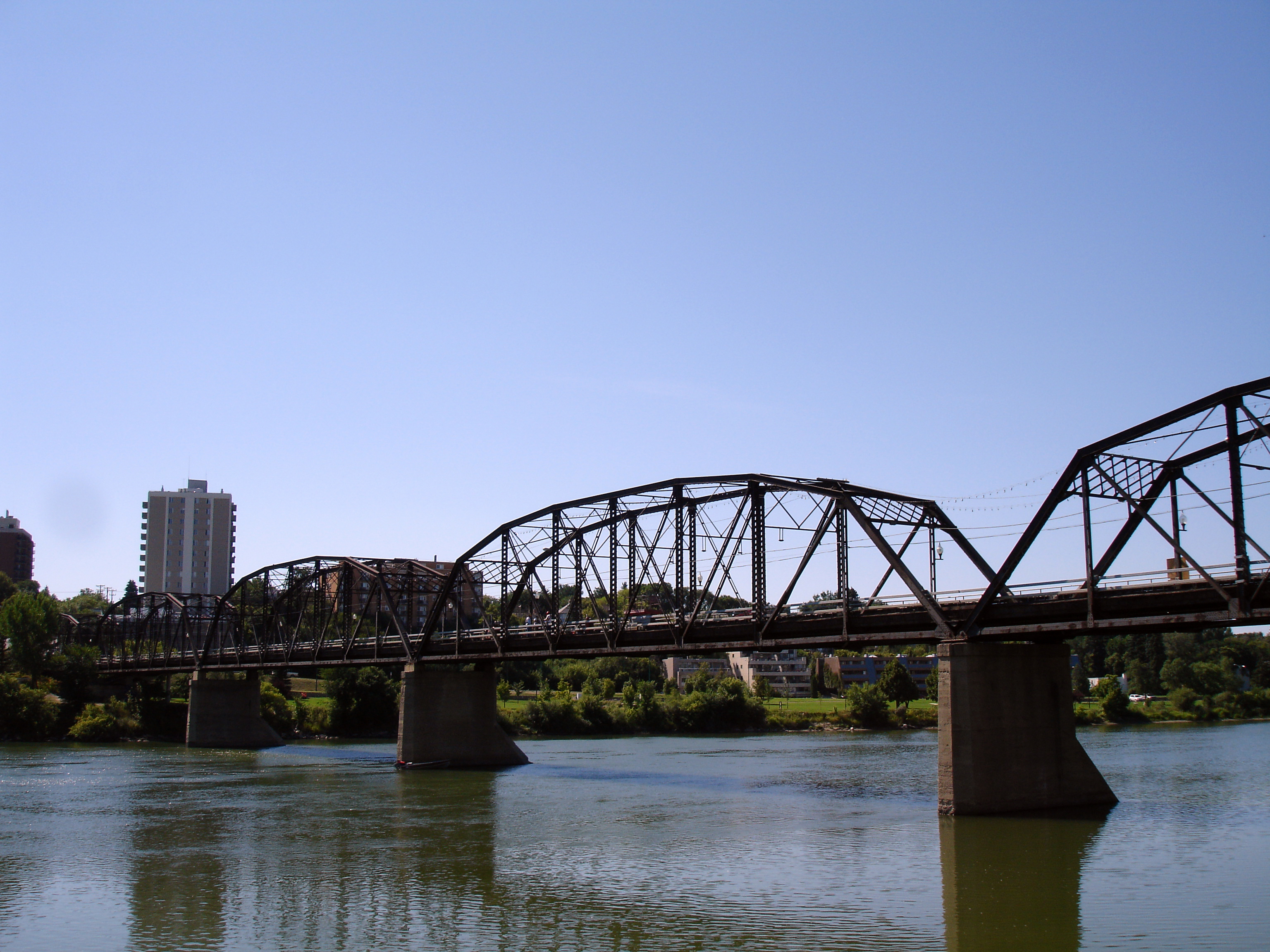
Original Traffic Bridge as seen from the west riverbank

=== Temporary (2005–2006) ===
On September 6, 2005, the City of Saskatoon closed the bridge for inspection, in preparation for planned upgrades to the roadway (including the installation of the city's first roundabout (since the removal of the "traffic circle" on 8th Street a decade earlier) just off the north end of the bridge) in anticipation of an adjacent riverfront development (River Landing). On November 2, the bridge was closed indefinitely to vehicular traffic upon completion of the inspection, due to corrosion and other factors. The bridge was re-opened on September 8, 2006, following repairs that cost $500,000. The bridge remained open to pedestrian and bicycle traffic for most of this period. Replacing the bridge instead of repairing it would have cost between $24 and $45 million.

Without major repairs, engineers had given the bridge a 20 year life expectancy (either as a vehicle or a pedestrian crossing). The job of sandblasting the bridge to bare metal and re-painting it was made very expensive by the need to keep all sandblasting debris out of the river as the existing paint was lead-based.

The bridge's arches were equipped with several series of decorative LED lights in the summer of 2007. They included a programmable controller that made the lights change colour and move in different patterns. However, the lights proved controversial; they cost the city $462,000, which was almost twice the city's original estimate. They also broke down frequently, fueling further complaints from the public about their high price tag.

=== Permanent closure (2010) ===
On August 24, 2010, the City of Saskatoon closed the original Traffic Bridge to vehicles, bicycles and pedestrians following a preliminary inspection which could not conclude that the bridge was safe.

"When the preliminary inspection results came back this afternoon, the inspectors were not able to certify that the lower steel structural members inspected so far were safe", explained Infrastructure Services General Manager Mike Gutek. "We knew there was corrosion under there, but based on the limits and the extent of the deterioration, and in the interest of public safety, we are closing the bridge indefinitely."

According to Mayor Don Atchison on August 25, 2010, "The bridge is going to collapse. It's imminent that is going to collapse", further comparing it to the I-35W Mississippi River bridge collapse of 2007. The bridge's closure initially led to traffic tie-ups leading into the downtown, which were feared to be long-term if the bridge was not repaired or replaced. A 2010 poll conducted by Insightrix Research showed that the public was split over to repair or replace the bridge.

== Replacement ==
=== Proposals ===
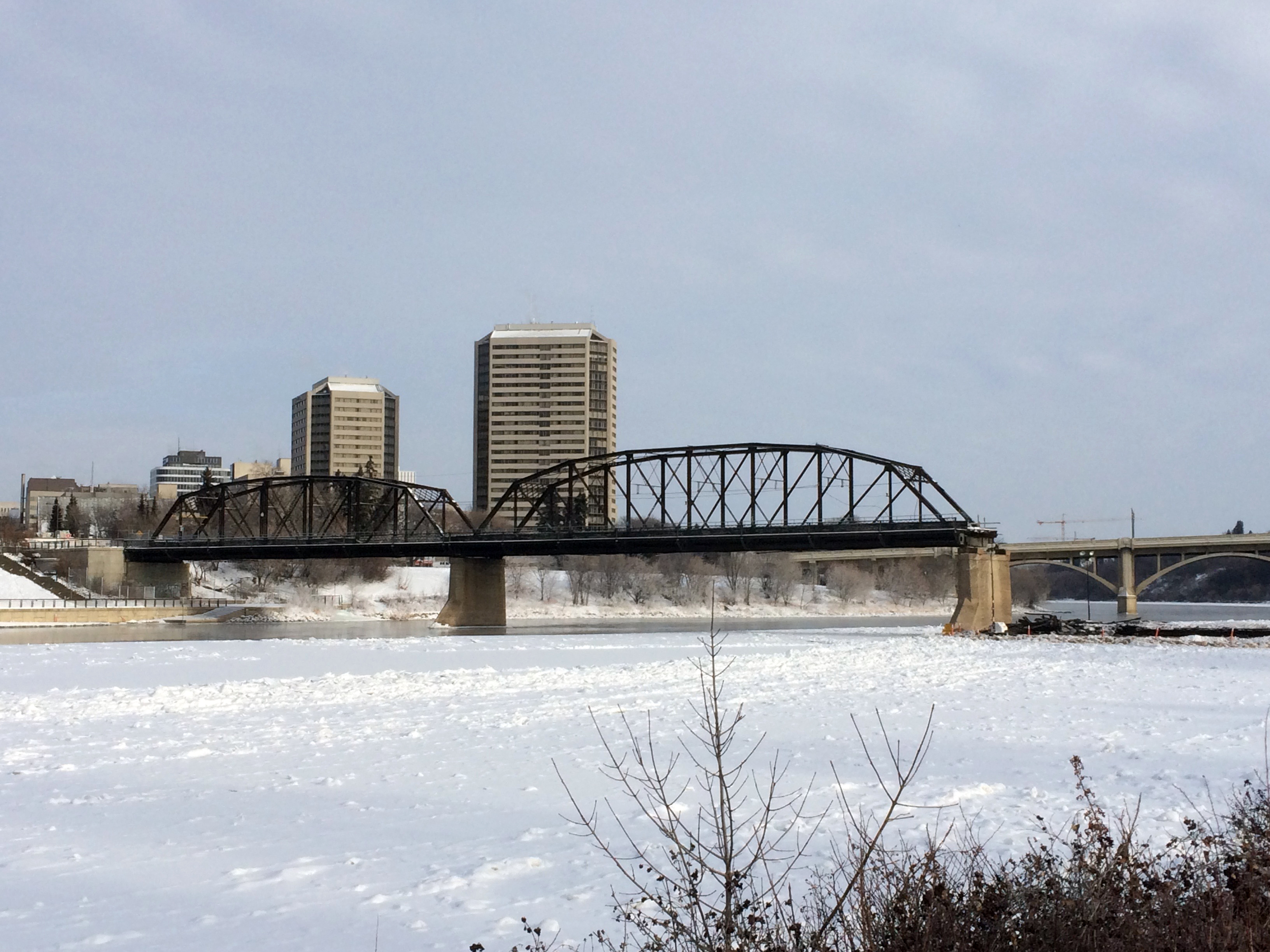
Partially demolished bridge in 2016

The city commissioned Stantec Consulting to consider options for the future of the Traffic Bridge. The report came up with a number of recommendations, ranging from rehabilitating the existing bridge to replacing it with a new structure. City council voted to eliminate any options that removed vehicle traffic from the bridge. After a series of public meetings and online surveys, the city administration recommended that the bridge be demolished and replaced with a modern steel truss bridge, but one of similar design to the original. On December 6, 2010, city council voted 8–3 to proceed. Although the final design, funding and timeline for construction for the new bridge are yet to be determined, it will be wider and possibly shorter than the existing structure. Proposals to salvage sections of the original bridge and its LED lights were scrapped due to cost, as decided by an executive committee in May 2011.

Funding for the replacement of the Traffic Bridge was announced in 2014. In 2015, the city's administration said it could save money on the project if restrictions on the design were relaxed. Graham Commuter Partners was selected as the contractor, and illustrations of the new bridge were released in October 2015. The new bridge will have four spans instead of the original's five, built on the existing piers which will be reinforced. Construction on the new bridge began in 2016.

=== Deconstruction ===
Demolition of the bridge first began on May 28, 2012. The pedestrian access ramp on the south side of the bridge was removed first to enable load testing on the piers. Work began to tear down the first span on the east bank of the river on October 12, 2012. By October 18th, the first span had been severed from the rest of the bridge. On January 10, 2016, two spans of the bridge were imploded. The northernmost span was removed by explosives on February 7. The final span of the original bridge was torn down by machinery on November 17, 2016.

=== Completion ===
The replacement bridge was scheduled to be opened in the fall of 2018. In late April, 2017, the replacement bridge was half complete. City officials warned thrill-seekers that construction made the water near the bridge extra hazardous.

The new bridge was completed on time and had a public opening ceremony on October 2, 2018. Vehicular traffic was allowed as of October 3, one day after the opening of the Chief Mistawasis Bridge at the north end of Saskatoon.

== See also ==
- List of crossings of the South Saskatchewan River
- List of bridges in Canada
- List of bridges
