= List of historic places in Saskatoon =

This article is a list of historic places in Saskatoon, Saskatchewan entered on the Canadian Register of Historic Places, whether they are federal, provincial, or municipal.

== List of historic places ==
Name	Address	Coordinates	Government recognition (CRHP №)	Wikidata ID	Image
1020 Spadina Crescent E	1020 Spadina Crescent E Saskatoon SK	52°08′14″N 106°38′48″W	Saskatoon municipality (9209)		
Knox United Church	838 Spadina Crescent E Saskatoon SK	52°07′48″N 106°39′14″W	Saskatoon municipality (4990)		
VIA Rail (Union) Station	Chappel Dr. (south-west end of town); Saskatoon SK	52°06′22″N 106°44′28″W	Federal (4576)	Q3097689	More images
Forestry Farm Superintendent's Residence	1903 Forestry Farm Park Dr. Saskatoon SK	52°07′00″N 106°38′02″W	Saskatoon municipality (1522)		
Saskatoon Electrical System Substation	619 Main Street; Saskatoon SK	52°07′02″N 106°39′18″W	Saskatoon municipality (4989)	Q7425655	More images
Albert School	1001 11th Street East; Saskatoon SK	52°07′08″N 106°38′46″W	Saskatoon municipality (5177)		
Land Titles Building	311 - 21st Street East; Saskatoon SK	52°07′35″N 106°39′44″W	Saskatchewan (2217)	Q6483988	More images
Fairbanks-Morse Building	12 23rd Street East; Saskatoon SK	52°07′55″N 106°40′08″W	Saskatoon municipality (4985)	Q5430005	More images
Hutchinson Building	144 2nd Avenue South; Saskatoon SK	52°07′40″N 106°39′50″W	Saskatoon municipality (4987)	Q5950648	More images
St. John's Anglican Cathedral	816 Spadina Crescent East; Saskatoon SK	52°07′47″N 106°39′22″W	Saskatoon municipality (4992)	Q5052401	More images
Independent Order of Odd Fellows Temple	416 21st Street East; Saskatoon SK	52°07′36″N 106°39′36″W	Saskatoon municipality (5176)		
Next of Kin Memorial Avenue National Historic Site of Canada	Saskatoon SK	52°08′50″N 106°39′29″W	Federal (13557)	Q7021204	More images
McLean Block	263 3rd Avenue South; Saskatoon SK	52°07′33″N 106°39′47″W	Saskatoon municipality (13872)		
Cambridge Court	129 5th Avenue North; Saskatoon SK	52°07′45″N 106°39′32″W	Saskatoon municipality (13874)		
Larkin House	925 5th Avenue North; Saskatoon SK	52°08′38″N 106°39′25″W	Saskatoon municipality (13875)		
Canadian Pacific Railway Station	305 Idylwyld Drive N Saskatoon SK	52°07′56″N 106°40′16″W	Federal (6502), Saskatoon municipality (1519)	Q5013716	More images
Pioneer Cemetery or Nutana Cemetery	Ruth Street West and St. Henry Avenue; Saskatoon SK	52°06′02″N 106°41′02″W	Saskatoon municipality (4980)	Q7070417	More images
Bowerman Residence	1328 Avenue K South; Saskatoon SK	52°06′32″N 106°41′10″W	Saskatoon municipality (9205)	Q4950878	More images
Landa Residence	202 Avenue E South; Saskatoon SK	52°07′36″N 106°40′23″W	Saskatoon municipality (9206)	Q6484293	Upload Photo
Aden Bowman Residence	1018 McPherson Avenue; Saskatoon SK	52°07′00″N 106°40′16″W	Saskatoon municipality (13873)		
Former Fire Hall No. 3	612 11th Street E Saskatoon SK	52°07′13″N 106°39′11″W	Saskatoon municipality (1520)	Q5470088	More images
Arrand Block	520-524 11th Street E Saskatoon SK	52°07′08″N 106°39′29″W	Saskatoon municipality (1980)	Q4795840	More images
College Building	University of Saskatchewan campus Saskatoon SK	52°07′48″N 106°37′55″W	Federal (6772), Saskatchewan (3099)	Q7175577	More images
Old Stone School	University of Saskatchewan campus Saskatoon SK	52°07′46″N 106°38′28″W	Saskatoon municipality (9207)	Q7927025	More images
F. P. Martin House	718 Saskatchewan Crescent East; Saskatoon SK	52°07′23″N 106°39′14″W	Saskatoon municipality (4981)		
Thirteenth Street East Row Housing	711-723 13th Street E Saskatoon SK	52°07′16″N 106°39′11″W	Saskatoon municipality (4984)		
Marr Residence	326 11th Street East; Saskatoon SK	52°07′06″N 106°39′47″W	Saskatoon municipality (4986)	Q3944776	More images
The Broadway Theatre	715 Broadway Avenue; Saskatoon SK	52°07′06″N 106°39′22″W	Saskatoon municipality (4988)	Q4972523	More images
Rugby Chapel	1337 College Drive; Saskatoon SK	52°07′45″N 106°38′17″W	Saskatoon municipality (4994)	Q7378158	More images
The Trounce House and The Gustin House	512 10th Street East; Saskatoon SK	52°07′03″N 106°39′32″W	Saskatoon municipality (6454)	Q5621626	More images
Sommerville/Petitt House	870 University Drive; Saskatoon SK	52°07′26″N 106°38′53″W	Saskatoon municipality (9208)	Q7560469	More images
Bottomley House	1118 College Drive; Saskatoon SK	52°07′43″N 106°38′35″W	Saskatoon municipality (13871)	Q110980657	More images
Forestry Farm Park and Zoo National Historic Site of Canada	1903 Forestry Farm Park Dr, Saskatoon, SK S7S 1G9; Saskatoon SK	52°09′32″N 106°35′06″W	Federal (7610)	Q5469254	More images
Wanuskewin National Historic Site of Canada	Saskatoon SK	52°13′30″N 106°35′02″W	Federal (15685)	Q3566179	More images
Little Chief Service Station	344 20th Street W. Saskatoon SK	52°07′35″N 106°40′29″W	Saskatoon municipality (4983)		

== See also ==
- List of National Historic Sites of Canada in Saskatchewan
