= Doors Open Saskatoon =

Doors Open Saskatoon is a biannual event held in the City of Saskatoon, Saskatchewan, Canada, that gives the public access to many of the city's unique or historically significant buildings. Admission is free of charge. The one day even occurs every two years.

== Example buildings ==
The fifth Doors Open even occurred in Saskatoon in 2011. Over 20 buildings were included in the 2011 event. Some of the buildings included:

- 2nd Avenue Lofts
- Avenue Building
- Drinkle Building
- HMCS Unicorn
- Hotel Senator
- John Deere Building
- Kindrachuk Agrey Building
- Marr Residence
- Odd Fellows Temple Building
- Remai Arts Centre
- Saskatoon Public Schools Head-office

== See also ==
- Doors Open Canada
