= Durno (surname) =

Durno is a surname. Notable people with the surname include:

- Chris Durno (born 1980), Canadian ice hockey player
- Edwin Durno (1899–1976), American physician, politician, and infantry sergeant
- James Durno (c.1745–1795), British historical painter
- Jeannette Durno, Canadian-born American pianist
