= Nutana, Saskatoon =

Nutana
- Neighbourhood
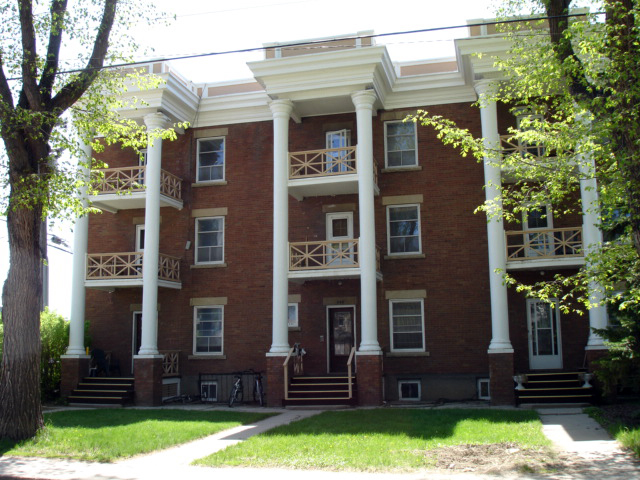
- Arrand Block (1912)

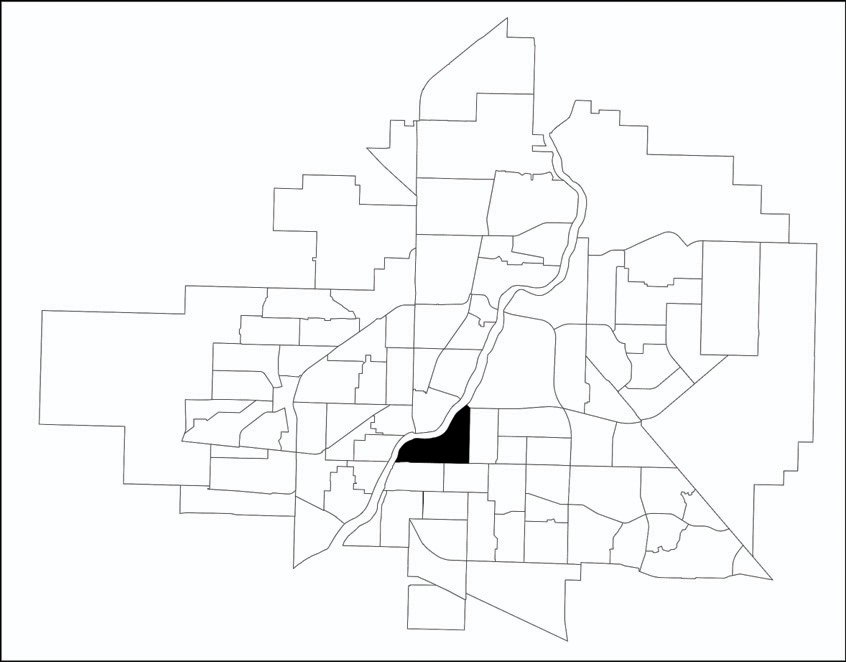
- Nutana location map
- Coordinates: 52°07′00″N 106°39′25″W
- Country: Canada
- Province: Saskatchewan
- City: Saskatoon
- Sector: Core Neighbourhoods
- Settled: 1883 (as Saskatoon)
- Incorporated (village): 1903 (as Nutana)
- Incorporated (city): 1906 (as Saskatoon)

Government
  - Type: Municipal (Ward 6)
  - Administrative body: Saskatoon City Council
  - Councillor: Jasmin Parker
  - MLA: Erika Ritchie
  - MP: Corey Tochor

Area
  - Total: 1.82 km^{2} (0.70 sq mi)

Population (2024)
  - Total: 6,380
  - Median personal income: $50,000
- Time zone: UTC−6 (UTC)
- Website: www.nutana.ca

Nutana is a primarily residential neighbourhood located near the centre of Saskatoon, Saskatchewan, Canada. It includes the business district of Broadway Avenue. It comprises a nearly even mixture of low-density, single detached dwellings and apartment-style multiple unit dwellings. As of 2024, the area is home to 6,380 residents. The neighbourhood is considered a middle to upper-income area, with a median personal income of $50,000, an average sale price of $529,332 and a home ownership rate of 49.0%. First established in 1883, Nutana was the original settlement of what now makes up the city of Saskatoon.

== History ==
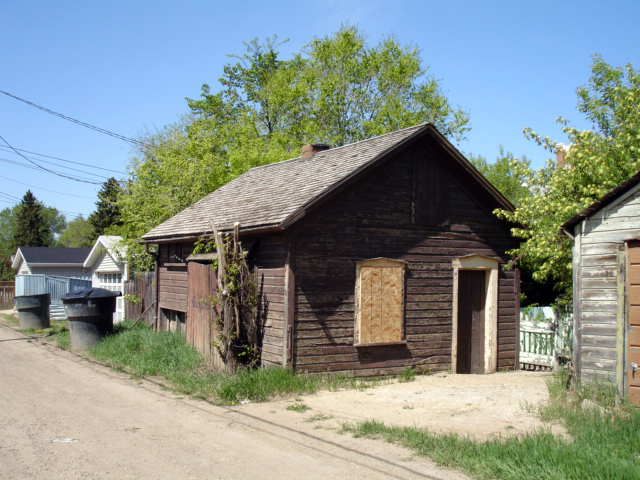
Trounce House (1883)

The first permanent settlement was established by the Temperance Colonization Society, a group of Toronto Methodists, under John Neilson Lake. The group moved into the area in 1883, a year after Lake and a scouting party had looked for a suitable colony site. The site chosen by Lake was on the suggestion of Chief Whitecap of the Dakota tribe. The land for the settlement was located in the Treaty 6 region. Saskatoon was officially settled on August 18, 1883. The name is thought to be derived from the Cree word "missaskwatoomina", referring to the saskatoon berry shrubs that grew along the riverbank. By 1884, ferry service across the river began, making Saskatoon the crossing point for the busy Regina – Battleford Trail. It brought more commercial traffic and business, as well as more settlers to the region. The first post office was established October 1, 1884, with J. H. C. Willoughby as the first postmaster. By 1886, there were 29 homes constructed, and the community boasted a variety of professionals and tradesmen.

Still, the planned temperance colony failed for several reasons: the group was not able to obtain a contiguous block of land; the river was too shallow to ferry supplies and settlers; the nearest railway was 150 miles (240 km) away in Moose Jaw; land routes were small, often unmarked trails; and fears of hostility from indigenous peoples during the 1885 North-West Rebellion dampened enthusiasm from potential settlers. Without a rail link and enduring years of drought from 1885 to 1890, the economy consisted of little but subsistence farming. The first agricultural fair, later to become the Saskatoon Exhibition, was held on October 13, 1886, at the "Louise Grounds" (now Nutana Collegiate's schoolyard). The exhibition was staged there until 1903, when it was moved to the City Park neighbourhood and later the city's exhibition grounds further south.

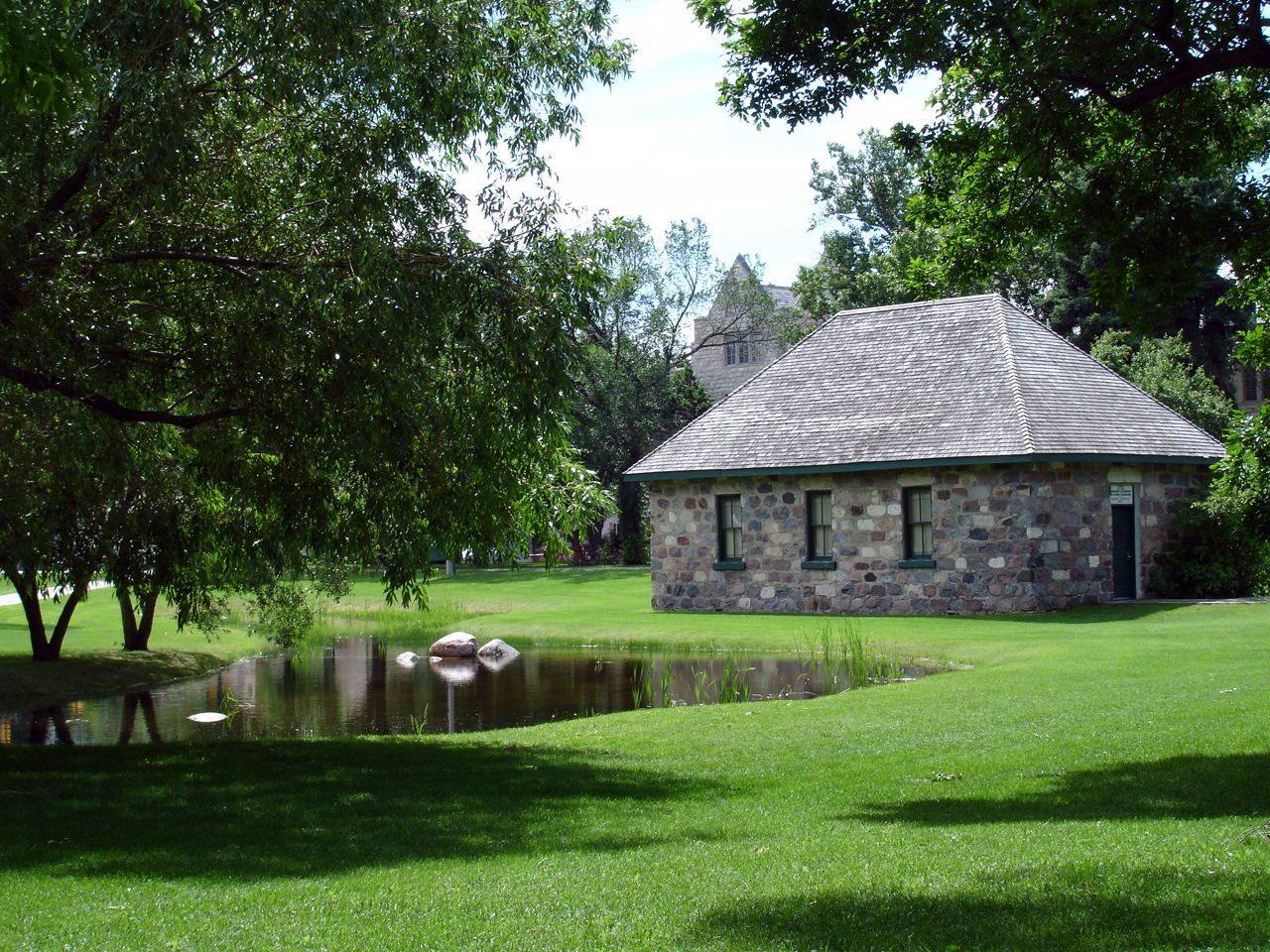
The original Victoria School (1888), in its present location on the University of Saskatchewan campus

The original Victoria School was built in 1888 by stonemason Alexander (Sandy) Marr as the first school house of the temperance colony. Located at the Five Corners crossing at Broadway Avenue and 12th Street, the school yard would eventually be home to three school buildings as the population grew, the last of which being the present-day École Victoria School. The first Victoria School was dismantled and reassembled on a site at the University of Saskatchewan campus in 1911. The building is often referred to as the Little Stone Schoolhouse.

When the Qu'Appelle, Long Lake and Saskatchewan Railway reached Saskatoon in 1890 and crossed the South Saskatchewan River, a settlement on the west bank of the river (Saskatoon's future downtown) was established, saving the existing settlement from extinction. The area now had railway links to both Regina and Prince Albert; however, the commercial centre shifted across to the west side of the river. Broadway Avenue remained the commercial and social center for the east bank. By 1901, the west bank's population had reached 113 and it incorporated as the Village of Saskatoon. Stripped of its original name, the east bank settlement renamed itself "Nutana", a scrambled inversion of "Saskatoon". It incorporated as a town on October 3, 1903, as Saskatoon had done earlier that year on July 1.

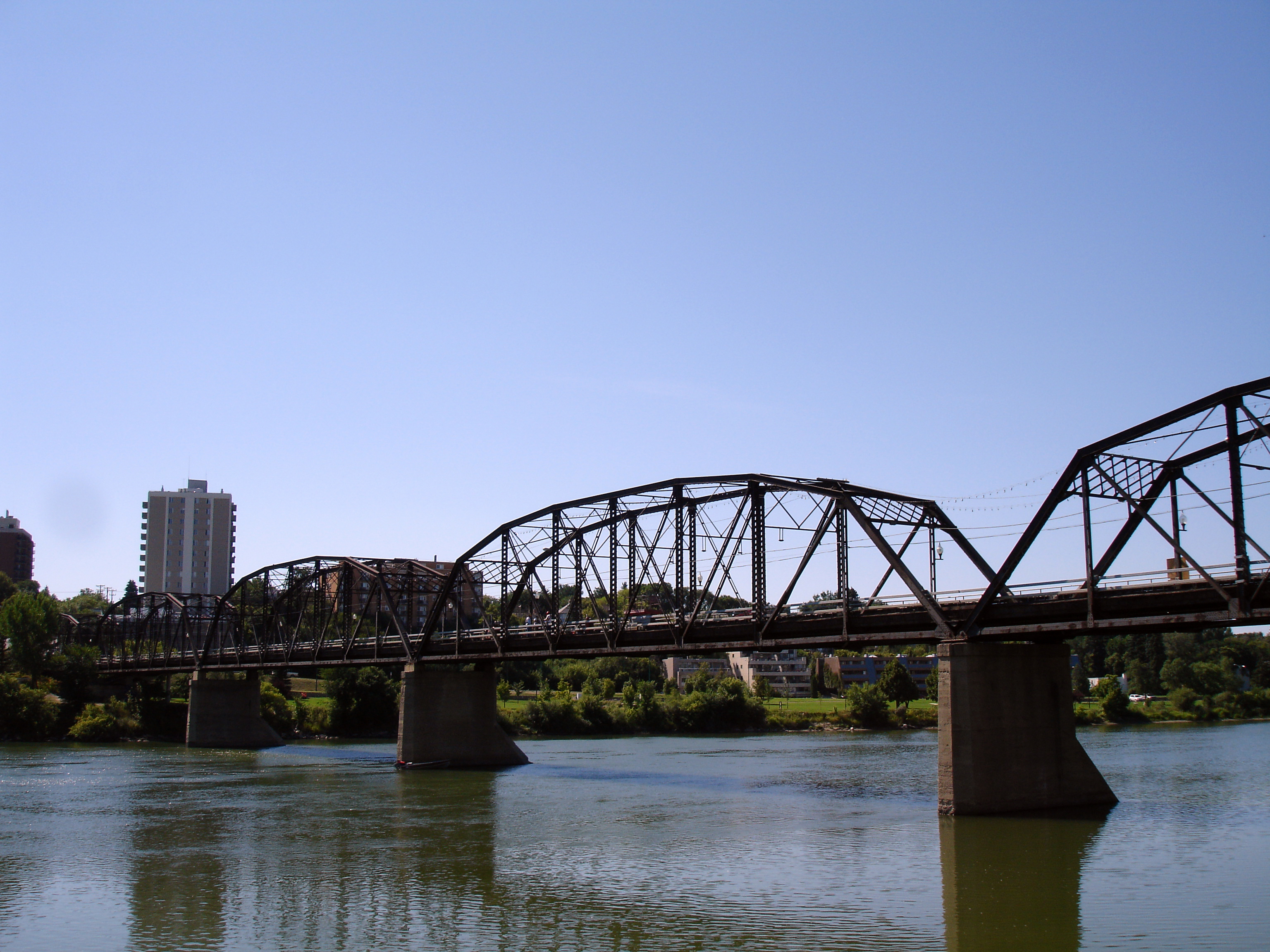
Original Traffic Bridge

A heavy influx of people into the area over the next three years put a strain on the two new towns, as well as the new neighbouring village of Riversdale. Despite the advantages of amalgamating into a single settlement, Nutana's residents demanded that a traffic bridge be built to link the two sides of the river. Up to then, the only way across the river was an unreliable ferry, or a difficult and sometimes dangerous walk across the railway bridge. In 1906, the provincial government committed to building a bridge, and Nutana ratepayers came onside. A city charter was drawn up, and Nutana merged with the town Saskatoon and the village of Riversdale to become the city of Saskatoon on July 1, 1906. The following year on October 10, 1907, the promised bridge was opened and called the Traffic Bridge. In the following decades, three more traffic bridges would link Nutana to the downtown: University Bridge (1916), Broadway Bridge (1932), and the Idylwyld Bridge (1966), which replaced the original CN railway bridge.

The period between 1910 and 1912 were particularly prosperous for Saskatoon, and many of Nutana's landmark buildings were built in this time. The economic boom turned to bust by 1913, just prior to World War I, but rebounded during the Roaring Twenties. The Great Depression saw another economic downturn, followed by another period of prosperity after World War II. However, by the end of the 1950s, the advent of newer subdivisions, chain stores and shopping malls drew commercial activity away from the traditional businesses in Nutana. Home construction also slowed during this period. The neighbourhood went into decline for several decades, as exemplified by the Broadway Theatre becoming an "adult" movie theatre. In the mid-1980s, Broadway merchants and community groups began to organize in an effort to turn the area's fortunes around. In 1984, the Broadway Theatre was turned into repertory movie house and live performance venue. With the establishment of the Broadway Business Improvement District in 1986, a revitalization program was launched to refurbish the streetscape and reintroduce the area's historic identity. These events spurred a period of gentrification in Nutana; today, Broadway Avenue is again an active commercial district and the Nutana area is again considered desirable.

=== Historic buildings ===
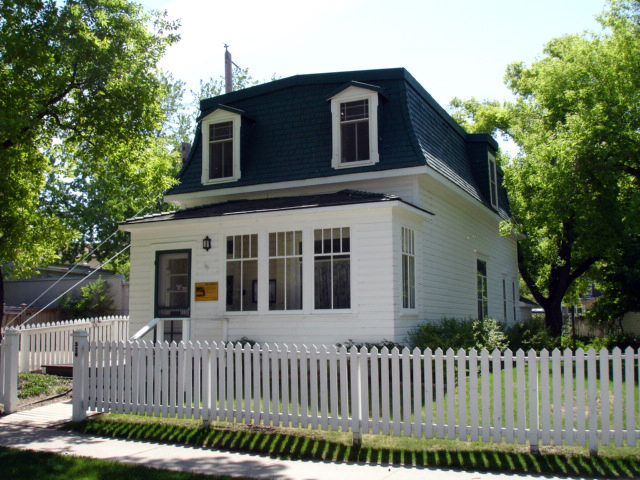
Marr Residence (1884)

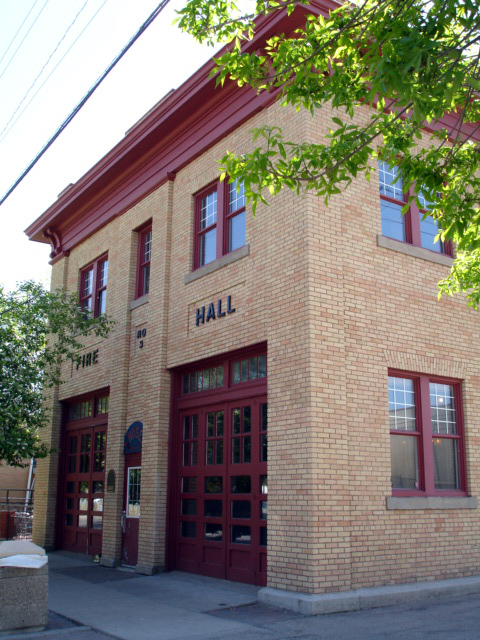
Fire Hall No. 3 (1911)

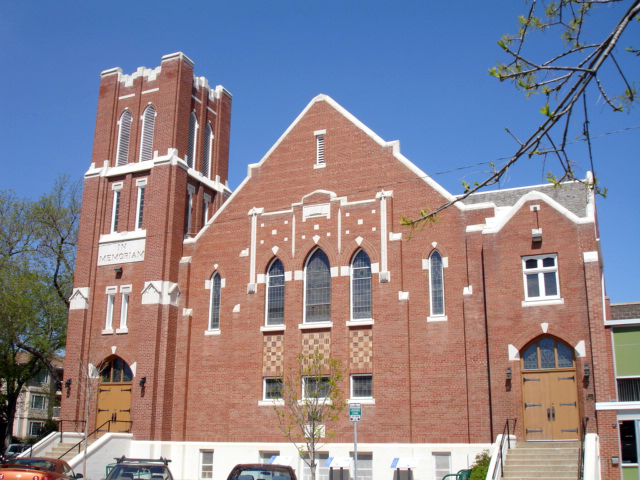
Grace Westminster United Church (1928)

- Trounce House (1883) – The oldest structure in Saskatoon and the last of the original houses from the temperance colony founded by John Lake. It was purchased by Henry and Bessie Trounce in 1883 from John J. Conn. In 1920 the house was moved to the back of the lot and converted into a garage while at the front, the Gustin Residence was built. Designated a municipal heritage property on April 10, 1989.
- Marr Residence (1884) – Built by Sandy Marr, it is the oldest building in Saskatoon on its original site. It was one of several houses requisitioned as a field hospital to treat wounded soldiers during the North-West Rebellion. Designated a municipal heritage property on January 11, 1982.
- Garrison House (1886) – Built entirely of fieldstone by George Wesley Garrison. Between 1891 and 1894, Garrison leased rooms to the North-West Mounted Police – presumably in this building – thus giving rise to its nickname "the jail" and to stories of cells in the basement. It was dismantled to its stone foundation in 1918 and rebuilt in concrete and brick.
- Victoria School (three buildings; 1887, 1905, 1909) – The original stone one-room schoolhouse, built by Alexander Marr, was relocated to the University of Saskatchewan campus in 1911. It was designated a municipal heritage property on May 17, 1982. A second school, now demolished, was built in 1905. The third and final school, designed by Walter W. LaChance, was opened in 1909 and remains to the present day.
- Bell House (1910) – A luxury riverbank house designed by noted Regina architects Edgar Storey and William Van Egmond. While the building was divided into suites in 1942, it has now been returned to single family use.
- Nutana Collegiate (1910) – Originally named the Saskatoon Collegiate Institute when it opened in 1910, Nutana collegiate was the first secondary school in the city. At first, Nutana Collegiate housed university and normal school (teacher training) as well. Storey and Van Egmond designed the building in a French Renaissance style.
- Fire Hall#3 (1911) – A two-storey structure of yellow brick banded by a heavy bracketed wooden cornice, it served as a fire hall until 1956. From 1959, at the height of the Cold War, it was used by the Department of Civil Defence as a radiation proof communications centre. It is now a bar and restaurant featuring mementos from the now-demolished Capitol Theatre. Designated a municipal heritage property on February 25, 1991.
- Thirteenth Street Terrace (1911) – Classical in design and novel in its day, this two-storey row housing was an alternative to owning a single family home in boom-time Saskatoon. It was built in 1911–1912 by Henry A. Cook, liveryman, farmer, real estate salesman and owner of the Waldorf Café. Designated a municipal heritage property on December 12, 2000.
- Arrand Block (1912) – Neo-Classical style apartment block built by cousins Richard and Walter Arrand, noted Saskatoon contractors. Designated a municipal heritage property on April 10, 1989. Richard Arrand is credited with inventing the first power cement mixer, but failed to patent his design.
- Calder House (1912) – A luxurious three-storey riverbank house built for Truman Frederick Calder, apparently to replicate a similar house in Toronto that his wife Adella liked. Unfortunately Mr. Calder was struck by lightning in 1914 and killed. The house changed ownership several times and was converted into apartments in 1942. It is now a bed & breakfast.
- Sommerville/Petitt House (1912) – It was designed by Frank P. Martin in 1912 and commissioned by Herman Pettit, about whom extremely little is known. A dentist, Dr. George Sommerville, bought the house in 1918. Designated a municipal heritage property on May 16, 1988.
- Gustin Residence (1920) – The home and studio of internationally renowned piano teacher Lyell Gustin. Designated a municipal heritage property on April 10, 1989.
- F.P. Martin House (1926) – Two-storey Cottage Vernacular house was built by architect, Frank P. Martin, to be his private residence, with a semi-detached unit available for rental purposes. Noted for its high-pitched roof with double shed dormers, interlocking tile and stucco cladding, and Gothic doorways. Designated a municipal heritage property on March 3, 1997.
- Grace-Westminster United Church – David Webster designed this church for the congregation of Grace United, which originated from the original Methodist church of the temperance colony. The tower was added in 1949, and the present name adopted as the result of a 1968 merger with the congregation of Westminster United.
- St. Joseph's Catholic Church – Designed to a Romanesque style by G. Verbeke. The taller of the towers was intended for bells which were never installed.
- St. Joseph's School (1928) – Designed by David Webster, this was built at the same time as the church of the same name. The high school was established in 1980 in an agreement between the provincial government, the school division and the Kitotiminawak (parent advisory) Council. The name was changed in 1989 to Joe Duquette High School, and again in 2007 to Oskayak High School.
- Main Street Electrical Substation (1929) – Built to satisfy increased demand for electricity, it was constructed of Redcliffe brick and Claybank dark brick in a mix of Modern Classical and Prairie styles. After being decommissioned in 1973, the building fell into disrepair until being rehabilitated and turned into an office building. Designated a municipal heritage property on December 4, 2000.
- Davis Dairy (1930) – Built by architects Webster and Gilbert in 1930 for the Davis Dairy Company, then situated on Main Street. It served as a dairy until the 1970s but went through several owners – Purity Dairy, Silverwood Dairy, and finally the Dairy Pool. In 1994 the later exterior stucco was replaced by a fine brick facade in the style of the original and the interior was completely renovated.
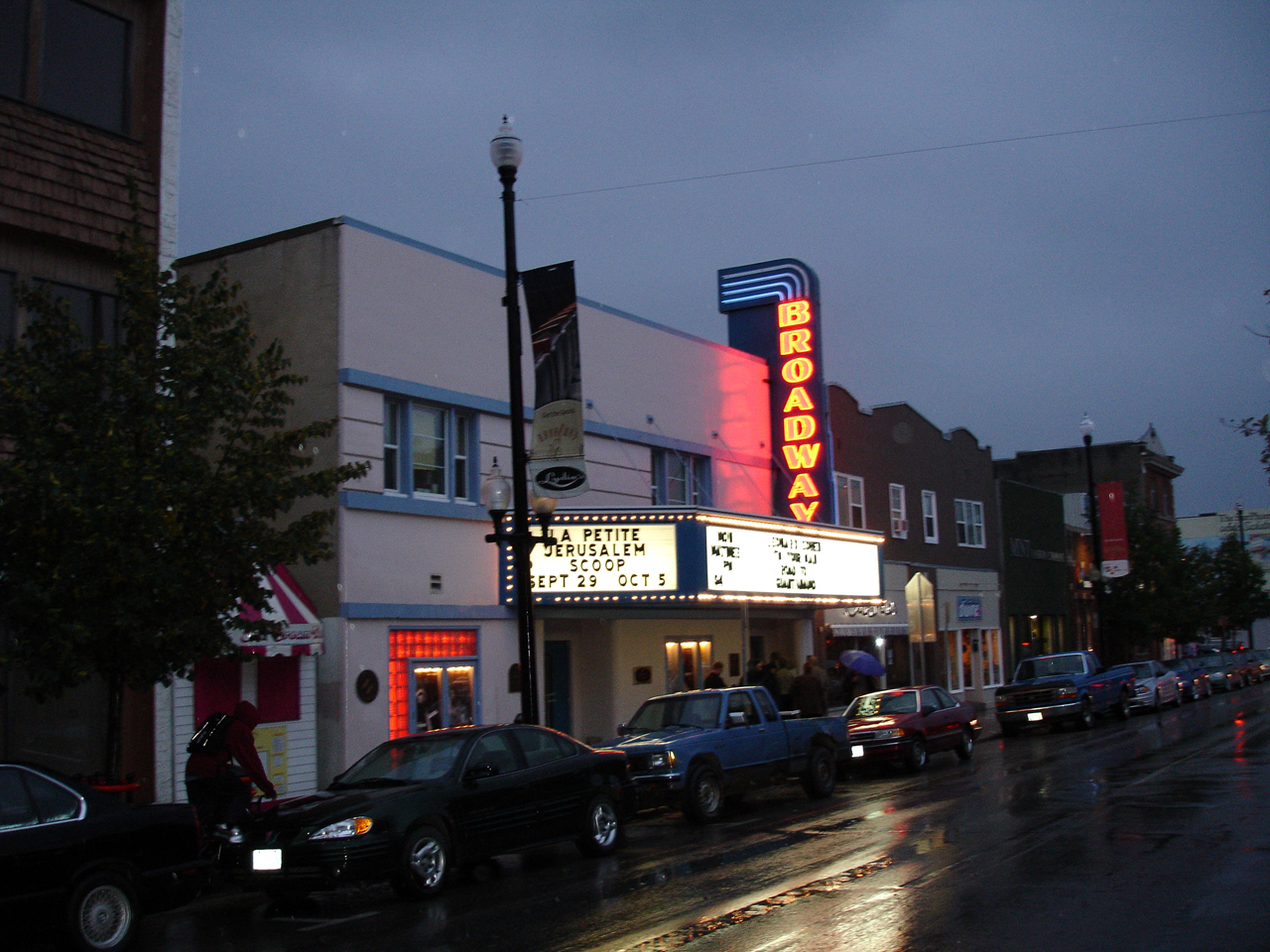
  Broadway Theatre (1947)
- Broadway Theatre (1947) – This Art Deco style movie theatre was Broadway's entertainment destination during the post-World War II years. After falling into disrepute as an "adult" movie theatre, it was restored as an arthouse cinema and live performance venue during the 1980s. Designated a municipal heritage property on April 14, 1997.

== Government and politics ==
Nutana exists within the federal electoral district of Saskatoon—University. It is currently represented by Corey Tochor of the Conservative Party of Canada, first elected in 2019.

Provincially, the area is within the constituency of Saskatoon Nutana. It is currently represented by Erika Ritchie of the Saskatchewan New Democratic Party.

In Saskatoon's non-partisan municipal politics, Nutana lies within ward 6. It is currently represented by Councillor Jasmine Parker, first elected in 2024.

== Institutions ==
=== Education ===
Oskāyak High School
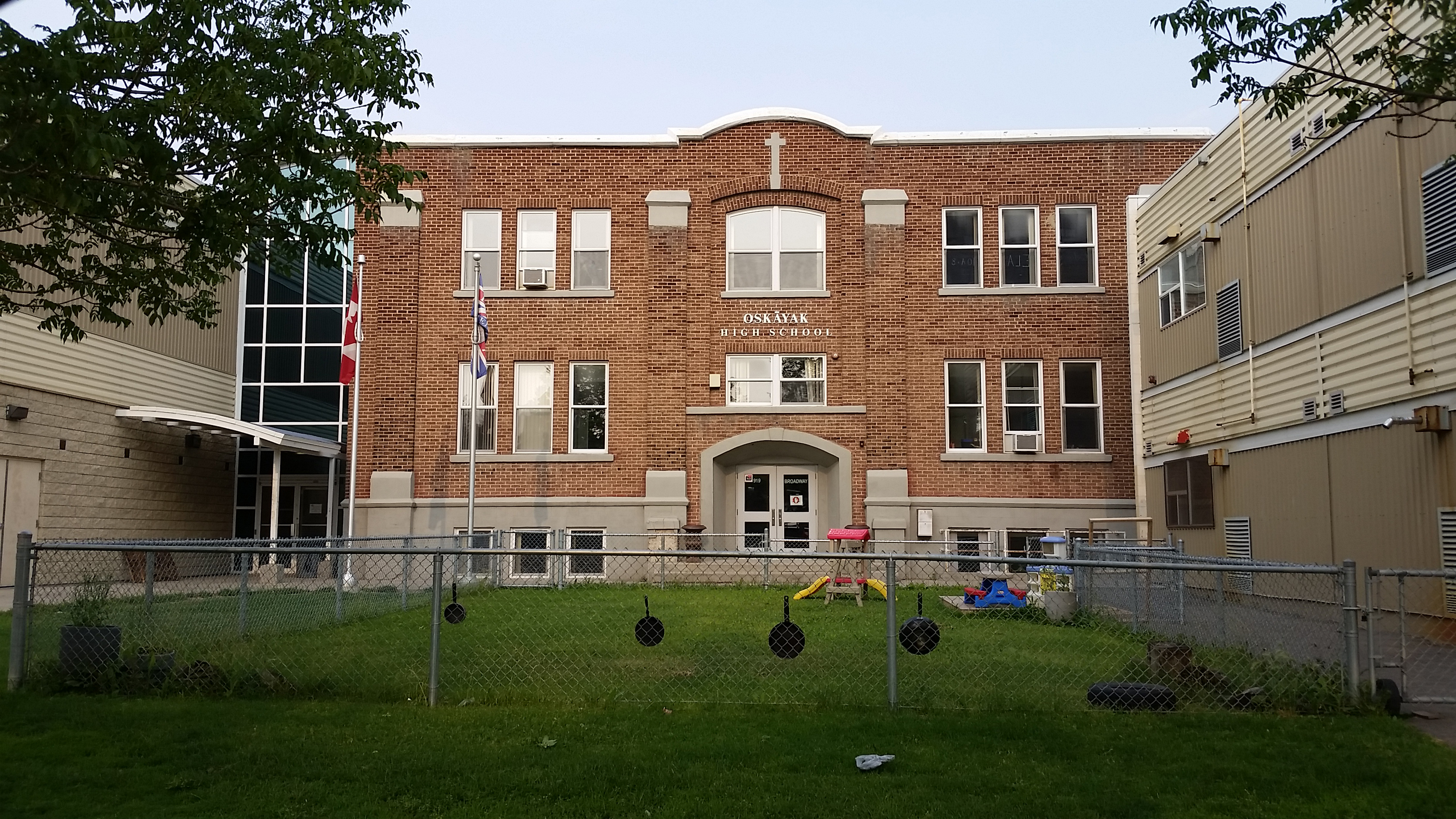

Location
- 919 Broadway Ave; Saskatoon, Saskatchewan, S7N 1B8; Canada; 52.116111°N 106.656219°W

Information
- Type: Secondary, First Nations Cultural Setting
- Religious affiliation: Catholic
- Opened: 1980
- School board: Greater Saskatoon Catholic Schools (Associate School)
- Principal: Jennifer Altenberg
- Grades: Grade 9 to Grade 12
- Enrollment: 351 (2025)
- Education system: Separate
- Language: English, Cree
- Website: Oskāyak High School

École Victoria School
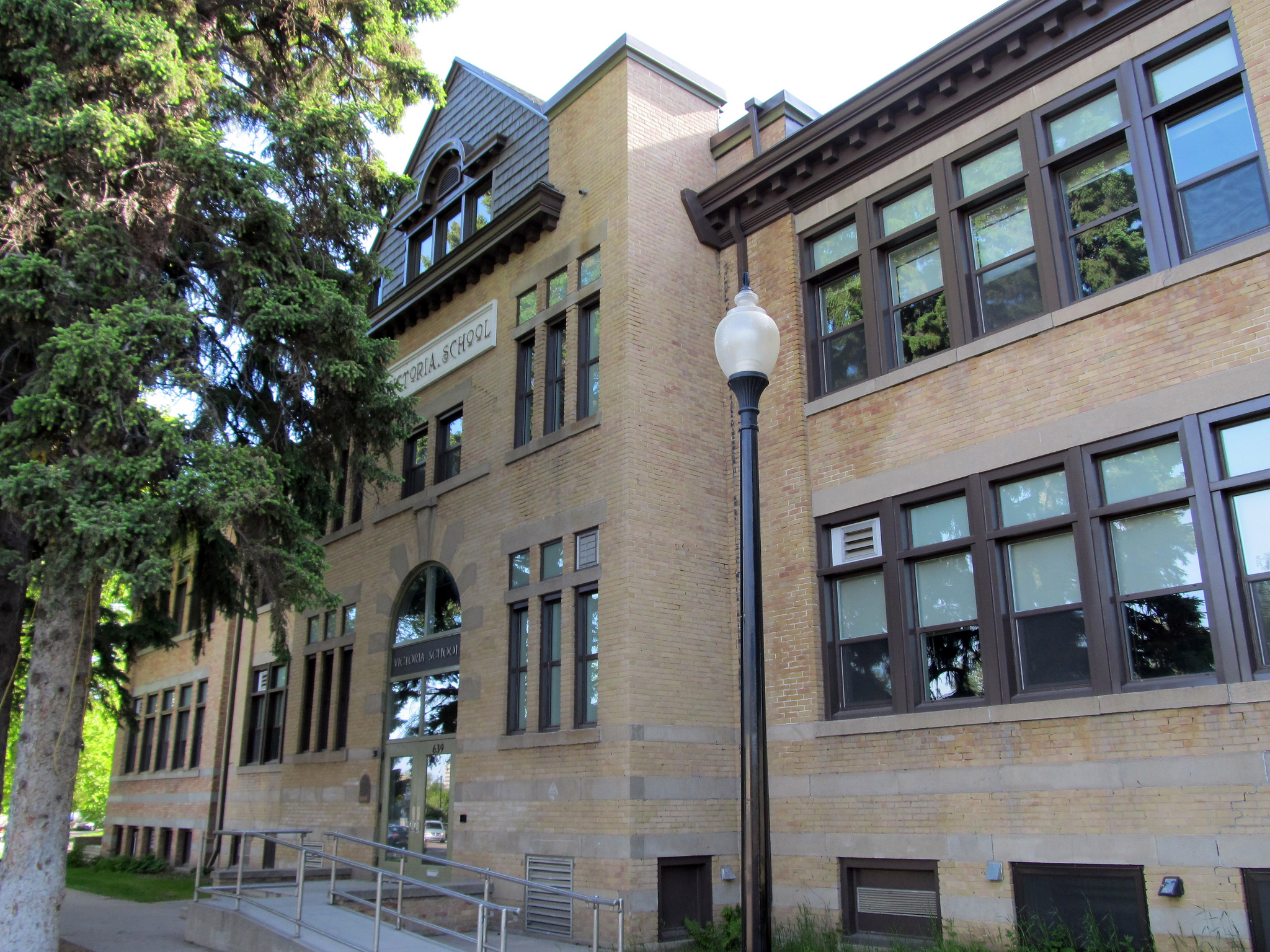
- 639 Broadway Avenue; Saskatoon, Saskatchewan, S7N 1B2; Canada

Information
- Type: Elementary
- Motto: Caring, Excellence, Respect and Responsibility
- School board: Saskatoon Public School Division
- Principal: Deena Shyluk
- Grades: Kindergarten to Grade 8
- Enrollment: 476 (2025)
- Education system: Public
- Language: English, French Immersion
- Feeder to: Aden Bowman Collegiate
- Website: École Victoria School

- Oskāyak High School - separate (Catholic) secondary, associate school of Greater Saskatoon Catholic Schools. Opened as Native Survival School in 1980 and renamed Joe Duquette High School in 1989 after the school's first elder. The school was renamed Oskāyak High School in 2006.
- Nutana Collegiate – public secondary, part of the Saskatoon Public School Division. Nutana Collegiate was Saskatoon's first public secondary school.
- École Victoria School - public elementary, part of the Saskatoon Public School Division

=== Other ===
- Cosmo Seniors' Centre – community hall for special events, operated by the Saskatoon Yellowhead Cosmopolitan Club

== Arts and culture ==
The Broadway Theatre is one of Nutana's cultural cornerstones. A designated municipal heritage property, the Broadway Theatre is Saskatoon's only community-owned and operated cinema and live performance venue.

Originally the parish hall of St. James' Anglican Church, the Refinery Arts & Spirit Centre is a multi-purpose facility that hosts arts and wellness classes and workshops, meetings and conferences, and live performances.

=== Annual events ===
- Bikes on Broadway (May) – the largest road bicycle race in Saskatchewan
- Broadway Art Encounter (June) – a weekend exhibition where local artists display their works inside businesses of the Broadway Avenue business district
- Saskatoon Fringe Theatre Festival (August) – a fringe theatre festival at various venues around Broadway Avenue, as well as free outdoor performance artists and street vendors
- Broadway Street Fair (September) – a festival that includes a sidewalk sale, silent auction, art show, live music, and children's games
- Flicks International Film Festival for Young People (September) – children's film festival at the Broadway Theatre

== Commercial ==
Nutana is anchored around the business district of Broadway Avenue, which was the main street in its early days as a town. Today, Broadway Avenue is home to mainly independently owned local businesses. Some businesses are located on side streets adjacent to Broadway, in particular Main Street, 10th Street and Dufferin Avenue. A few businesses within the 8th Street commercial district lie inside Nutana's southern boundary. There is also a small mini-mall with a grocery store at the corner of 12th Street and Clarence Avenue, and two small commercial developments at Victoria Avenue and Main Street. 87 home-based businesses exist in Nutana.

== Parks and recreation ==
- Poplar Crescent Park – 0.3 acres (0.12 ha)
- Albert Rec. Unit – 0.8 acres (0.32 ha)
- Idywyld Park – 1.0 acre (0.40 ha)
- Massey Park – 1.7 acres (0.69 ha)
- Rotary Park – 12.3 acres (5.0 ha)
- Cosmopolitan Park – 29.3 acres (11.9 ha)

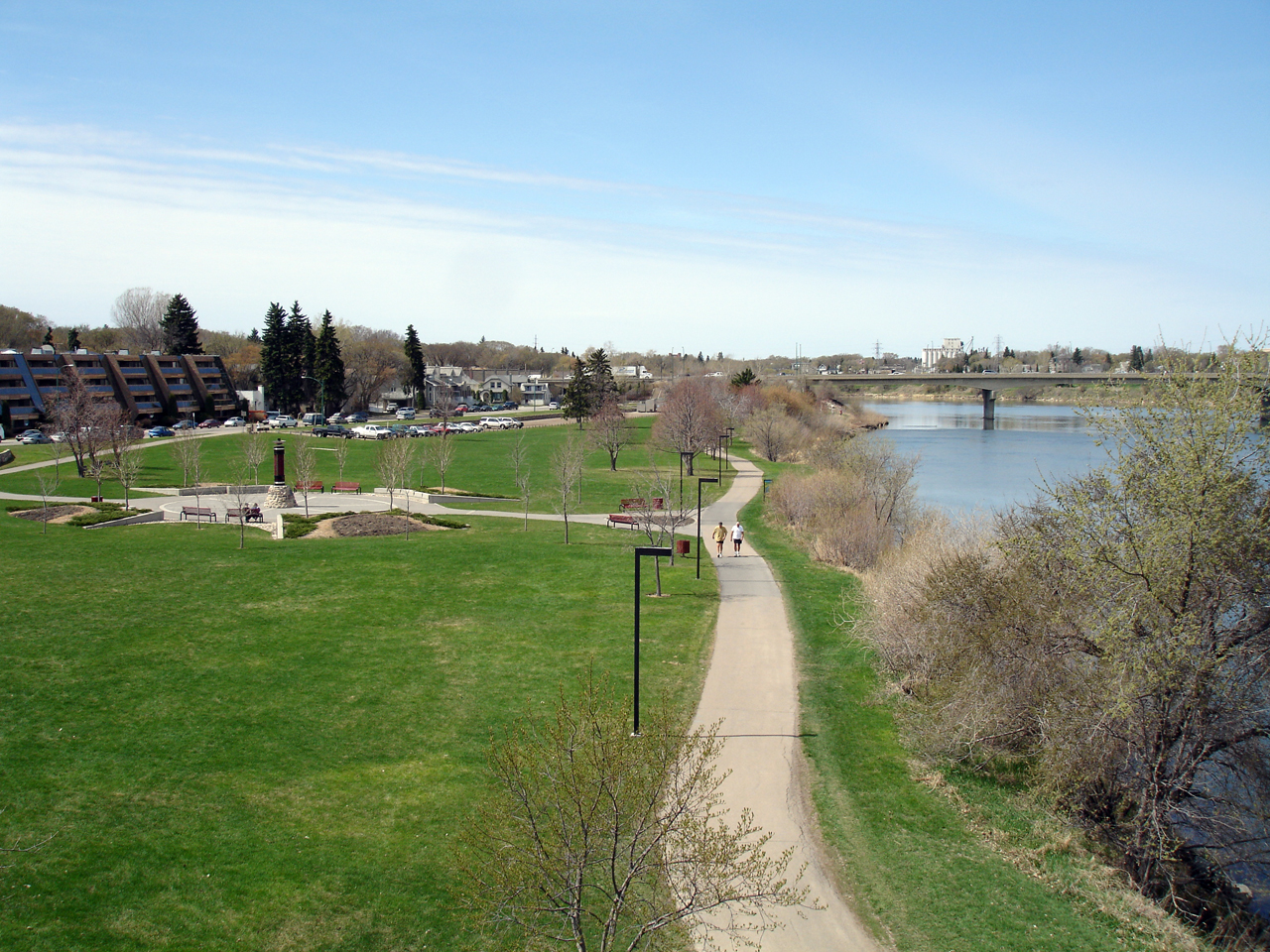

The Nutana Community Association organizes leisure, social, and recreational programs and works with the municipal government to address a variety of local issues.

== Location ==
Nutana is located within the Core Neighbourhoods Suburban Development Area. It is bounded by 8th Street to the south, Clarence Avenue to the east, and the South Saskatchewan River to the west. Roads are laid out in a grid fashion; streets run east–west, avenues run north–south. Some roads close to the river are laid out in rough parallel to the riverbank. All three operational road bridges into the downtown core are located in or immediately adjacent to Nutana; a fourth bridge, the historic Traffic Bridge, was closed and decommissioned in the late 2000s; a replacement bridge opened on the same site in the late 2010s.

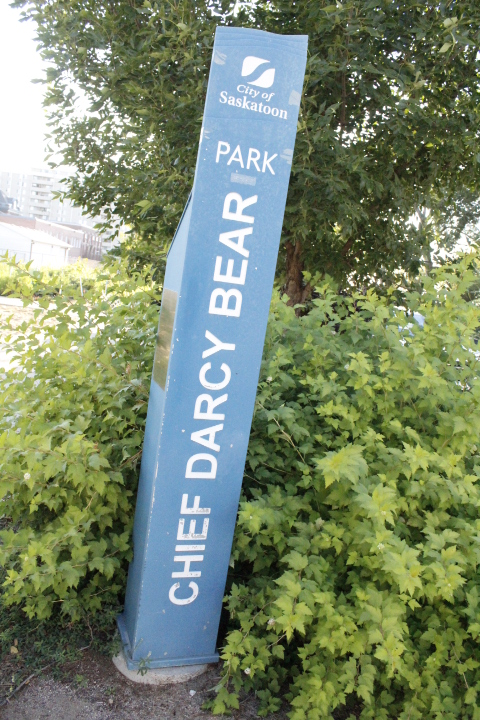

The original 1883 layout of Saskatoon/Nutana was similar to today's boundaries, except it extended south of 8th Street to a then-unnamed road allowance (now Taylor Street), incorporating what is today the neighbourhood of Buena Vista and half of today's Haultain community. Some reference books erroneously refer to the small residential area west of Idylwyld Drive and north of 8th Street (which has always been physically separated from the rest of Nutana by either a rail line or a freeway) by the name, "Idylwyld".
