= Broadway Avenue (Saskatoon) =

Street in Saskatchewan, Canada

Coordinates: 52.120°N 106.657°W

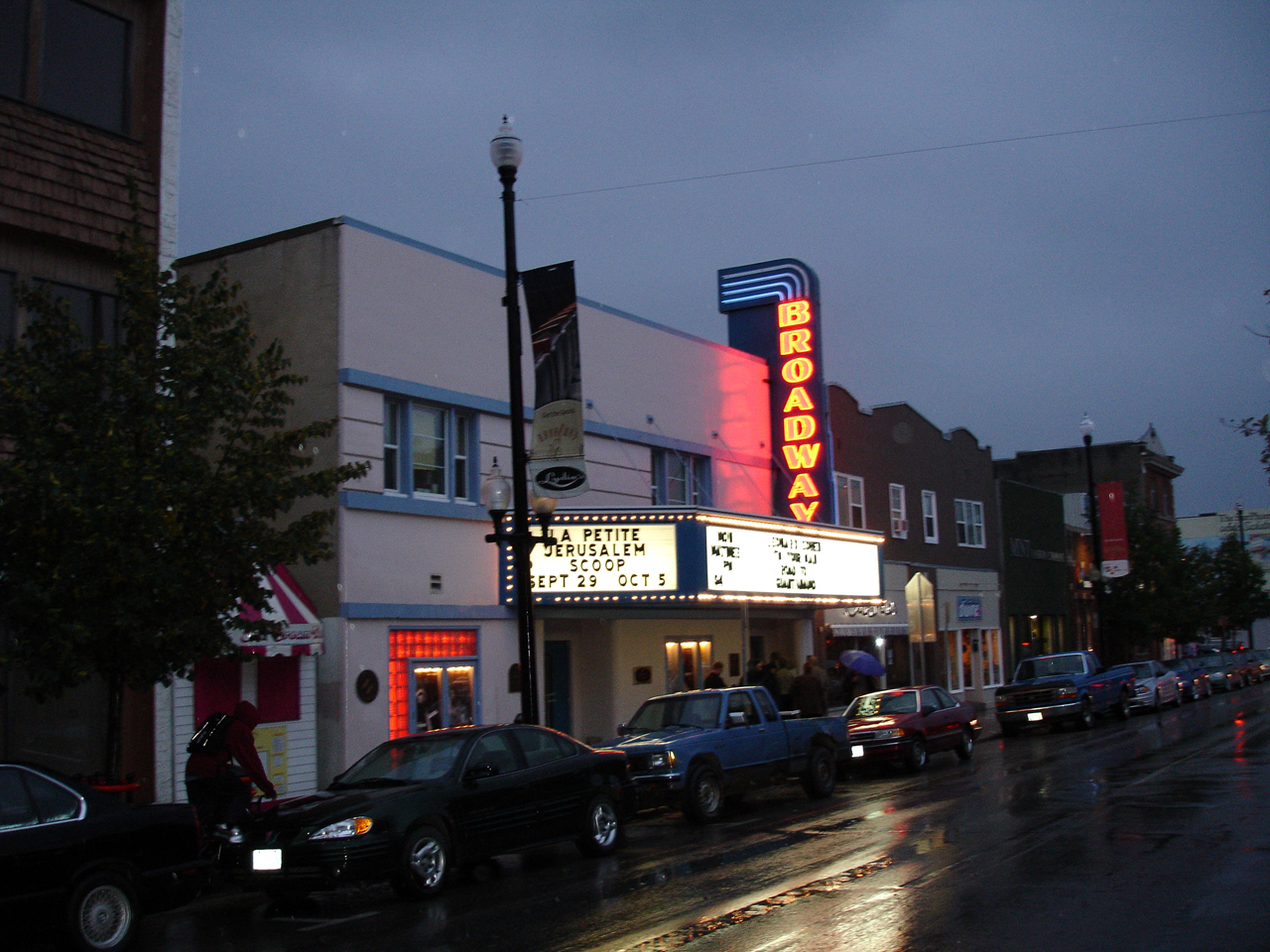
Broadway Theatre on Broadway Avenue

Broadway Avenue is an arterial road and commercial street in Saskatoon, Saskatchewan. It begins at the east end of the Broadway Bridge and continues south for about 4 kilometres until terminating at a cul-de-sac in the Avalon neighbourhood. The commercial portion, and the section usually referred to colloquially as "Broadway," is composed of the five blocks running south from the Broadway Bridge to 8th Street East, as well as the adjoining blocks east and west. This section forms the Broadway Business Improvement District and is a popular shopping and cultural destination in Saskatoon, featuring numerous restaurants and bars, boutique shops, local businesses, and annual street festivals such as the Saskatoon Fringe Theatre Festival.

== History ==
This original portion of Broadway Avenue, between the bridge and 8th Street, was the original main commercial street of the town of Nutana, prior to amalgamation with Saskatoon in 1906. It was also the location of the city's first elementary school, Victoria School. The original stone school was relocated to the grounds of the University of Saskatchewan, but the replacement school built in the 1930s still stands.

Broadway Avenue was so named because of its width, and teams of more than two horses could do U-turns without having to go around the block.

The southernmost portion of Broadway Avenue in Avalon was intended to have a boulevard and be named Royal Avenue. The boulevard was never built and another street in Avalon received the Royal Avenue name (one block west of present-day Broadway between Ruth and Cascade Streets).

Broadway Avenue ceased to be the main commercial street when the present downtown was established with the arrival of the Qu'Appelle, Long Lake and Saskatchewan Railway in 1890. It remained the commercial center for the Nutana and other east side neighbourhoods until the 1950s, when newer shopping malls drew business activity away from Broadway Avenue. The area went into a decades-long period of decline until the mid-1980s. On August 25, 1986, an organization of merchants in the area called the Broadway Business Improvement District (BBID) was formed. One of their first projects was to get the city to pay for half of the estimated $1.1 million to refurbish the street. This included cobblestone medians, park benches, median signs, new paint on the lampposts, antique style lighting and advertisement posts all coordinated in the same theme. It began a period of revitalization that brought renewed commercial activity and gentrification to the Nutana neighbourhood. Broadway Avenue remains an active commercial district to the present day.

== Five Corners ==
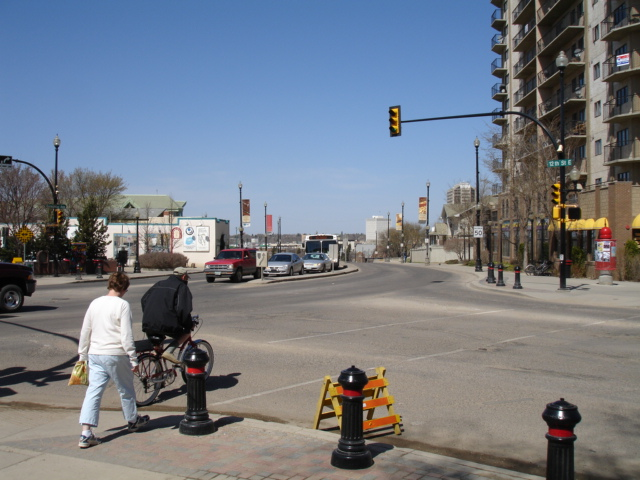
Five Corners intersection

Broadway Avenue's intersection at 12th Street East is often referred to as "Five Corners"; it was originally laid out in 1883. The north extension of Broadway, later renamed University Drive, followed the Batoche Trail parallel to the river, unlike the north-south orientation of Broadway south of 12th Street. The intersection was connected to the "Long Hill" route along Saskatchewan Crescent to the Traffic Bridge, which opened in 1907. This connection created a five-point intersection, and it became an access point to downtown with the completion of the Broadway Bridge in 1932. The Long Hill route to the Traffic Bridge was later replaced by the more direct "Short Hill" route, though due to the grade of the Short Hill, the Long Hill continued to be used by street cars. The intersection was marked for many years by a service station on the north corner that featured signage that could be seen far down Broadway; in the 1970s it was demolished and construction began on an apartment block.

In later years, access from University Drive and the western part of 12th Street East was cut off, changing Five Corners into a standard 3-way junction. The moniker remains, however, and an interpretive sculpture was erected in 2009 by the design studio of Lee-Koopman.
