= Little Chief Service Station =

Coordinates: 52°07′35″N 106°40′29″W

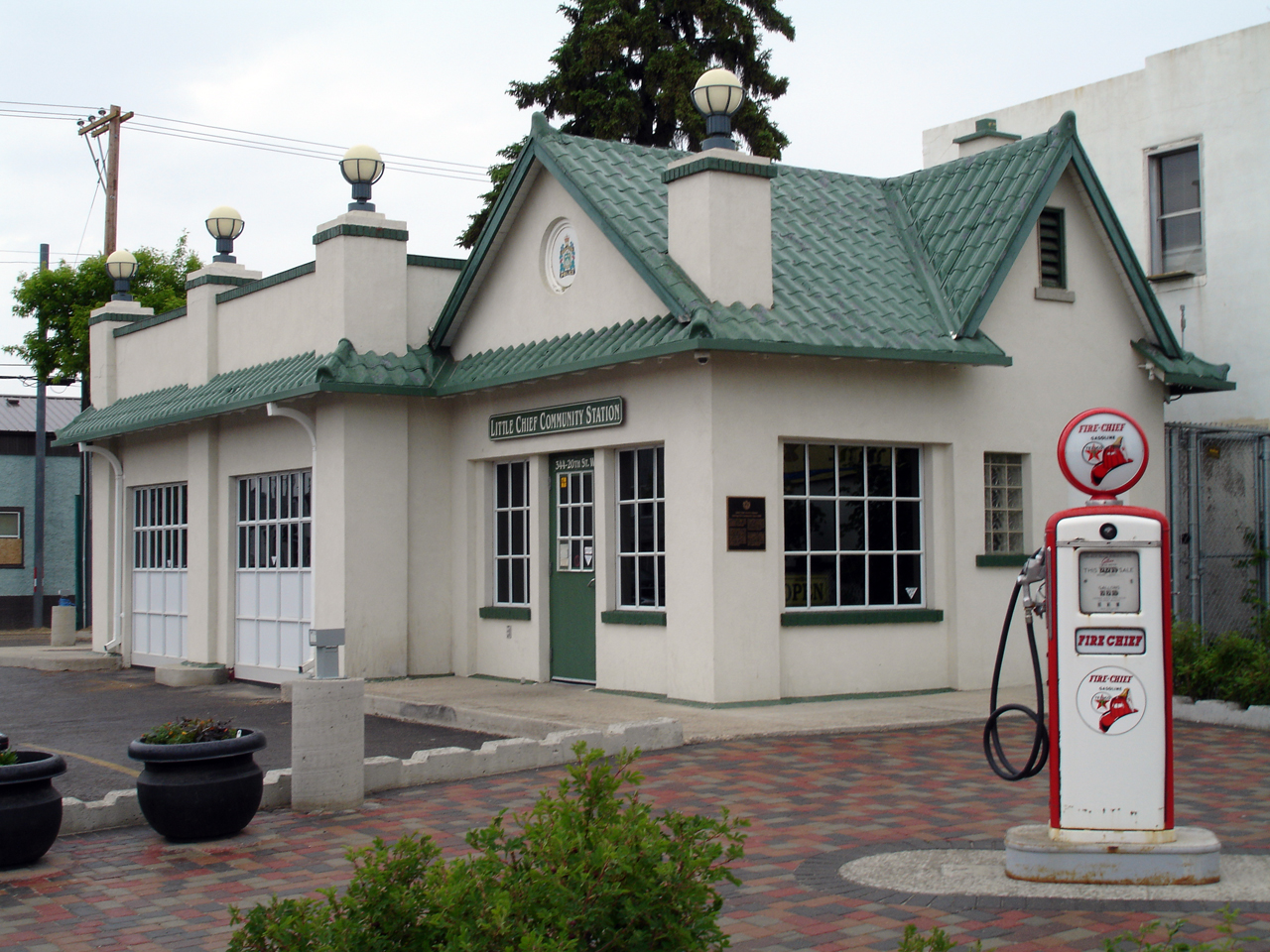
- Little Chief Service Station
- Interactive map of the Little Chief Service Station area

General information
- Architectural style: Spanish Colonial
- Location: 344 20th Street W, Saskatoon, Saskatchewan, Canada
- Construction started: 1929
- Completed: 1929
- Client: Texaco

The Little Chief Service Station (built in 1929) is a designated Municipal Heritage Property located in the Riversdale, neighborhood of Saskatoon, Saskatchewan, Canada. It was originally built as a gas service station for Texaco Oil Company of Canada. Cars and farm vehicles were often serviced at the station while owners shopped in the Riversdale area. The restored building design makes use of white stucco walls, rounded roof tiles, decorative brick, heavy tiled cornices, roof parapets, iron windows and copper gutters.

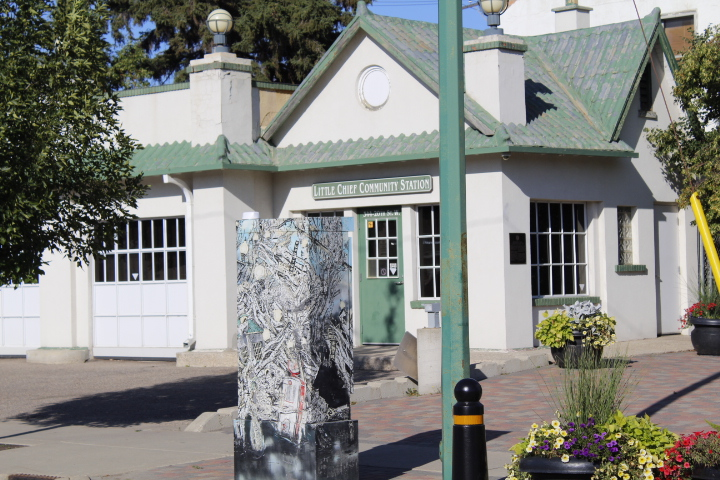

After renovations, the Saskatoon Police Service started using the building as a community policing station on April 29, 2003. In 2011 closing the community policing station was identified as a cost-saving measure, with a focus on having police officers on patrols in the neighborhood. The Riversdale Business Improvement District has been located there since May 2008.
