= Thirteenth Street Terrace =

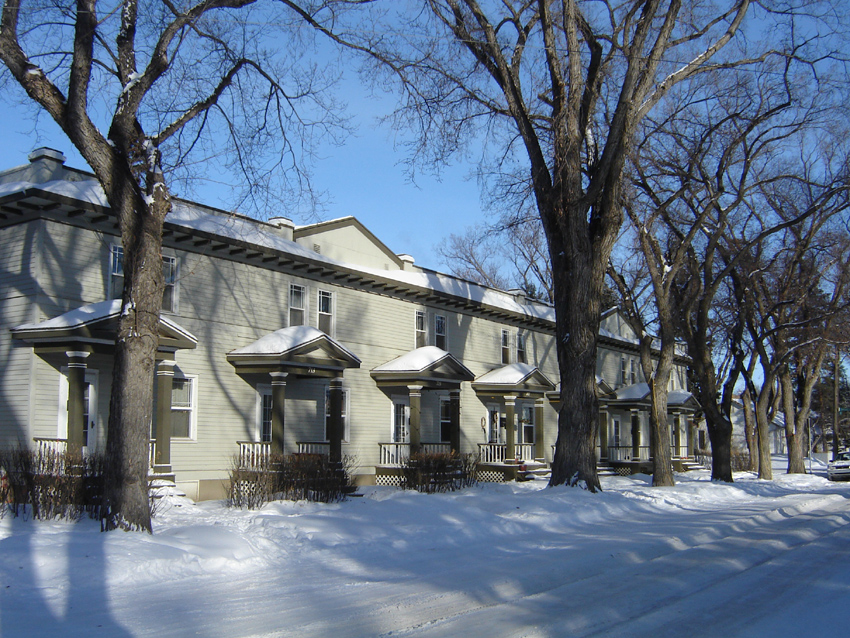
- Thirteenth Street Terrace
- Interactive map of the Thirteenth Street Terrace area

General information
- Location: 711 – 723 13th Street East, Saskatoon, Saskatchewan, Canada
- Coordinates: 52.1210°N 106.6529°W
- Completed: 1911-1912

The Thirteenth Street Terrace is a municipally-designated historic building located in the Nutana neighbourhood of Saskatoon, Saskatchewan, Canada. The property is made up of two-storey row housing constructed between 1911 and 1912 in a Classical architectural style. The row houses were built by Henry A. Cook, liveryman, farmer, real estate salesman and owner of the Waldorf Café.
