= Riversdale, Saskatoon =

Riversdale
- Neighbourhood
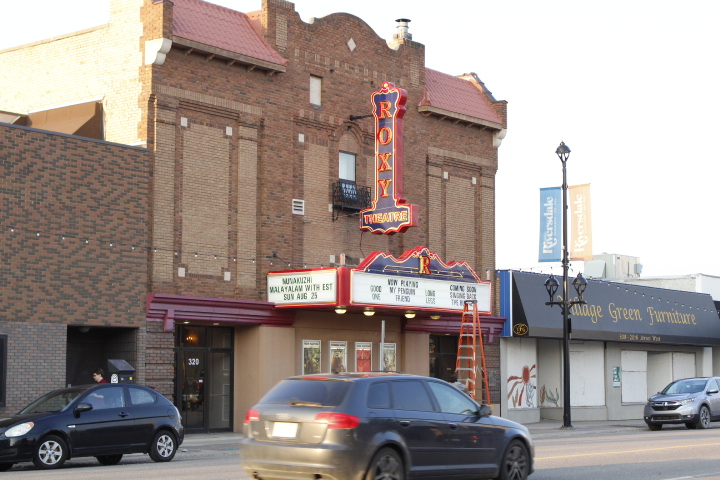
- Roxy Theatre

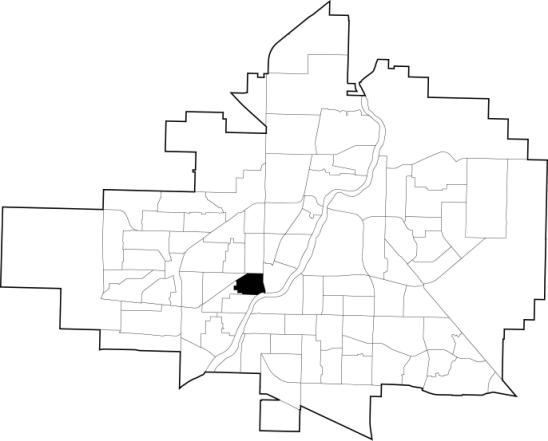
- Riversdale location map
- Coordinates: 52°07′31″N 106°40′43″W
- Country: Canada
- Province: Saskatchewan
- City: Saskatoon
- Sector: Core Neighbourhoods
- Settled: 1890 (as Richville)
- Incorporated (town): 1905 (as Riversdale)
- Incorporated (city): 1906 (as Saskatoon)

Government
  - Type: Municipal (Ward 2)
  - Administrative body: Saskatoon City Council
  - Councillor: Senos Timon
  - MLA: Kim Breckner
  - MP: Brad Redekopp

Area
  - Total: 0.87 km^{2} (0.34 sq mi)

Population (2025)
  - Total: 2,879
  - Density: 3,300/km^{2} (8,600/sq mi)
  - Median personal income: $52,400
- Time zone: UTC-6 (CST)
- Website: Riversdale Community Association

Riversdale is one of the oldest neighbourhoods in Saskatoon, Saskatchewan, Canada, located near the downtown area. It includes the business district of 20th Street. It consists mostly of low-density, single detached dwellings. As of 2024, the area was home to 2,692 residents.

Riversdale has experienced an economic and development boom since 2012 and has even been called Canada's Next Great Neighbourhood. However, the neighbourhood is still considered a lower-income area, with (based on the 2021 Canadian Census) an estimated median personal income of $52,400, an average sale price of $278,835 and an estimated home ownership rate of 46%.

Incorporated as a town in 1905, Riversdale was one of the three original settlements that merged to form the city of Saskatoon in 1906.

== History ==
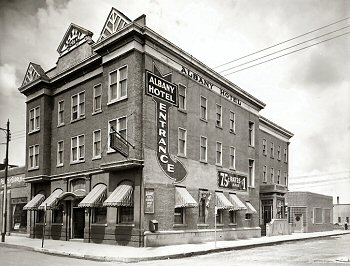
The Albany Hotel in the late 1930s

The first record of settlement in the Riversdale area was in the 1890s, when the area was homesteaded. It was dubbed "Richville" after one of the original settlers. In April 1903, over 1500 Barr Colonists arrived and made camp just west of the railway tracks beside Saskatoon. While most of the colonists moved on to the Lloydminster area, some remained behind as permanent residents of a new settlement. The village of Riversdale was incorporated on January 16, 1905. The village plan (originally called "Riverdale") had narrower streets, smaller lots, and no public reserve land. Faced with a heavy influx of settlers, Riversdale joined with the towns of Saskatoon and Nutana to become the City of Saskatoon on July 1, 1906.

Immigration from central and eastern Europe brought new and ethnically diverse peoples to Riversdale around 1908. Many British, German, Ukrainian and Chinese families took up residence. Separated from the downtown by the Canadian Northern Railway yards, vehicular access to Riversdale was limited to underpasses at 19th and 23rd Streets. In 1910, a pedestrian walkway was built over the train tracks at 20th Street so the public could safely cross the tracks on foot. Saskatoon's Chinatown moved into the Riversdale district in the early 1930s. Originally, Chinese immigrants set up businesses along 19th Street east of the CN tracks, in what is now the south downtown. However, they moved when the city acquired the land to build the Saskatoon Technical Collegiate (later the Gathercole Building, now demolished).

The mid-1960s marked a change in the traffic patterns of the area, as the CN tracks were relocated out of downtown. 20th and 22nd Streets were connected to the downtown, and Idylwyld Drive became Riversdale's eastern boundary. The 23rd Street underpass was levelled quickly, while the 19th Street overpass remained until 2006. The mid-60s also saw First Nations people moving off of reserves and into Riversdale – the most recent statistics show that 43% of the population identifies as being of First Nations origin. Vietnamese and Hong Kong Chinese immigrants also began arriving at this time.

Riversdale's image struggled since the 1960s, with a sizeable portion of the population living below the poverty line. The social ills that accompany poverty – substance abuse, violent crime and dilapidated housing – often cast the area in a negative light. However, by 2009 there was evidence of gentrification occurring in the area, including the River Landing development and the demolition of the historic but run-down Barry Hotel being cited as examples of the neighbourhood's changing character. By 2014, new businesses occupied nearly all of the available rental space.

=== Historic buildings ===
- Albany Hotel (1906) – Originally named the Iroquois Hotel, the business was renamed the Albany Hotel in 1912 after an extensive enlargement and alteration. Over the decades, the Albany gained a reputation as a "seedy" hotel and was the scene of many violent crimes. It closed in the late 1990s, and was acquired by Corrections Canada. Since 2000 it has served as a halfway house for federal offenders, under the name of Meewasinota Community Residence.
- Adilman Building (1912/1949) – Adilman's Department Store was a cornerstone of the 20th Street shopping district from its opening in 1921 until it closed in 1974. The present structure is the result of a 1949 renovation, though the building's core dates to 1912. It is one of Saskatoon's examples of Streamline Moderne architecture. Since the department store closed, it has been home to an antique store, farmer's market, and bingo hall. In 2014 Freedom Functional Fitness, an unconventional fitness gym moved into the building. Currently, it houses Anthology Home Collection, a high-end home décor shop and the Bagel Shop.
- Landa House (1912) – An attractive example of the Prairie Vernacular style, the house was first occupied by Saskatoon fire chief Thomas E. Heath. In 1921, the house was acquired by William and Fanny Landa, who were Jewish immigrants from Russia. William had opened a blacksmith shop in 1908, then expanded his business to manufacture buggies and wagons, which became Landa Auto Body Works. The business operates to this day at its original location on Avenue C. The house was designated a municipal heritage property on November 28, 2005.
- Wesley Methodist Church (1911) – Built 1911, it was designed by architect Frank P. Martin. In the beginning it was known as Riversdale Methodist Church. The congregation united in 1930 with St. Thomas Presbyterian Church to become St. Thomas Wesley United Church. Wesley Methodist Church traces its beginnings to November 1906 and a decision by Third Avenue Methodist Church to establish a mission in Riversdale. A building committee was struck and a wooden structure was erected on the north-west corner of Avenue G and 19th Street. This original wood structure was incorporated into the large brick church constructed in 1911. A feature of the church was the gallery which extended on two sides of the building. When the accordion doors between the church and Wesley Hall were opened the Church and the hall became one large auditorium.
- St. Thomas Wesley United Church (1912) – Built on the corner of Avenue H and 20th Street in 1912, it was originally St. Thomas Presbyterian Church, named in honour of Thomas Copland, a civic and church leader. This red brick structure with Romanesque windows and a square bell tower, is topped with a stucco and wood belfry. In 1930 an agreement was reached between St. Thomas Presbyterian and Wesley Methodist to worship in the St. Thomas building under joint ministry – they formed St. Thomas Wesley United Church in 1934. The wood and stucco bell tower was removed in 2008 after falling into disrepair.
- Little Chief Service Station (1929) – Built as a Texaco service station in the 1920s, this building was built in the Spanish Colonial style. It features white stucco walls, rounded roof tiles, decorative brick, heavy tiled cornices, roof parapets, iron windows and copper gutters. It was named the West Side Service Station until 1943, when the name was changed to the Little Chief Service Station. After it ceased to be a service station, the Saskatoon Police Service obtained and renovated the building for use as a community police station. It was designated a municipal heritage property on January 11, 1982.
- Roxy Theatre (1930) – It was built during the onset of the Great Depression. The interior was decorated in a Spanish Villa style with the walls covered with small balconies, windows and towers that gave the impression of a quaint Spanish village. The ceiling was painted dark blue and had twinkling lights set in the plaster to give the impression of the night sky. The Roxy was for a time called the Towne Cinema, then closed in 1995. It was purchased and restored by Magic Lantern Theatres, and reopened under its original name in 2005.
- Ukrainian National Federation Hall (1932) – The hall with its distinctive entryway lions, featured ornate interior decorations that ranged from busts of famous artists, musicians, and leaders, through to a stage flanked with castle-like walls. The building was used mainly for weddings, banquets, concerts and other public gatherings.
- Ukrainian Orthodox Cathedral of the Holy Trinity (1952) – The church features an eight-sided dome which depicts the major feasts of the Church and Saints. 22-karat gold was used to decorate the church's icons. In 1988 the front of the cathedral gained a bronze statue of St. Volodymyr, the Baptizer of Ukraine.
- Ukrainian Catholic Cathedral of St. George - In 1910 the first Ukrainian settlers began arriving in Saskatoon and its outlying areas. An organizational meeting of the Ukrainian Catholic Parish of St. George was held on September 29, 1912 at which time its first Executive was elected. In the same year 40 people were registered as members.
- The Shrine of the Vulnerable Nun-Martyrs Olympia and Laurentia. The Ukrainian Sisters of St. Joseph operate Shrine of the Vulnerable Nun Martyrs Olympia and Laurentia. Located at the Monastery on Avenue N South, the Shrine houses the first-class relics of Blessed Olympia Beda and Blessed Laurentia Harasymiv, two nuns who died in Soviet labour camps and were beatified by Pope John Paul II in 2001.

== Government and politics ==
Riversdale is in the federal electoral district of Saskatoon West. It is represented by Brad Redekopp of the Conservative Party of Canada, first elected in 2019.

Provincially, the area overlaps two constituencies. The southwest portion lies within the constituency of Saskatoon Riversdale. It is currently represented by Kim Breckner of the Saskatchewan New Democratic Party, first elected in the 2024 election. The northeast portion of the area lies within the constituency of Saskatoon Centre. It is represented by Betty Nippi-Albright of the Saskatchewan New Democratic Party, first elected in a 2020 by-election.

In Saskatoon's non-partisan municipal politics, Riversdale lies within ward 2. It is currently represented by Senos Timon, first elected in 2024.

== Institutions ==
=== Education ===
Construction of Riversdale's first school (Riversdale School) began in 1906/07 and was later renamed Alexandra School. A four-room school house was erected, and doubled in size by 1908. In 1922 there were both Princess and Alexandra schools in operation on the same land allotment. Princess School was sold and torn down in 1961. In 1962 a new school building named Princess Alexandra School was erected on the same property site, and re-opened.

Princess Alexandra School was closed and demolished in 2022 to prepare for the construction of a new city centre school. The new school on the former site at 210 Ave H S will be an amalgamation of the original Princess Alexandra school along with nearby King George and Pleasant Hill schools.

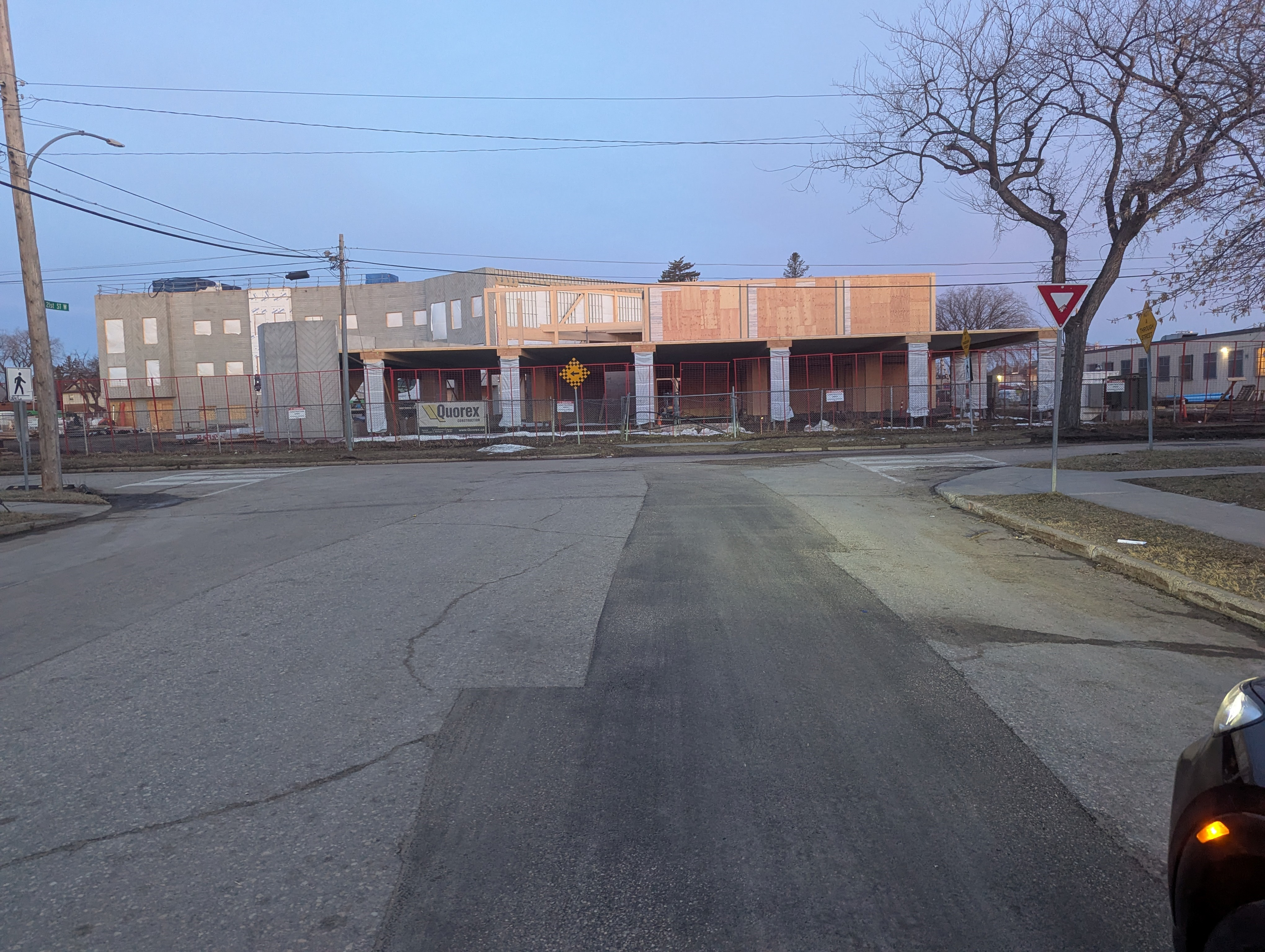
Constuction of new Princess Alexendra School

Construction for the new school began in June 2025 and is scheduled for completion in 2027. In February 2026, Saskatoon Public Schools announced the new school will be officially named misiwe-kisik | One Sky.

=== Public safety ===
- Fire Hall No. 1 – fire station and headquarters of Saskatoon Fire & Protective Services

=== Other ===
- Riversdale House – seniors housing complex
- White Buffalo Youth Lodge – Opened in 2000, this integrated service facility provides programming for Aboriginal youth. Health, recreation, life skills, vocational training and counselling programs are available.
- Salvation Army Community Centre – In 1926 the Salvation Army opened what was then known as the "Relief Office" at 335 Avenue C South. By 1932 it was known as The Salvation Army Men's Hostel and Industrial Store where in 1943, had room for 40 men. In 1962 the centre had moved next door to its current location at 339 Avenue C South. Over the next several decades a chapel, half-way house, rehab unit, and more property was added until the centre took its current form.

== Arts and culture ==
- AKA Artist Run Centre – AKA evolved from the Shoestring Gallery, started in 1971. In 1982 the transition from a member-based visual arts and crafts co-operative to a non-profit artist-run centre yielded AKA Gallery.
- La Troupe du Jour – Formed in 1985, La Troupe du Jour is Saskatchewan's only professional francophone theatre company.
- PAVED Arts – PAVED Arts began on March 31, 2003 with the legal amalgamation of The Photographers Gallery (TPG) and Video Vérité (VV), the former a photography resource and exhibition centre, the latter a media access centre.
- Roxy Theatre – Restored and re-opened in 2005, the Roxy Theatre shows movies daily; it has weekend matinees and hosts several live and musical events & promotions throughout the year.
- Saskatchewan Native Theatre Company – Launched in 1999, the SNTC creates, develops and produces artistic presentations by Canadian Aboriginal artists.
- Riverhouse ArtGallery - located at 308 Spadina Crescent West. Is a professional artist who has trained extensively under many internationally renowned water colorists. Her artistic journey started in 1970, with a Commercial Art Course in Brandon, Manitoba.

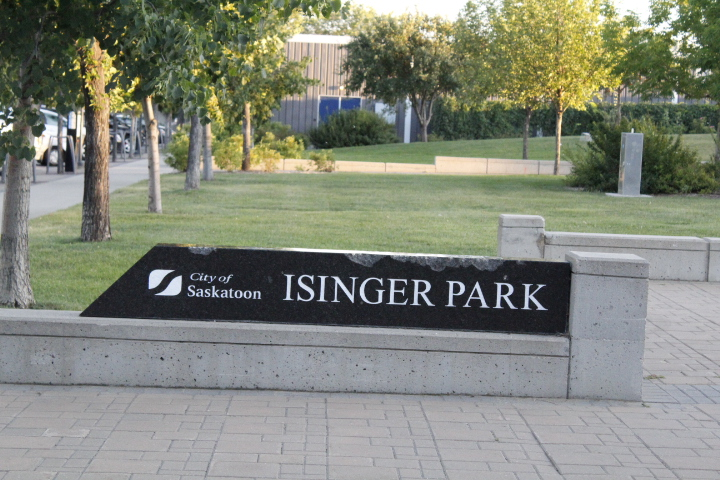
Isinger Park, August 2024

== Parks and recreation ==
- Victoria Park (7.0 acres) – named for Queen Victoria, this public park houses many facilities; however, only a small portion of the park lies within Riversdale; the majority of the park is in the King George neighbourhood to the south.
- Optimist Park (7.1 acres)
- Isinger Park (2.5-acre (1.0 ha)) – built as part of Phase II of the River Landing development, opened in August 2009

The Riversdale Community Association coordinates educational, recreational, and social programs for residents, maintains the outdoor rink at Princess Alexandra Community School, stages fundraising events, and works to address issues of local concern.

== Commercial ==
Riversdale's main commercial corridor is 20th Street, which was the main street in its early days as a village. Today, 20th Street is home to mainly independently-owned local businesses. Other businesses are located on 22nd Street, the major arterial road that makes up the northern boundary of Riversdale. Commercial and light industrial businesses occupy some of the blocks between 19th and 22nd Streets, concentrated on the eastern side closer to Idylwyld Drive. The Saskatoon Farmers' Market, founded in 1975, moved into the Riverlanding location at 19th Street and Avenue B in 2007, and moved to present location in 2019. As of 2022 the previous Farmers Market Location is being refurbished to house Gather Local Market, operated by Ideas Inc.

== Transportation ==
Riversdale is served by Saskatoon Transit bus routes #2, #9 #10, #60 and #65. Route #5 also runs along 23rd Street, a block north of the neighbourhood boundary.

== Location ==
Riversdale is in the Core Neighbourhoods Suburban Development Area. It is bounded by 22nd Street to the north and Idylwyld Drive to the east. The southern boundary starts at the Senator Sid Buckwold Bridge, follows the South Saskatchewan River to 16th Street. Avenue K serves as the neighbourhood's western boundary. Roads are laid out in a grid fashion; streets run east-west, avenues run north-south.
