= Saskatoon Fringe Festival =

Fringe festival in Saskatchewan

Coordinates: 52.1200°N 106.6569°W

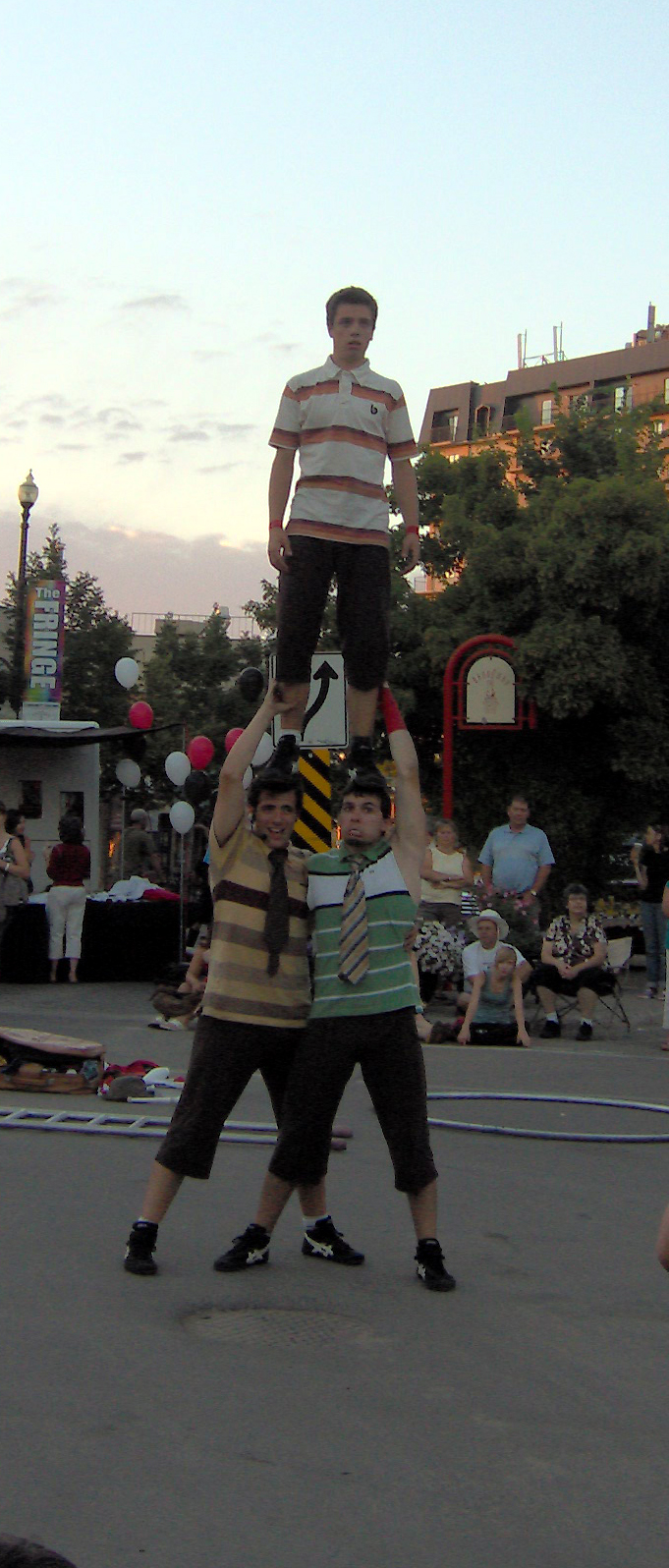
- Street Performers
- Genre: Fringe Theatre Festival
- Dates: mid-August
- Locations: Saskatoon, Saskatchewan; Canada
- Years active: 1990 – present
- Website: Saskatoon Fringe Theatre Festival

The Saskatoon Fringe Festival produced by 25th Street Theatre is an annual Fringe theatre festival in Saskatoon, Saskatchewan, Canada. A Fringe Festival is not censored, and not juried, provides live theatre inexpensively, and a public busking forum for musicians. The 10-day international theatre, arts, and culture Festival is hosted annually in the Broadway District in the Nutana neighborhood.

The Festival is open from August 3rd - 12th, 2023. The event is located W.E. Graham Park and on 11th Street East in Saskatoon, and will expand onto Broadway Avenue for August 5th and 6th. The 2023 theatre venues include The Broadway Theatre, The Refinery Arts Centre, and The Cosmo Civic Seniors Centre.

The festival is a major tourism destination drawing 40-50,000 people attend the site each year.

== General ==
The Saskatoon Fringe Festival is held in July / August annually in Saskatoon. The indoor Festival features independent theatre from around the world, Canada, and Saskatchewan in a schedule of 126 live theatre performances. The Festival also includes Saskatoon's only ten-day outdoor street fair. The street fair is entirely free to access and is stocked full of local food vendors, artisan vendors, community organizations, musicians, and outdoor performers.

The show schedule typically features 18 theatre groups with the slots equally allocated to Saskatchewan artists, national artists, and international artists. The selection process is a lottery system. The artist call opens in the fall/winter prior to the upcoming Festival annually. Information and registration forms are available online at www.25thstreettheatre.org

== History ==
The Saskatoon Fringe Festival was created and was first launched and produced by 25th Street Theatre Artistic Director Tom Bentley-Fisher. The first (mini) Fringe was held in the summer of 1989 in the Duchess Street theatre venue in Saskatoon, as touring Fringe theatre artists between Winnipeg and Edmonton's Fringe sought performance opportunities in Saskatoon. In 1990, the Fringe moved to its regular Broadway Avenue venues to great success with a 6,000-seat audience in its first full offering of theatre.

Saskatoon now hosts one of the top ten Fringes in North America by artist earnings and has garnered a reputation as one of the favourites on the Canadian Fringe tour.
