= Arrand Block =

Coordinates: 52.11860°N 106.65777°W

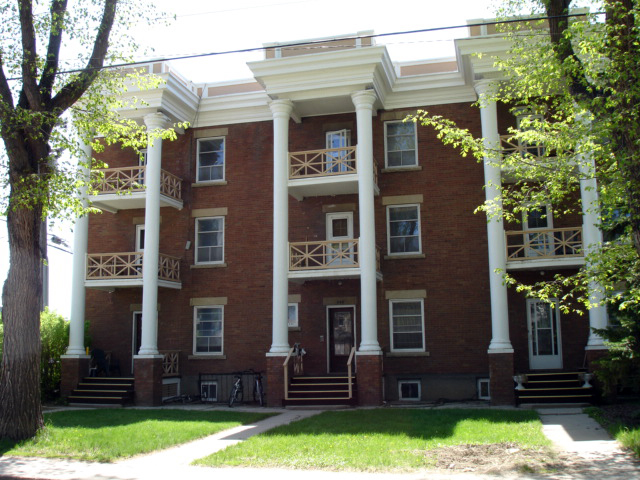
- Arrand Block
- Interactive map of the Arrand Block area

General information
- Architectural style: Neo-Classical
- Location: 520-524 11th Street East, Saskatoon, Saskatchewan, Canada
- Completed: 1912
- Client: James and Walter T. Arrand

The Arrand Block is a historic building located in the Nutana neighborhood of Saskatoon, Saskatchewan, Canada. The building was built by James and Walter T. Arrand, owners of the James and Walter T. Arrand Contractors' Company; Arrand Construction Company intended to use two of the apartments as their homes. Original features of the building include two story apartments, with sky lights on the top floor. The building was designated a heritage property on April 10, 1989.
