= Broadway Theatre (Saskatoon) =

Theatre in Saskatchewan, Canada

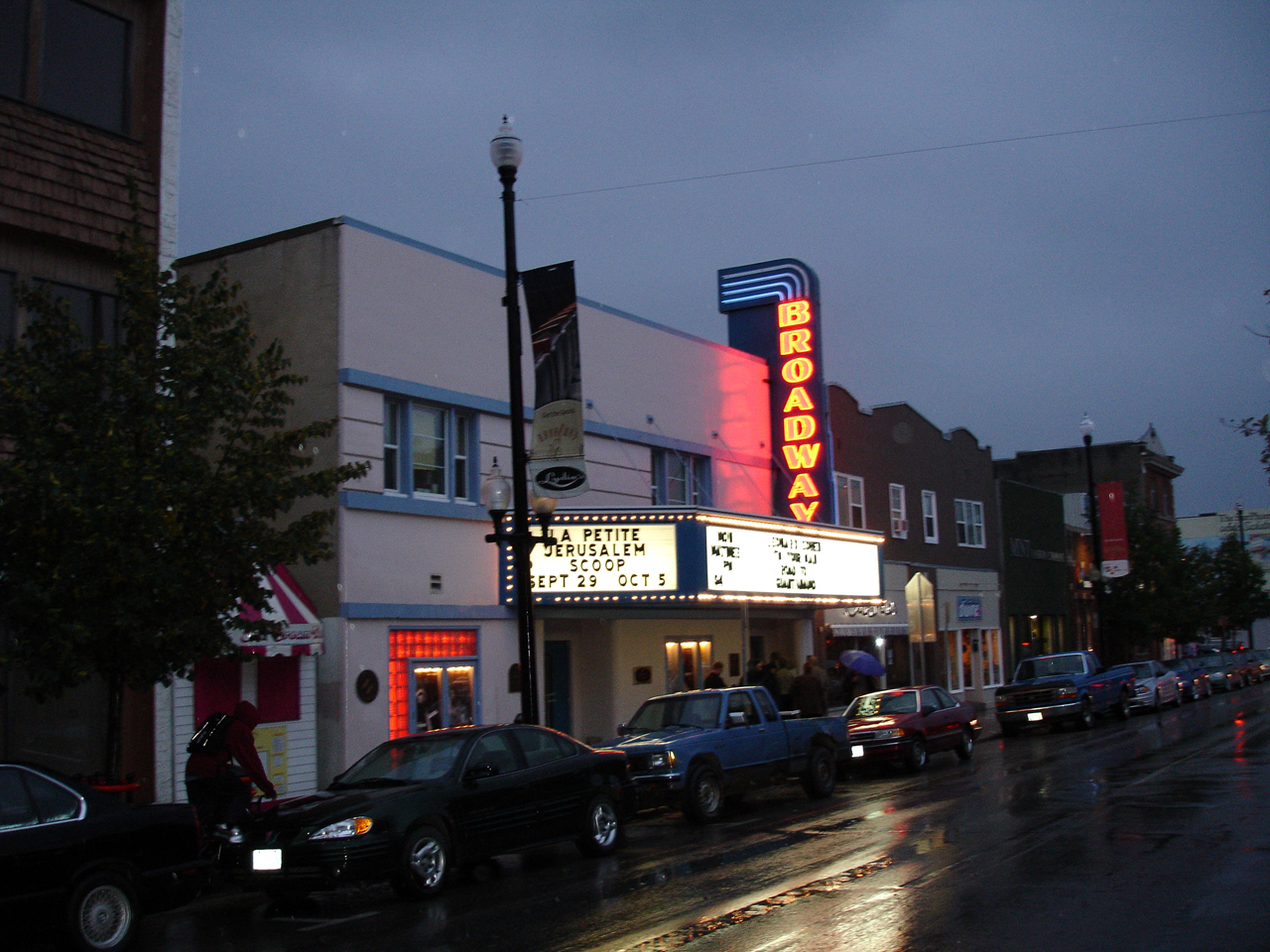
- Interactive map of Broadway Theatre
- Address: 715 Broadway Avenue
- Location: Saskatoon, Saskatchewan, Canada
- Coordinates: 52°07′06″N 106°39′23″W
- Owner: Friends of the Broadway Theatre, Inc.
- Seating type: Fixed seats
- Capacity: 430
- Type: Movie palace, Performing arts center
- Event: Art cinema

Construction
- Built: 1946
- Opened: December 5, 1946
- Closed: August 2, 1993 (re-opened October 1993)

Website
- www.broadwaytheatre.ca

The Broadway Theatre is an art film and performance theatre located on Broadway Avenue in the Nutana neighborhood of Saskatoon, Saskatchewan, Canada. The theatre is Canada's only community-owned non-profit repertory cinema.

== History ==
The Streamline Moderne style movie theatre was designed by George Forrester with the architectural firm of Webster and Gilbert and opened on December 5, 1946. The theatre was Broadway's entertainment destination during the post-World War II years. It screened popular movies of the period and hosted some live musical performances on the stage in front of the movie screen. Following the neighbourhood's decline starting in the 1950s, the theatre fell into disrepute by the 1970s when it became an "adult" movie theatre. It was restored as an art film cinema and live performance venue during the 1980s. It was designated a municipal heritage property on April 14, 1997.

On August 2, 1993, the Broadway Theatre abruptly closed. After a public fundraising drive, it was purchased by the Friends of the Broadway Theatre, Inc., a non-profit organization with charitable status dedicated to the preservation and renovation of the theatre. It reopened in October 1993, resuming its previous role. In addition to art, Canadian and regional cinema, the theatre also hosts some live music performances.

== Facility ==
The theatre seats 240 in a centre bank of seats with another 95 in each of the side banks for a total of 430 seats, plus 6 wheelchair stations. The stage is of a proscenium style, made of black masonite and measures 10.79 metres (35.4 ft) wide and 7.32 metres (24.0 ft) deep. The movie screen is 7.8 metres (26 ft) wide by 3.77 metres (12.4 ft) high, with a projection throw of 31.39 metres (103.0 ft). The lobby has terrazzo flooring and recessed valance lighting around the doorways to the theatre area.

== Operators ==
The theatre changed hands and focus several times, including:

- 1947–1959 Odeon
- 1967–1975 Famous Players
- 1977–1983 Adult movie theatre
- 1984–1993 Still Reel Cinema, Chris Jones and Guy Edlund
- 1987 Movie theatre
- 1993 Friends of the Broadway
