= Gustin House =

Gustin House (including Trounce House)
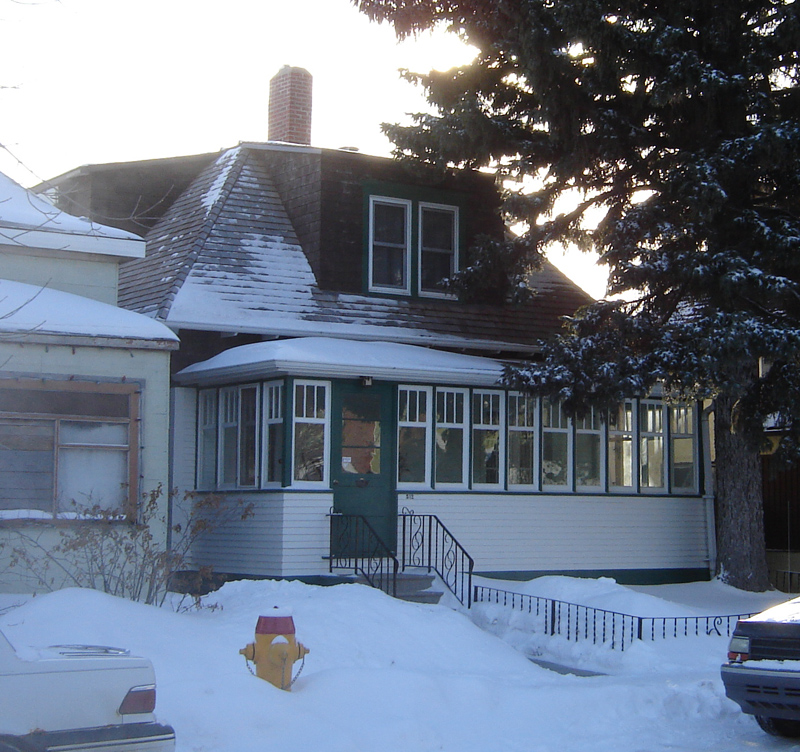
- Gustin House
- Interactive map of the Gustin House (including Trounce House) area

General information
- Status: Completed
- Location: 512 10th Street East, Saskatoon, Saskatchewan, Canada
- Coordinates: 52°7′3.4″N 106°39′31.9″W
- Completed: Gustin (1920); Trounce (1883)

Website
- www.gustinhouse.ca

Gustin House is a municipal and provincial designated historic building located in the Nutana neighborhood of Saskatoon, Saskatchewan, Canada. Trounce House, also a historic building, is located in the backyard of the Gustin House property.

Gustin House is a 1920s style residential home with a special piano studio that connects to the main living room by sliding glass doors, permitting the use of the combined space for performances. In 1928 a back extension was constructed permitting a second rear piano studio to be added, the first remaining in the living room at the front of the house inside the veranda, with a library between the rooms. Dr Gustin's summer-class students also used the piano in Grace-Westminster United Church across the street at the corner of Eastlake Avenue—Westminster Church on 12th Street having closed in the mid-1960s.

Built for Dr. Lyell Gustin (1895–1988), pianist and music teacher, the space was used to teach amateur and professional musicians over a period of 70 years. Between some 357 of the students taught by Lyell Gustin over 465 diplomas from Canadian and English music examining boards were awarded.

In 1988, after the death of Lyell Gustin, the house was left to the University of Saskatchewan. Initially the university only intended to preserve the two Steinway pianos and portraits as a memorial. However, the university was persuaded to sell the building and its other contents to one of his former students, Lloyd Rodwell, who donated the assets to the Gustin/Trounce Heritage Committee. The committee now operates the home as an office to organize recitals in the city, while permitting it to be used to display artifacts of Lyell Gustin, for meeting space used by the local music community and hosting chamber music recitals.

== Trounce House ==
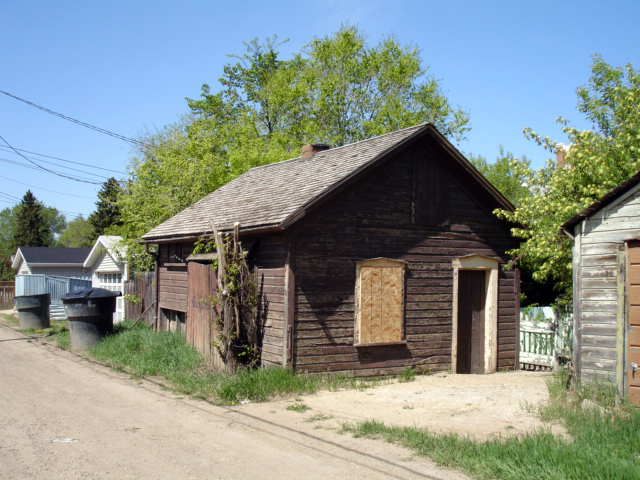
Trounce House

Trounce House (1883) is the oldest known building in Saskatoon; one of a set of six originally built to house settlers from the Temperance Colonization Society. The home was built for John Conn, however he never lived in it. It was sold in 1884 to Harry and Bessie Trounce. In 1885, one of the three rooms was used as a retail store, making it the first retail establishment housed in a building within the city. The home was built from the first shipment of wood shipped to the Temperance Colonization Society that initially settled Saskatoon. In 1920, the building was moved from the front to the back of the current lot (permitting the Gustin House to be built in its place) and converted into a garage.
