= Lyell Gustin =

Canadian pianist and teacher (1895–1988)

Lyell Gustin SOM
- Born: Lyell Adams Raphael Gustin; May 31, 1895; Fitch Bay, Quebec, Canada
- Died: February 7, 1988 (aged 92); Saskatoon, Saskatchewan, Canada
- Occupations: Pianist, music instructor

Lyell Gustin (May 31, 1895 – February 8, 1988) SOM was a pianist, teacher and adjudicator active in Saskatoon, Saskatchewan, from 1920 to the mid-1980s.

== Early life ==
Gustin was born on May 31, 1895, in Fitch Bay, Quebec. He was educated there and at Stanstead College, where in 1912 he graduated with the highest marks in Canada for music diploma examinations. That same year he moved with his family to Saskatoon, where he studied for four years with Blanche St. John-Baker, a pupil of Leopold Godowsky. During the next four years, he studied with Jeannette Durno (a Canadian-born pupil of Theodor Leschetizky) in Chicago, and with Madeley Richardson in New York City and London.

== Teaching career ==
Back problems prevented Gustin from becoming a concert pianist, so he became a piano instructor. Returning to Saskatoon in 1920, he established the Lyell Gustin Piano Studios, operated out of his house that was built the same year. Gustin House was designated a municipal heritage property in 1989.

Gustin served as an examiner for the Western Board of Music (now Conservatory Canada) and Toronto Conservatory and as a festival adjudicator. He was an executive member of the Saskatchewan Registered Music Teachers' Association and the Canadian Federation of Music Teachers' Association. In 1942 he was an originator of the Young Artist Competition, a concert tour to provide experience for young musicians, sponsored by the CFMTA. Gustin was a lecturer at the University of Regina and University of Saskatchewan. He also served as president of the CFMTA (1941–1946) and chaired the music committee (1952–1964) of the Saskatchewan Arts Board.

Gustin held monthly recitals where his music students were exposed to other forms of art, such as painting and literature. These were often done in partnership with his friend, painter Ernest Lindner.

Gustin was the subject of two documentaries: A Man and his Music by CFQC television in 1975, and in 1976 by CBC Radio.

== Notable students ==
- Garth Beckett
- Reginald Bedford
- Shirley Carlson
- Neil Chotem
- Robert Fleming
- Boyd McDonald
- Marguerita Spencer
- Paul de Margerie

== Awards ==
Gustin received several honours during his life, including:

- University of Alberta National Music Award (1955)
- Honorary degree from the University of Saskatchewan (1969)
- Canadian Music Council Medal (1973)
- Honorary fellow of Trinity College, London (1978)
- Canadian Conference of the Arts Diplôme d’honneur (1983)
- Saskatchewan Order of Merit (1986)
