= Landa Residence =

Coordinates: 52°07′39″N 106°40′34″W

- Interactive map of the Landa Residence area

General information
- Architectural style: Prairie Vernacular
- Location: 202 Avenue E South, Saskatoon, Saskatchewan, Canada
- Construction started: 1911
- Completed: 1913

The Landa Residence (built 1911–1913) is a designated Municipal Heritage Property located in the Riversdale, neighborhood of Saskatoon, Saskatchewan, Canada. Thomas E. Heath, Saskatoon's Early Fire Chief lived in the home from 1913–1915. In 1921, the house became the family residence of William and Fanny Landa, the first Jewish family to settle in Saskatoon. William Landa was a carriage maker who immigrated from Russia established the Landa Carriage Works that eventually become the Landa Auto Body Works. The building is of a Pre-World War I Prairie Vernacular architectural style.

The current owners received support from the City of Saskatoon Heritage Conservation Program to restore some of the historical elements of the building.
