= Sommerville/Petitt House =

Coordinates: 52.1258°N 106.6492°W

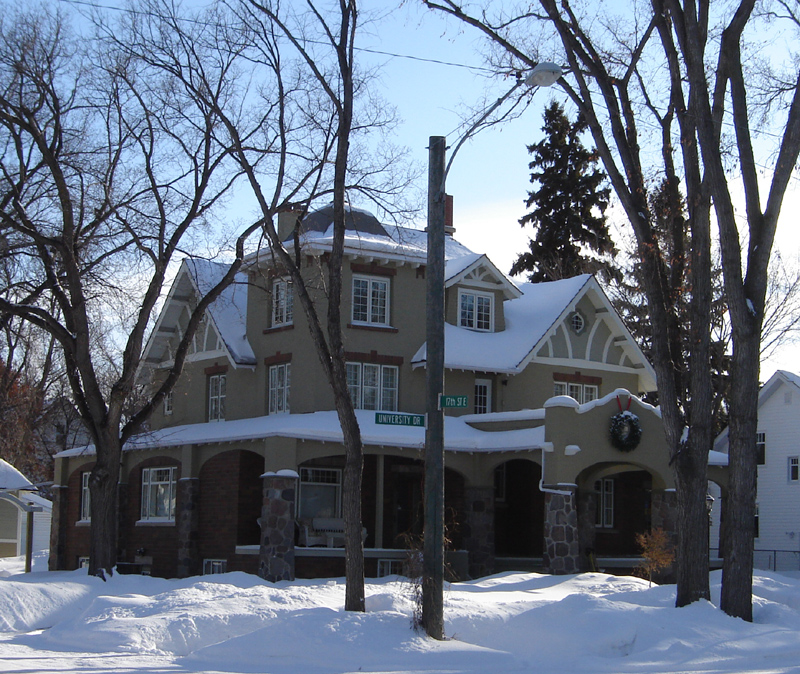
- Sommerville/Petitt House
- Interactive map of the Sommerville/Petitt House area

General information
- Location: 870 University Drive, Saskatoon, Saskatchewan, Canada
- Completed: 1912
- Client: Herman Pettit

Design and construction
- Architect: Frank P. Martin

The Sommerville/Petitt House is a municipally-designated, historic building located in the Nutana neighbourhood of Saskatoon, Saskatchewan, Canada. The property is a 2 1/2-story, stucco-and-brick house in a blended Tudor Revival and Spanish Revival style constructed in 1912. Features of the building include a tower topped with a bell-cast dome, a large arched porch with porte-cochere, and a carriage entrance supported by fieldstone pillars.
