= Jeannette Durno =

Canadian-born American pianist

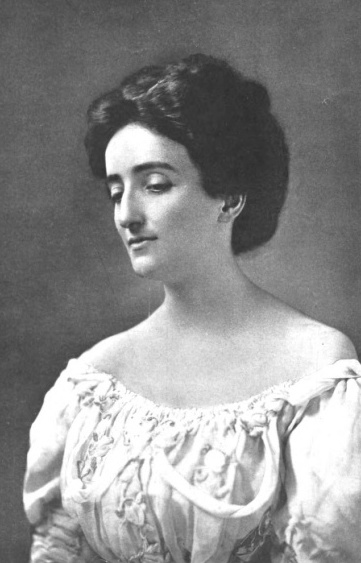
- Durno from a 1908 publication
- Born: Jeannette St. John; July 12, 1876; Walkerton, Ontario, Canada
- Died: September 5, 1963 (aged 87); Los Angeles, California, U.S.
- Other names: Jeannette Durno-Collins (during her marriage)
- Occupation: Pianist

Jeannette Durno (July 12, 1876 – September 5, 1963) was a Canadian-born American pianist.

== Early life ==
Jeannette St. John was born in Walkerton, Ontario, the daughter of William Brethour St. John and Margaret Legge St. John. She was adopted by an aunt and uncle as a little girl, and raised in Rockford, Illinois with the surname Durno. She attended Rockford College. She studied piano in Vienna, with Theodor Leschetizky; she also trained as a vocalist.

== Career ==
Jeannette Durno was a frequent guest soloist with the Chicago Symphony Orchestra. She toured in the United States and Canada, mostly in the midwest, but also appearing in New York and Boston. She played in Los Angeles at the Biennial Festival of the National Federation of Music Clubs in 1915. She made some piano rolls of her performances of works by Liszt, Debussy, Grieg, and Chopin. She was known especially for her interpretations of Chopin. "Among the younger pianists of the middle western states few more notable are to be found that Miss Jeannette Durno of Chicago," explained one publication in 1899.

She also taught piano in Chicago. Among her students were Canadian pianists Evelyn Eby, Neil Chotem, and Lyell Gustin. She also taught music pedagogy to piano teachers. Frank La Forge dedicated a 1911 composition titled "Romance" to Durno. She was active in the Musicians Club of Women.

"To me, a pianist lacking spontaneity is uninteresting," Durno told an interviewer in 1920. "Therefore it is one of my especial aims, both in my own playing and in my teaching, to preserve freshness and avoid the obviously studied effort, which is unfortunately noticeable in so much piano playing."

== Personal life ==
Jeannette Durno married her manager, Dunstan Collins, in 1901. They divorced in 1910. She was a champion amateur golfer in Chicago. She died in 1963, aged 87 years, in Los Angeles, California.
