= Marr Residence =

Historical property in Saskatoon, Saskatchewan

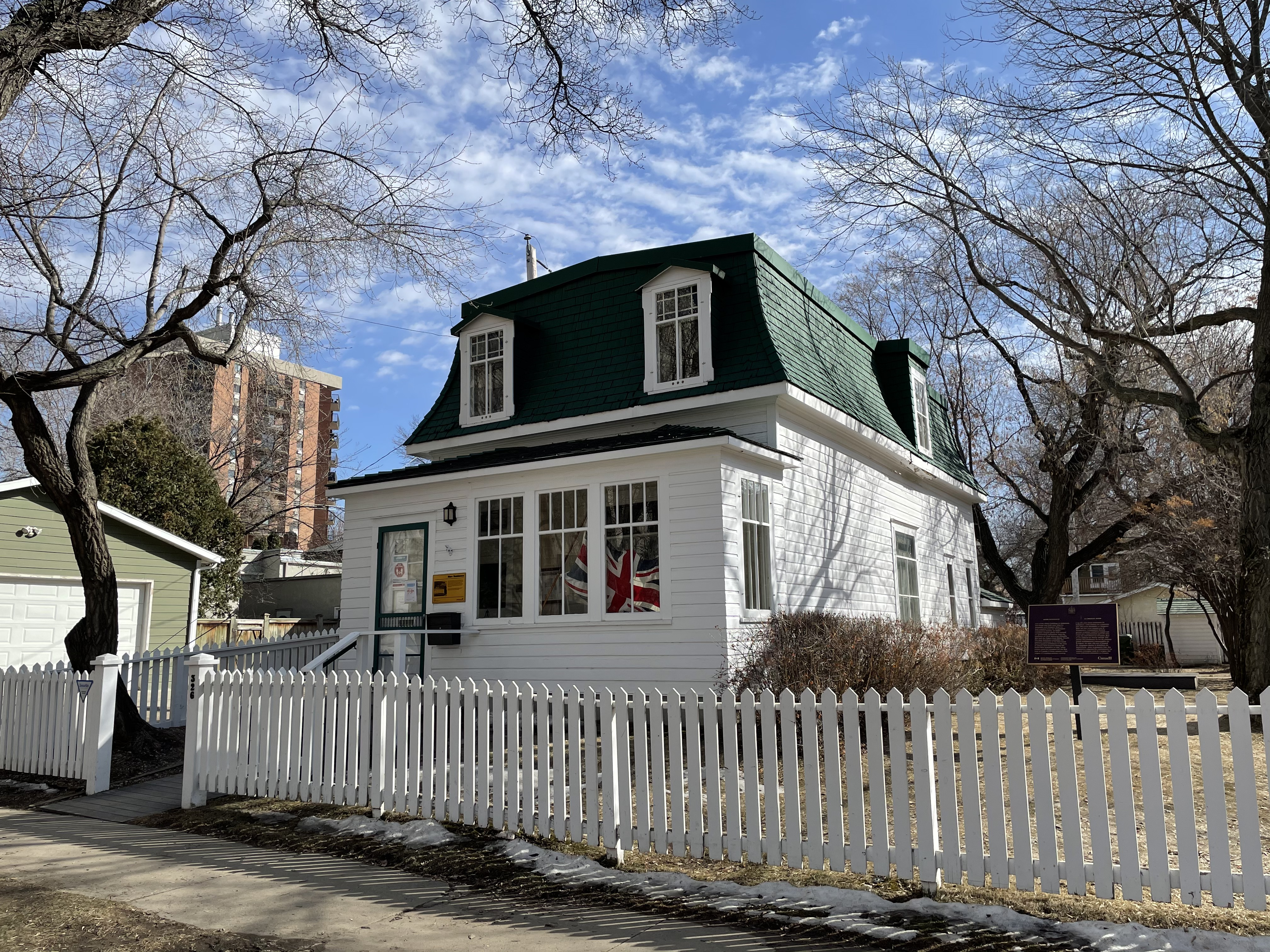
- Marr Residence
- Interactive map of the Marr Residence area

General information
- Type: (former) Private residence (current) Historic site
- Architectural style: Second Empire
- Location: Saskatoon, Saskatchewan, 326 11th Street East
- Coordinates: 52°07′07″N 106°39′48″W
- Construction started: 1884
- Completed: 1884
- Owner: City of Saskatoon

Design and construction
- Main contractor: Alexander Marr

Website
- The Marr

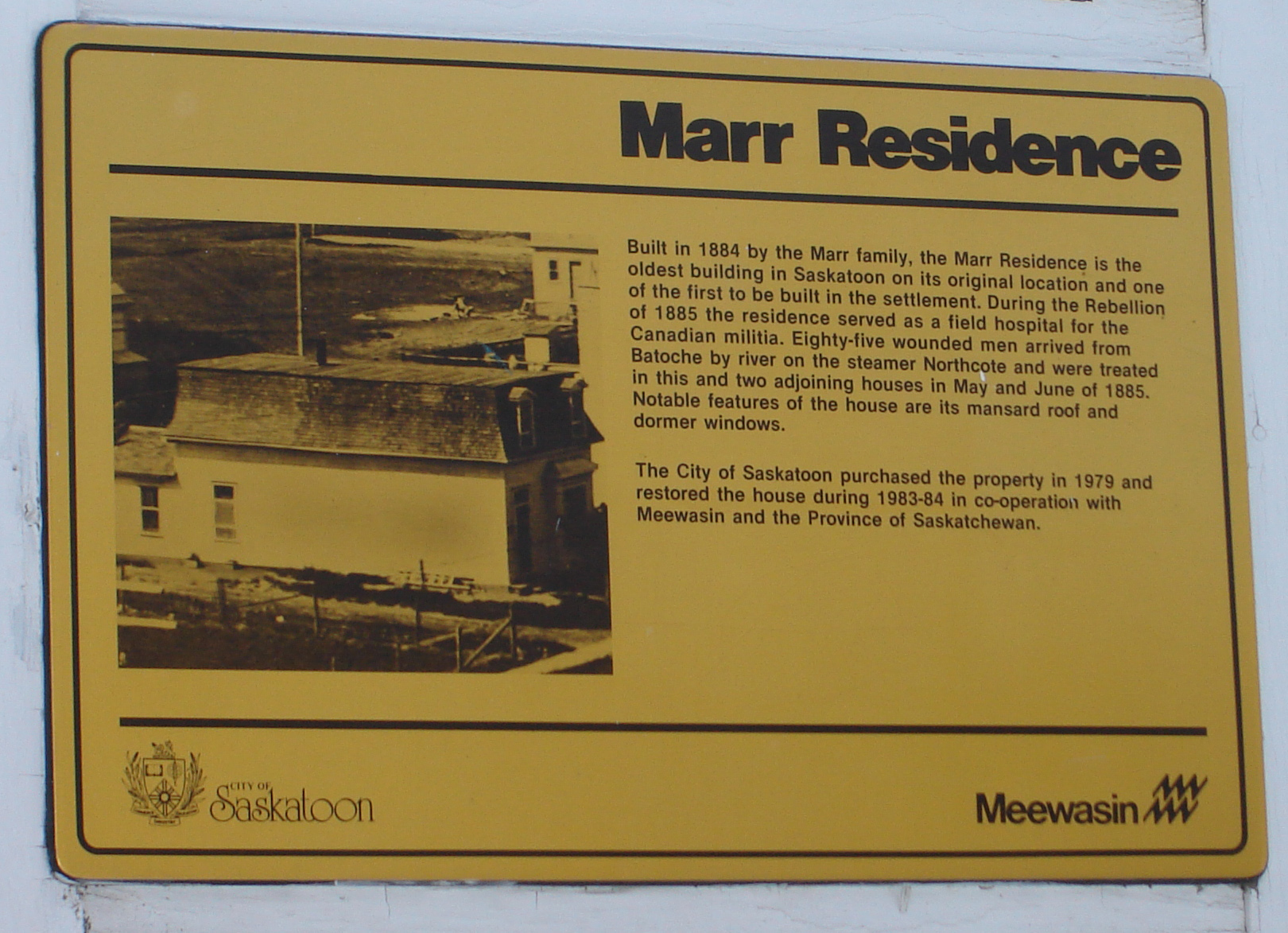
Marr House plaque

The Marr Residence is a National Historic Site located in the Nutana neighbourhood of Saskatoon, Saskatchewan, and was part of the original temperance colony that predated the city. Built in 1884 for stonemason Alexander "Sandy" Marr, it is the oldest building in Saskatoon on its original site. It was one of several houses requisitioned as a field hospital to treat wounded soldiers during the North-West Rebellion in 1885. When the hospital was closed in 1885 the home was returned to the Marr family. Although they left Saskatoon in 1889, the Marr family name remained associated with the house. The house remained a residential property until the 1970s.

The Marr Residence was designated a municipal heritage property on January 11, 1982. It is noted for its blend of Second Empire and pioneer architecture, particularly its Mansard roof. The building is currently owned by the City of Saskatoon.

On July 4, 2016, the Marr Residence was designated a National Historic Site.
