= F. P. Martin House =

Coordinates: 52°7′23″N 106°39′13″W

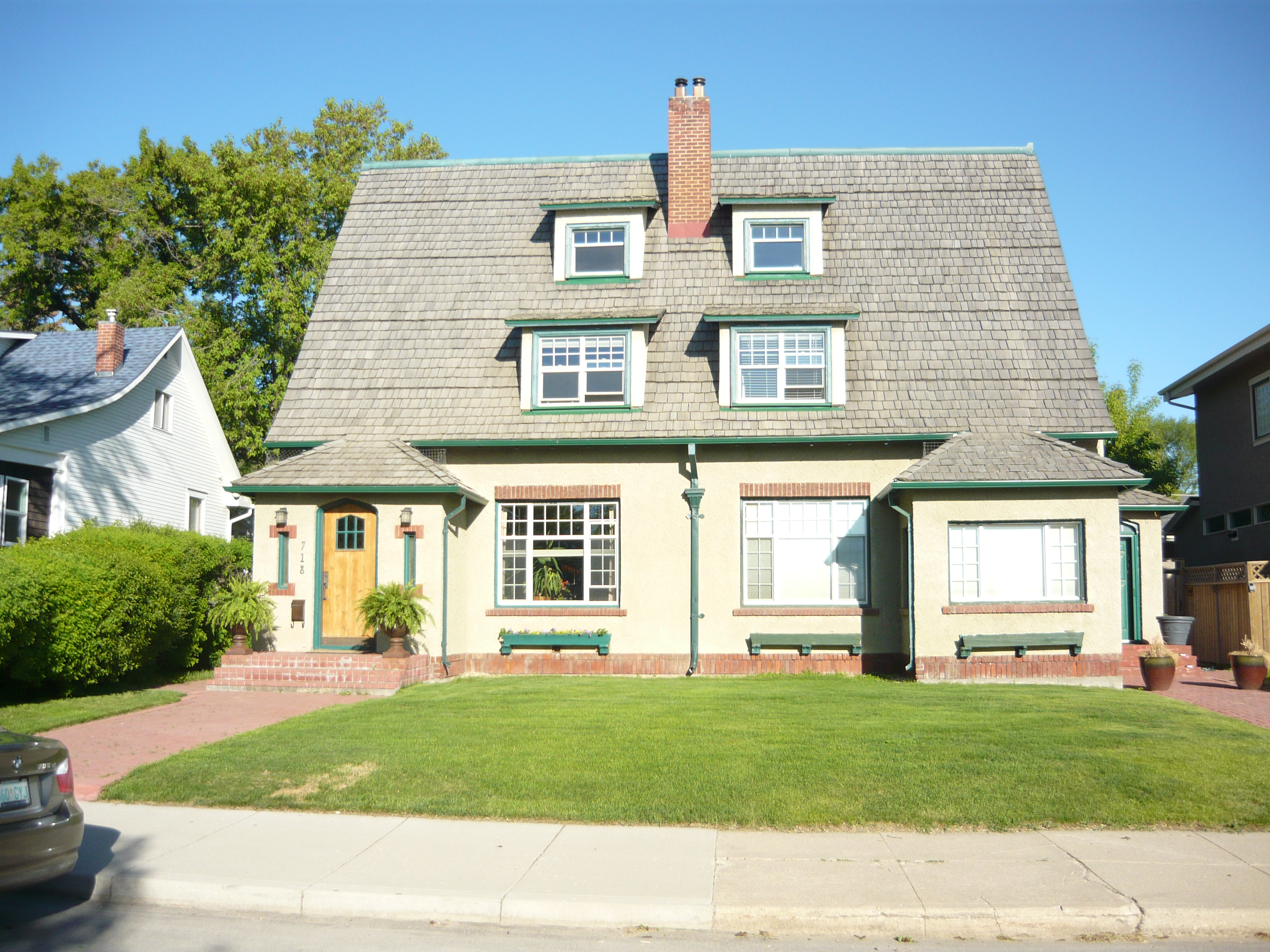
- Interactive map of the F. P. Martin House area

General information
- Architectural style: Cottage Vernacular
- Location: 718 Saskatchewan Crescent East, Saskatoon, Saskatchewan, Canada
- Construction started: 1926
- Completed: 1926

Design and construction
- Architect: Frank Percy Martin

The F. P. Martin House (built in 1926) is a designated Municipal Heritage Property located in the Nutana, neighborhood of Saskatoon, Saskatchewan, Canada. The house was built by local architect Frank Percy Martin, in a unique Cottage Style with double dormers, Gothic doorways, and lattice windows.

F. P. Martin lived in one half of the building using the third floor loft as his study, while the second half of the house was used by his brother.
