= Saskatoon Electrical System Substation =

Building in Saskatchewan, Canada

Coordinates: 52.1170°N 106.6554°W

- Interactive map of the Saskatoon Electrical System Substation area

General information
- Architectural style: Modern Classical
- Location: 619 Main Street, Saskatoon, Saskatchewan, Canada
- Construction started: 1929
- Client: Saskatoon Light & Power

The Saskatoon Electrical System Substation is a municipal designated historic building located in the Nutana neighborhood of Saskatoon, Saskatchewan, Canada. The property contains a two-story building in a Modern Classical style, made of No. 2 Redcliff, Light Claybank and Tee Pee Mocha brick construction. The building was constructed in 1929 by Saskatoon Light & Power along with two other such stations to meet the growing electrical demand of the city.It was declared a heritage site on December 4, 2000; and renovated into offices in the 1990s.The building now houses the offices of the architectural firm of Kindrachuk Agrey Architects.
