= Briarwood, Saskatoon =

Briarwood
- Neighbourhood
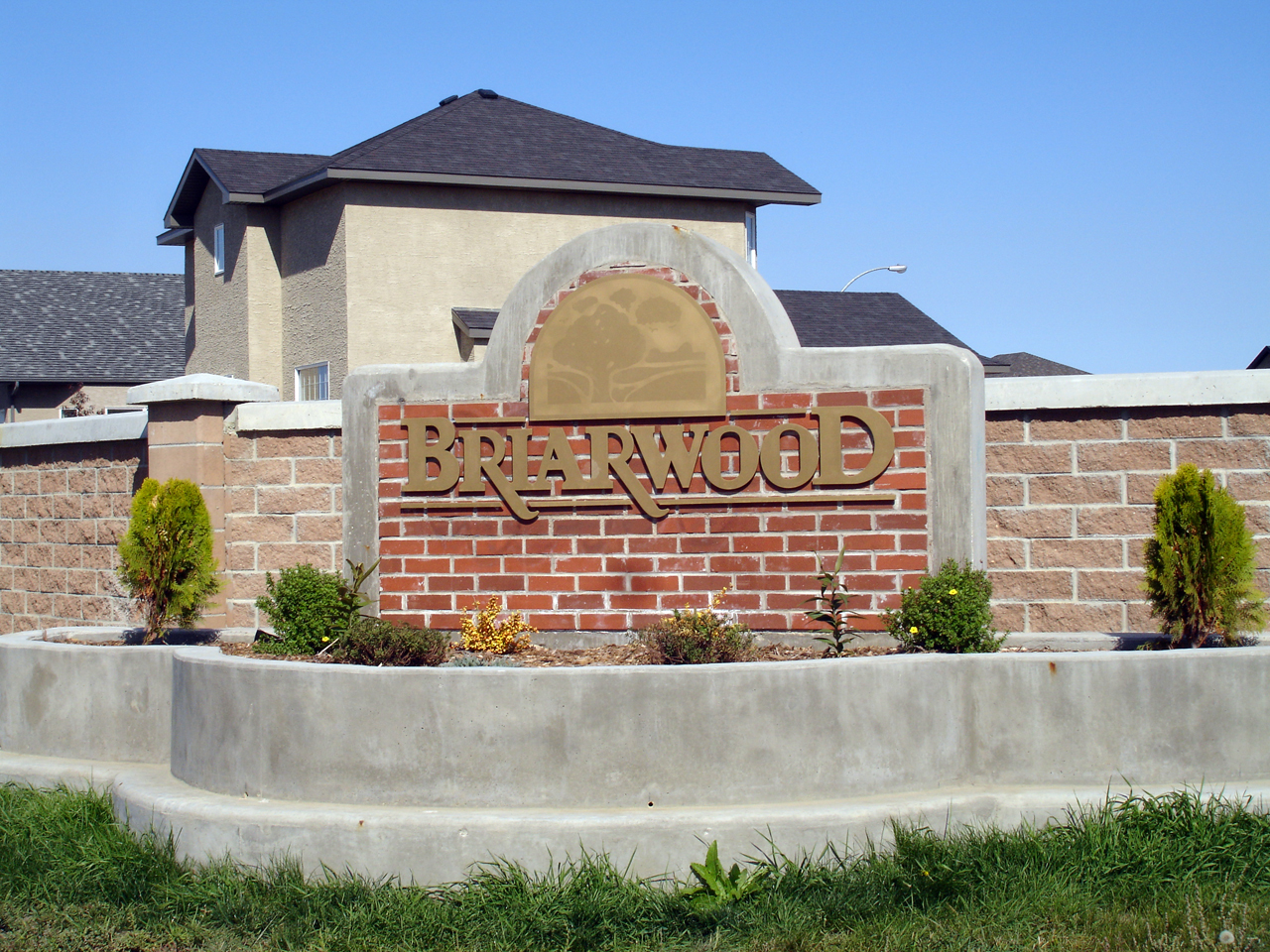
- Briarwood entrance sign

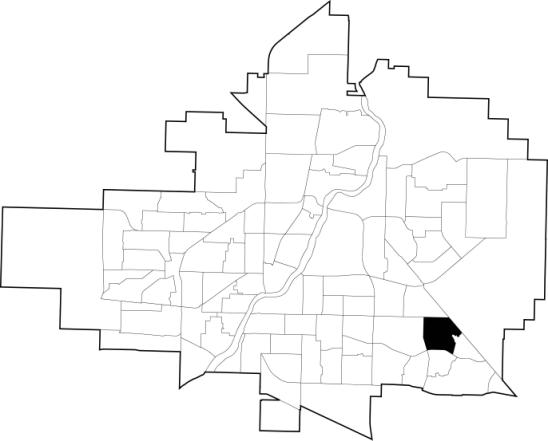
- Briarwood location map
- Coordinates: 52°6′31″N 106°33′48″W
- Country: Canada
- Province: Saskatchewan
- City: Saskatoon
- Suburban Development Area: Lakewood
- Neighbourhood: Briarwood
- Annexed: 1975-1979
- Construction: 1988-2010

Government
  - Type: Municipal (Ward 8)
  - Administrative body: Saskatoon City Council
  - Councillor: Sarina Gersher

Area
  - Total: 1.7 km^{2} (0.66 sq mi)

Population (2009)
  - Total: 4,473
  - Average Income: $105,651
- Time zone: UTC-6 (UTC)
- Website: Briarwood Community Association

Briarwood is a residential neighbourhood located in the southeast part of Saskatoon, Saskatchewan, Canada. The majority of its residents live in low-density, single detached dwellings. As of 2009, the area is home to 4,473 residents. The neighbourhood is considered a very high-income area, with an average family income of $117,619, an average dwelling value of $449,158 and a home ownership rate of 97.0%.

== History ==
The land where Briarwood now exists was originally farmland, owned by Mike Boychuk. He would become the owner of Boychuk Construction, a major Saskatoon homebuilder founded in 1945. Boychuk Drive, which forms Briarwood's western boundary, bears his name. The land was annexed by the city in the period between 1975 and 1979. Home construction began in 1988, but reached its peak between 1996 and 2001.

Unlike most Saskatoon neighbourhoods, which name streets to honour noteworthy individuals or places, Briarwood's streets all begin with the letter "B". This makes Briarwood and the neighbourhood of Eastview somewhat unusual with their more generic street naming conventions. One exception is Wess Road; running down the eastern side of Briarwood, it is a remnant of an earlier highway alignment (prior to the development of Circle Drive) that, despite having businesses located on it and acting as an alternate route connecting to Highway 16 (prior to being truncated by residential development in Rosewood), was never given an official street name until the late 2010s.

== Institutions ==
=== Education ===
The Saskatoon Public School Division and Greater Saskatoon Catholic School Division opted not to build schools in Briarwood, much to the resentment of some residents, who purchased homes assuming that schools would be built. A conflict ensued between homeowners and the land developers who wished to have the land rezoned for houses.

Students who live in the area are bused to either Wildwood or Lakeridge schools if they are enrolled in the Saskatoon Public School Division and to either Bishop Pocock or St. Luke schools if they are enrolled in the Greater Saskatoon Catholic School Division.

== Government and politics ==
Briarwood exists within the federal electoral district of Saskatoon—Grasswood. It is currently represented by Kevin Waugh of the Conservative Party of Canada, first elected in 2015.

Provincially, the area is divided into three constituencies: Saskatoon Southeast, Saskatoon Stonebridge-Dakota and Saskatoon Willowgrove. Saskatoon Southeast is currently represented by Don Morgan of the Saskatchewan Party since 2003. Saskatoon Stonebridge-Dakota is currently represented by Bronwyn Eyre of the Saskatchewan Party since 2016. Saskatoon Willowgrove is currently represented by Ken Cheveldayoff of the Saskatchewan Party since 2003.

In Saskatoon's non-partisan municipal politics, Briarwood lies within ward 8. It is currently represented by Councillor Sarina Gersher, who was first elected in 2016.

== Parks and recreation ==
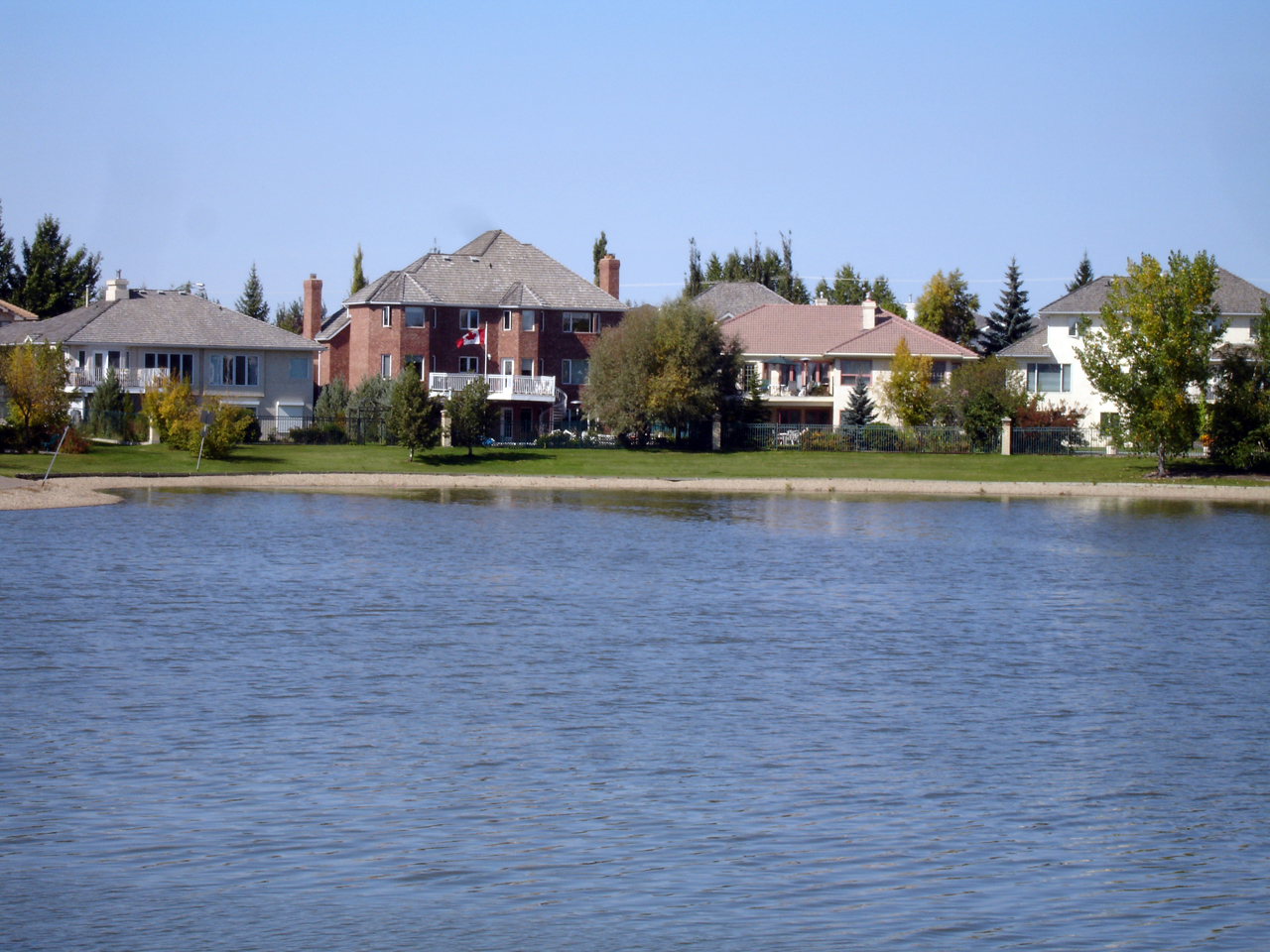
Homes around Briarwood Lake

- Briarwood Linear Park - 2.2 acres
- Briarwood Swale - 14.3 acres
- Briarwood Lake Park - 16.1 acres
- Briarwood Neighbourhood Park - 17.4 acres

The Briarwood Community Association represents local interests in discussions with the city on quality of life issues. To promote a sense of community, volunteers organize various events throughout the year, operate programs out of the Briarwood Recreation Centre and maintain the outdoor rink on Briarwood Pond.

== Public services ==
Briarwood is a part of the east division of the Saskatoon Police Services patrol system. Saskatoon Fire & Protective Services' east division covers the neighbourhood. Transit services to Briarwood are provided by Saskatoon Transit on route No. 84 (Briarwood).

== Commercial ==
At present, no parts of Briarwood have commercial development. 94 home-based businesses exist in the area. The nearest commercial areas lies to the south in the Lakewood Suburban Centre and to the northwest along 8th Street including The Centre at Circle and 8th shopping centre; future development to the east is expected to include a new commercial hub along an extension of 8th Street, not far from Briarwood.

== Location ==
Briarwood is located within the Lakewood Suburban Development Area. It is bounded by 8th Street to the north, Boychuk Drive to the west, Taylor Street to the south, and Wess Road to the east. Inside those boundaries, the roads are a mix of local and collector roads.
