= Lakeridge, Saskatoon =

Lakeridge
- City of Saskatoon neighbourhood
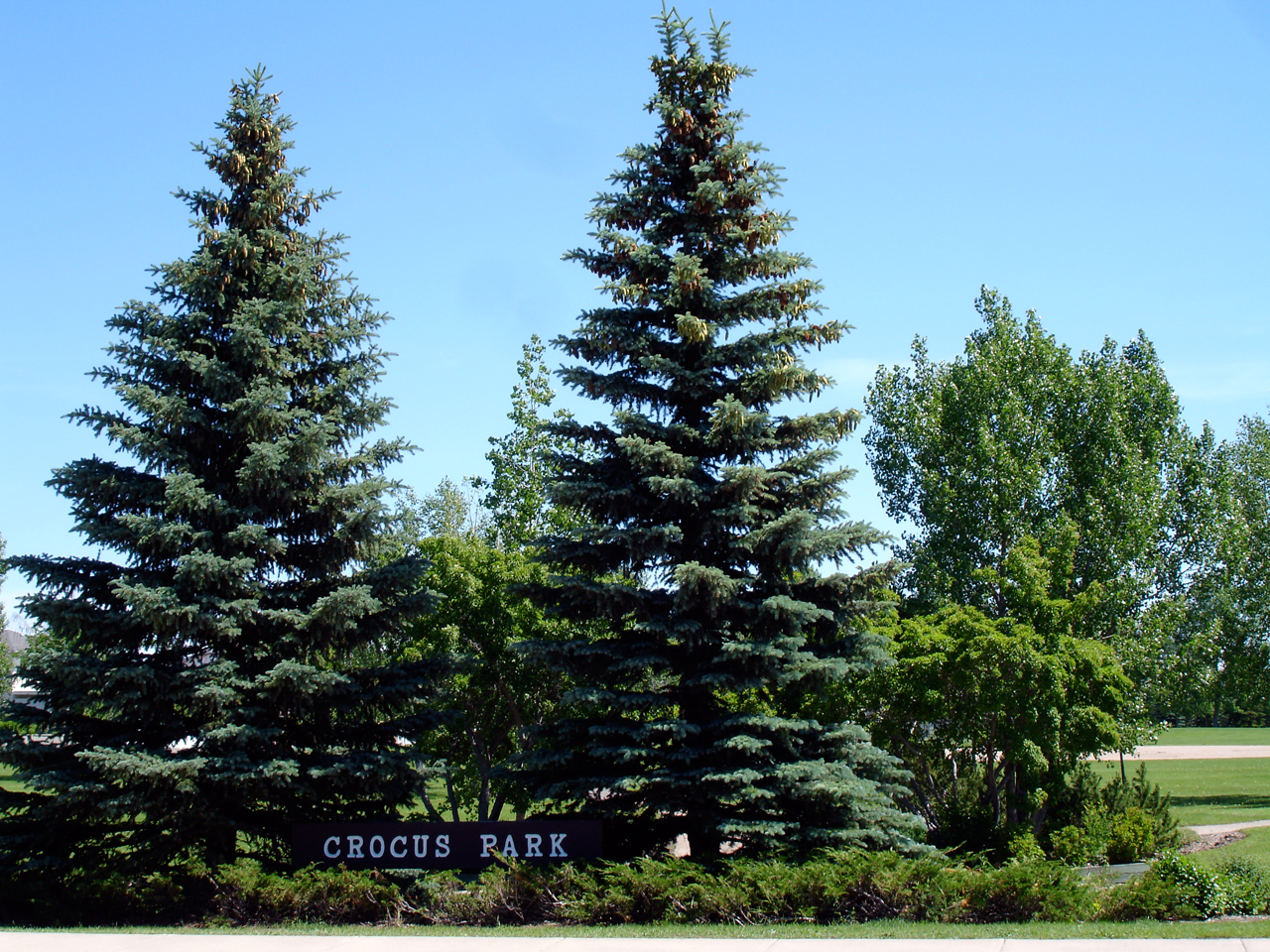
- Crocus Park

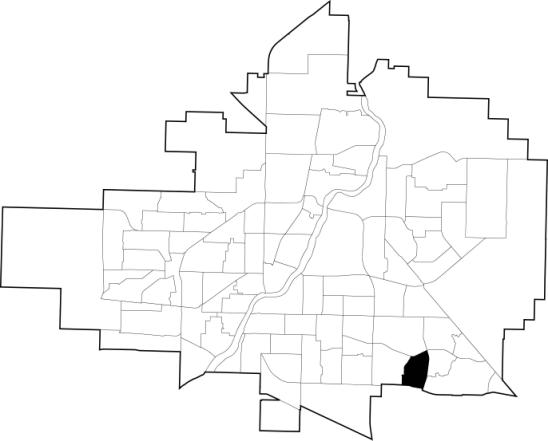
- Lakeridge location map
- Coordinates: 52°5′42″N 106°34′40″W
- Country: Canada
- Province: Saskatchewan
- City: Saskatoon
- Suburban Development Area: Lakewood
- Neighbourhood: Lakeridge
- Annexed: 1975-1979
- Construction: 1982-1995

Government
  - Type: Municipal (Ward 9)
  - Administrative body: Saskatoon City Council
  - Councillor: Bev Dubois

Area
  - Total: 1.2 km^{2} (0.46 sq mi)

Population (2011)
  - Total: 4,051
  - Average Income: $127,698
- Time zone: UTC−06:00 (UTC)
- Website: www.lakeridgecommunity.ca

Lakeridge is a residential neighbourhood located in the southeast part of Saskatoon, Saskatchewan, Canada. Almost all of its residents live in low-density, single detached houses. As of 2009, the area is home to 4,051 residents. The neighbourhood is considered an upper-income area, with an average family income of $127,698, an average dwelling value of $357,024 and a home ownership rate of 98.8%.

== History ==
The land where Lakeridge now exists was annexed in the period between 1975 and 1979. Home construction was at its peak from 1981 until 1985 and the area was originally branded as part of neighbouring Lakeview before being given a separate designation in the mid-1980s. The streets in Lakeridge are named after Saskatchewan lakes.

== Government and politics ==
Lakeridge exists within the federal electoral district of Saskatoon—Grasswood. It is currently represented by Kevin Waugh of the Conservative Party of Canada, first elected in 2015.

Provincially, the area is within the constituency of Saskatoon Southeast. It is currently represented by Brittney Senger of the New Democratic Party, first elected in 2024.

In Saskatoon's non-partisan municipal politics, Lakeridge lies within ward 9. It is currently represented by Councillor Bev Dubois, first elected in 2016.

== Institutions ==
=== Education ===
Lakeridge School
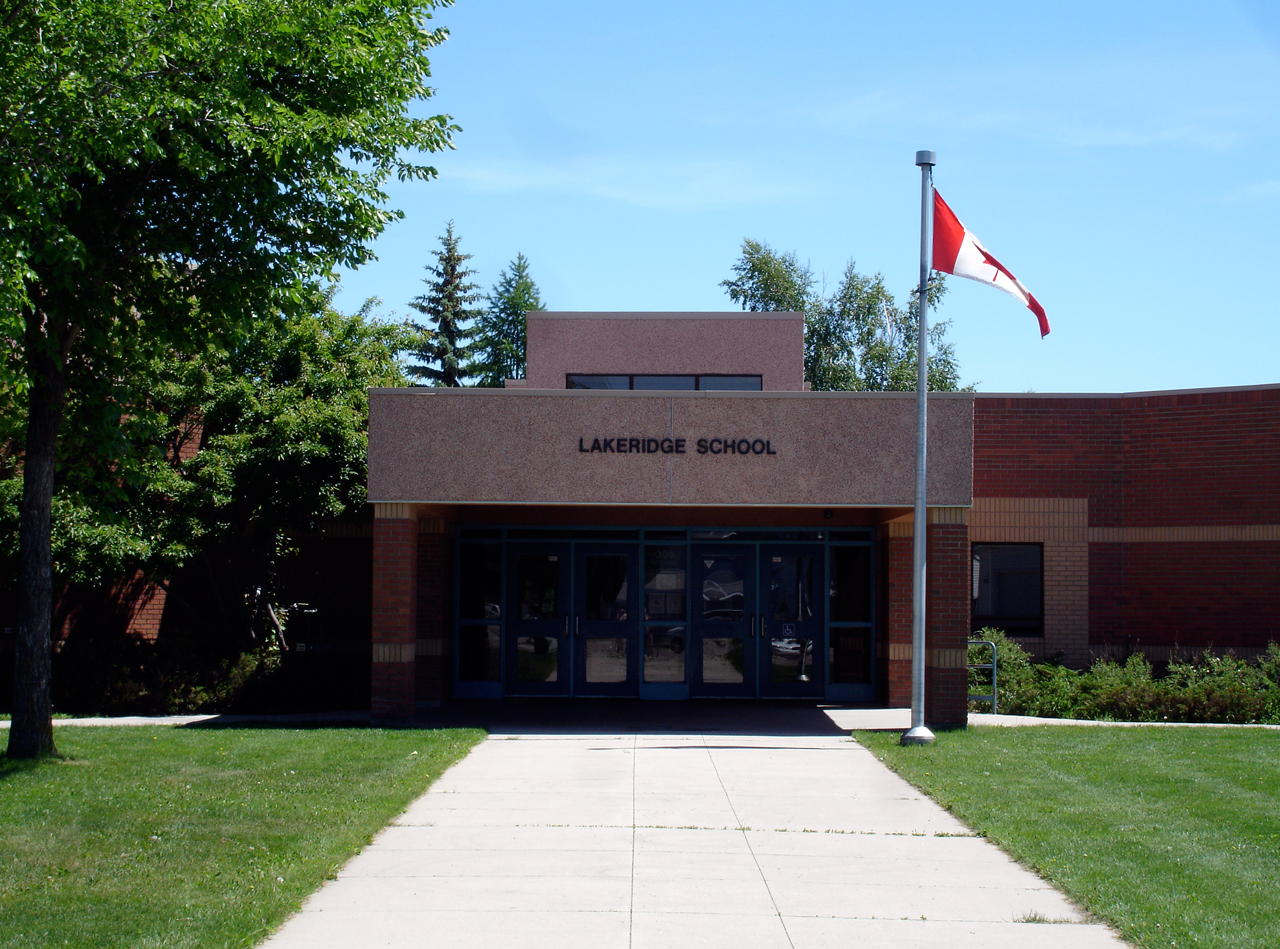

Location
- 305 Waterbury Road; Saskatoon, Saskatchewan, S7J 4Z7; Canada

Information
- Type: Elementary
- Opened: 1989
- School board: Saskatoon Public School Division
- Principal: Janna Leel
- Grades: Kindergarten to Grade 8
- Enrollment: 430 (2017)
- Education system: Public
- Language: English
- Feeder to: Walter Murray Collegiate
- Website: Lakeridge School

St. Luke School
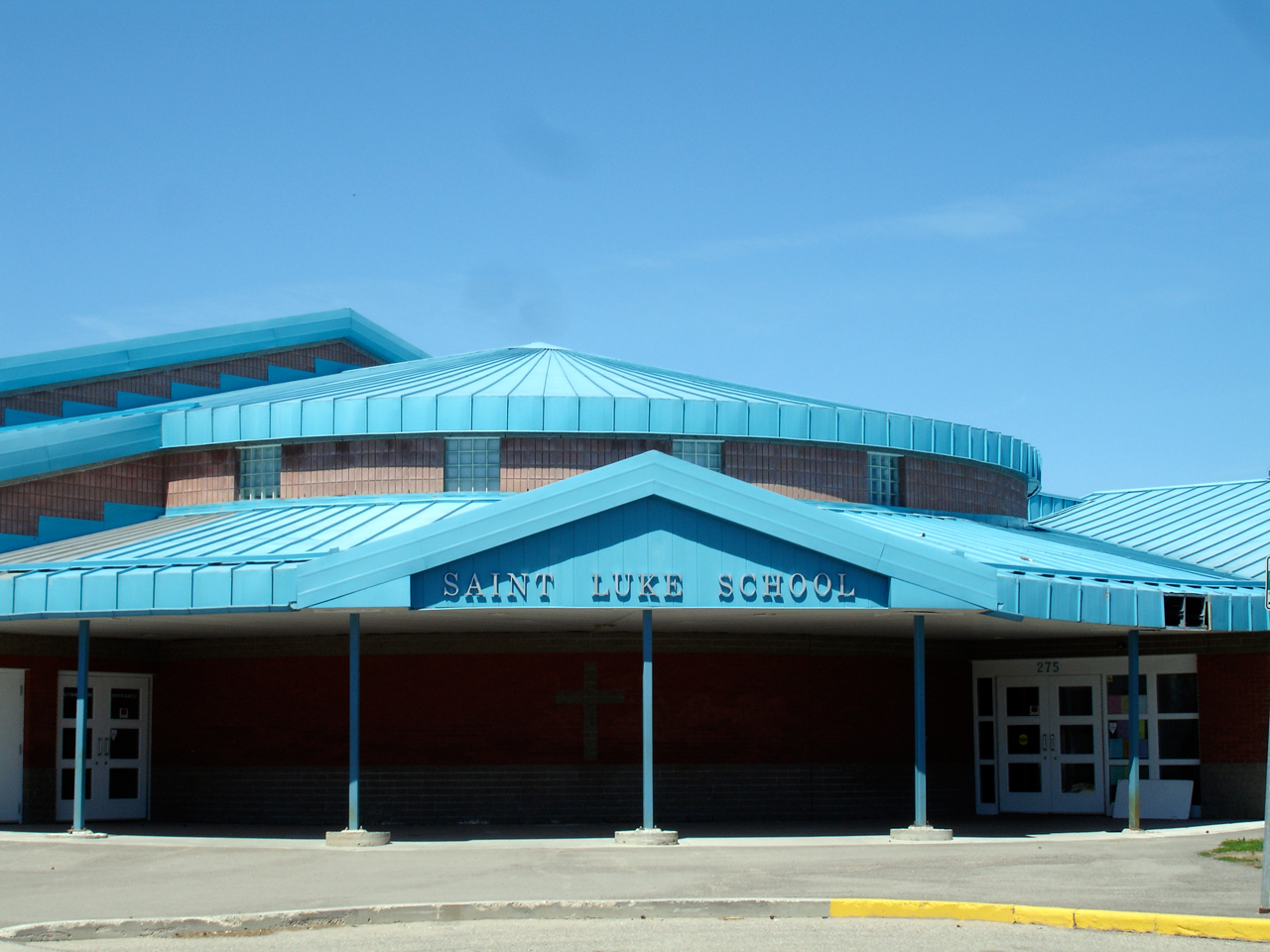

Location
- 275 Emmeline Road; Saskatoon, Saskatchewan, S7J 5B7; Canada

Information
- Type: Elementary
- Religious affiliation: Catholic
- Opened: 1989
- School board: Greater Saskatoon Catholic Schools
- Principal: Darren Hyshka
- Grades: Kindergarten to Grade 8
- Enrollment: 291 (2017)
- Education system: Separate
- Language: English
- Feeder to: Holy Cross High School
- Website: St. Luke School

- Lakeridge School - public elementary, part of the Saskatoon Public School Division
- St. Luke School - separate (Catholic) elementary, part of Greater Saskatoon Catholic Schools

== Parks and recreation ==
- Crocus Park - 18.2 acres (7.4 ha)

The Lakeridge Community Association organizes social activities, maintains the outdoor rink and playground in Crocus Park, and delivers a variety of leisure and sports programs for adults, children/youth, and preschoolers. The Association also represents the neighbourhood on issues of local concern, from safety to park development.

== Commercial ==
There are no commercial areas in Lakeridge. The nearest businesses are located in the neighbouring Lakewood Suburban Centre and Lakeview neighbourhoods. The area is also a short distance via McKercher and Boychuk drives from the 8th Street East business district and it is also close to planned commercial development in neighbouring Rosewood. There are 72 home-based business registered in the neighbourhood.

== Location ==
Lakeridge is located within the Lakewood Suburban Development Area. It is bounded by Taylor Street to the north, Weyakwin Drive to the west, Highway 16 to the south, and Boychuk Drive to the east. Inside those boundaries, the roads are a mix of local roads and collector roads. Several maps published in the 2000s show a proposed interchange at the junction of Boychuk Drive and Highway 16, which was completed in 2018.
