= College Park East, Saskatoon =

College Park East
- Neighbourhood
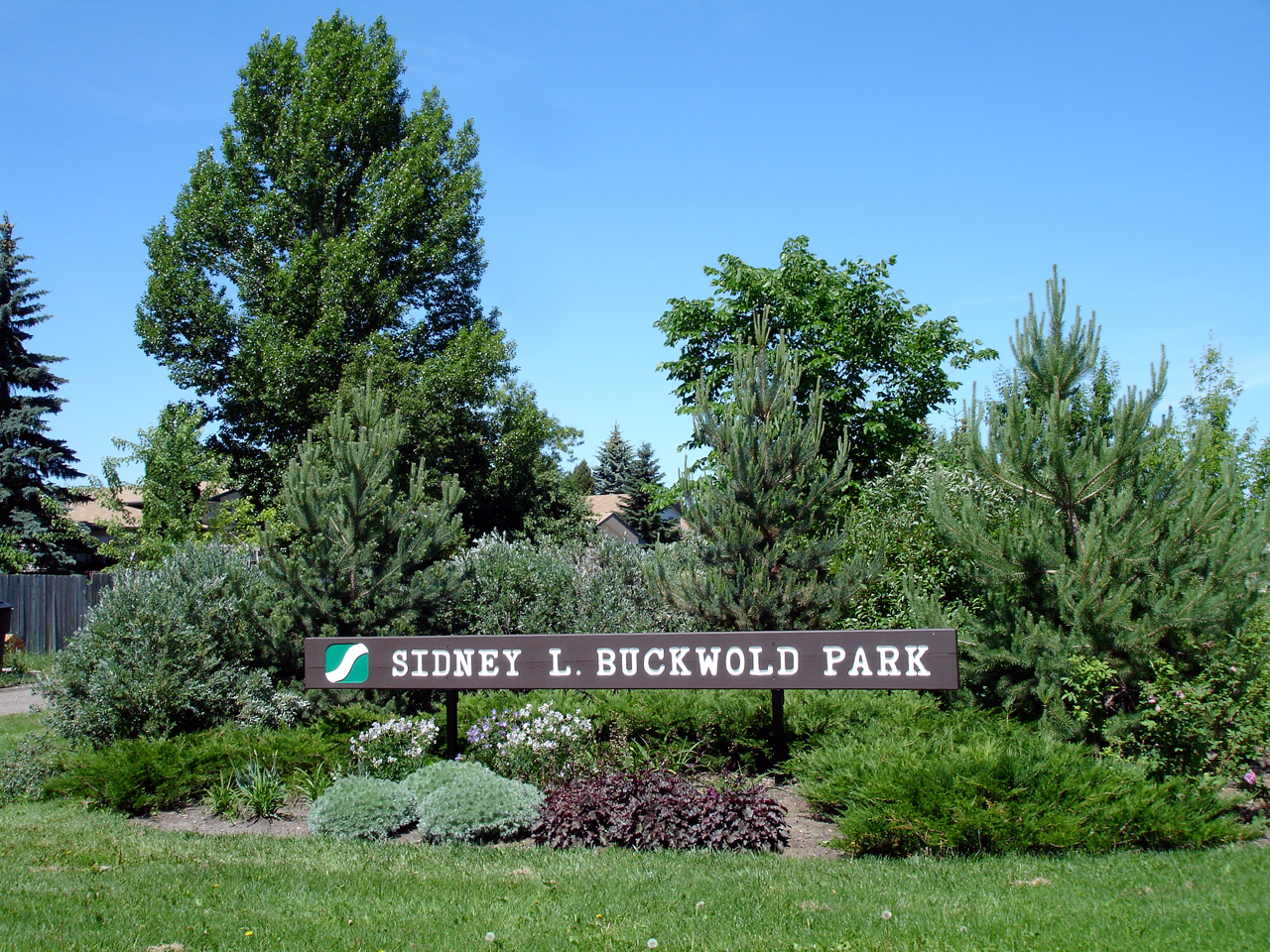
- Sidney L. Buckwold Park

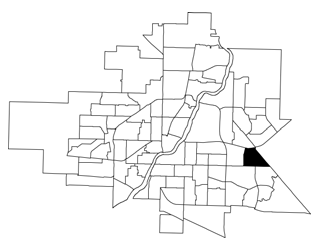
- College Park East location map
- Coordinates: 52°7′13″N 106°34′30″W
- Country: Canada
- Province: Saskatchewan
- City: Saskatoon
- Suburban Development Area: Lakewood
- Neighbourhood: College Park East
- Annexed: 1970-1974
- Construction: 1971-1980

Government
  - Type: Municipal (Ward 8)
  - Administrative body: Saskatoon City Council
  - Councillor: Scott Ford

Area
  - Total: 1.61 km^{2} (0.62 sq mi)

Population (2021)
  - Total: 4,747
- Time zone: UTC-7 (MST)
  - Summer (DST): UTC-6 (CST)
- Website: East College Park Community Association

College Park East is a primarily residential neighbourhood located in the east-central part of Saskatoon, Saskatchewan, Canada. The majority of its residents live in single-family detached dwellings, with a sizeable minority of high-density, multiple-unit dwellings. As of 2021, the area is home to 4,747 residents with an average household size of 2.5 people. The neighbourhood is considered a middle-income area, with a median personal income of $40,340, a home ownership rate of 77.0%, and an average single family dwelling value of $324,875.

== History ==
The land where College Park East now exists was annexed in the period between 1970 and 1974. Home construction was at its peak from 1971 until 1980. Streets are named after Canadian universities and professors, which continues the theme from the College Park neighbourhood. The community is also widely known by the variant name East College Park.

== Government and politics ==
College Park East exists within the federal electoral district of Saskatoon—Grasswood. It is currently represented by Kevin Waugh of the Conservative Party of Canada, first elected in 2015.

Provincially, the area is divided by Boychuk Drive into the constituencies of Saskatoon University and Saskatoon Willowgrove. Saskatoon University is currently represented by Tajinder Grewal of the Saskatchewan New Democratic Party, first elected in 2024. Saskatoon Willowgrove is currently represented by Ken Cheveldayoff of the Saskatchewan Party, first elected in 2003.

In Saskatoon's non-partisan municipal politics, College Park East lies within Ward 8. It is currently represented by Councillor Scott Ford, first elected in 2024.

== Institutions ==
=== Education ===
Roland Michener School
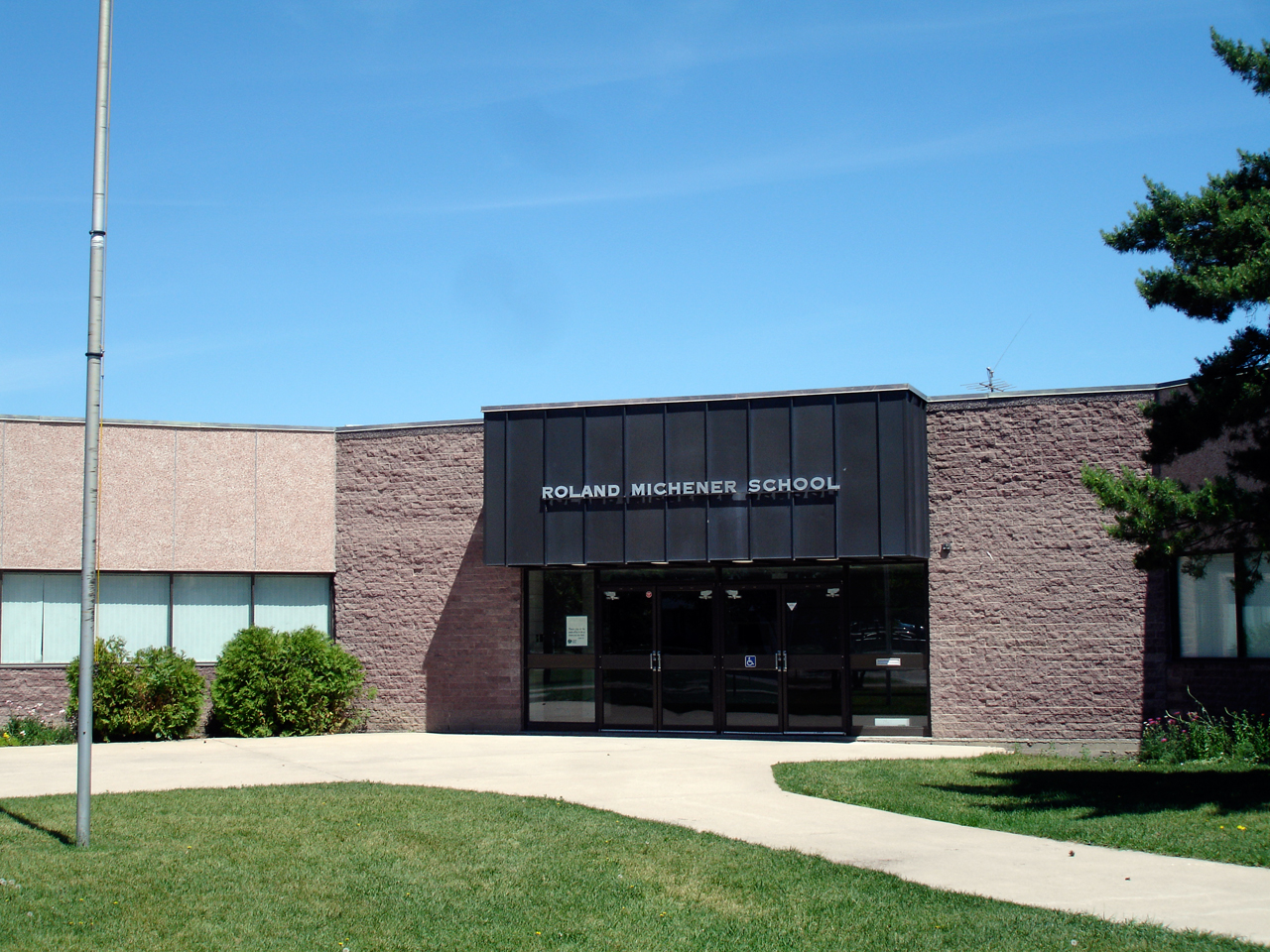

Location
- 4215 DeGeer Street; Saskatoon, Saskatchewan, S7H 4N6; Canada

Information
- Type: Elementary
- Established: 1975
- School board: Saskatoon Public School Division
- Principal: Jamie Prokopchuk
- Grades: Kindergarten to Grade 8
- Enrollment: 400 (2025)
- Education system: Public
- Language: English
- Feeder to: Evan Hardy Collegiate
- Website: Roland Michener School

St. Augustine School
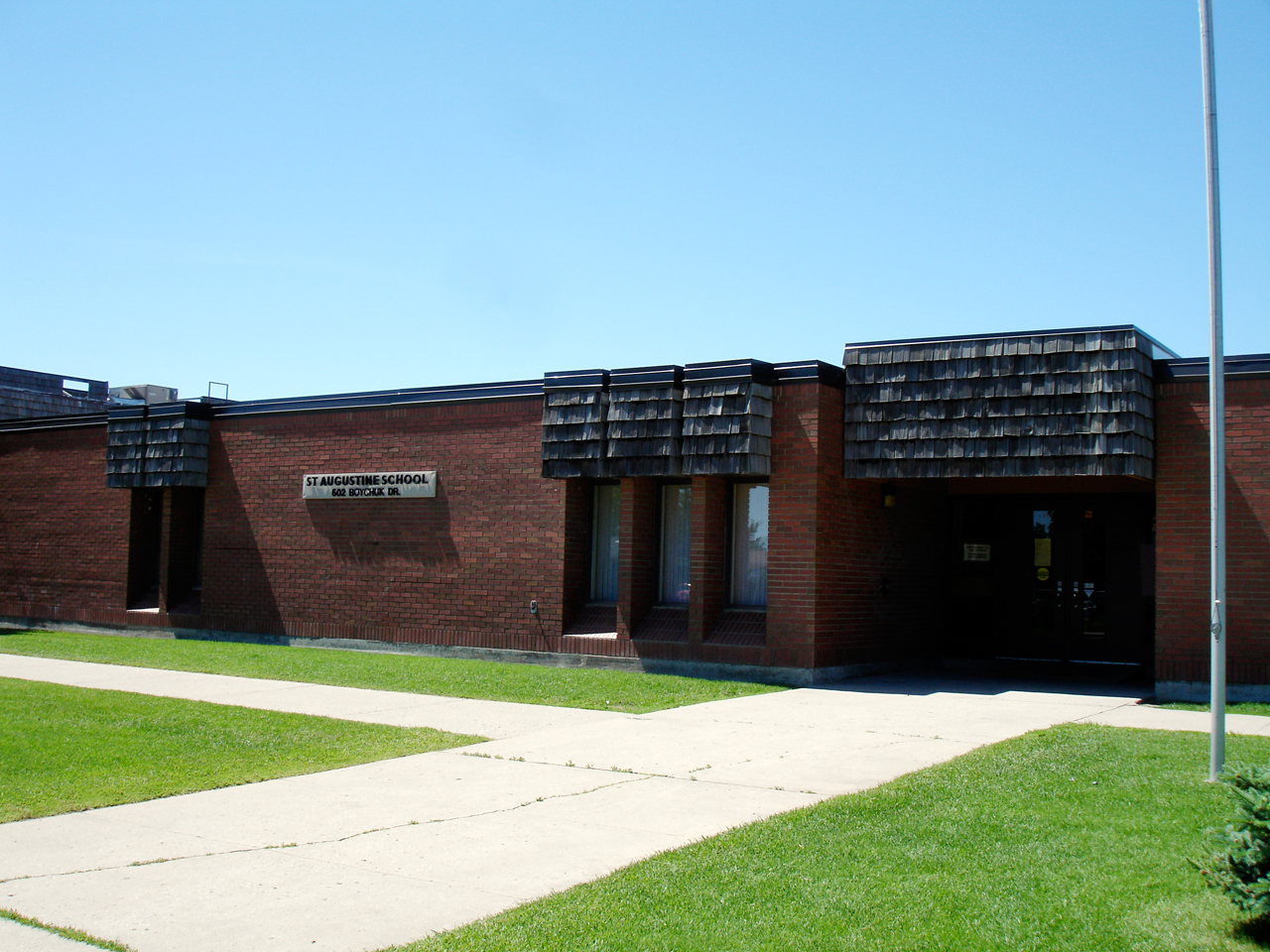

Location
- 602 Boychuk Drive; Saskatoon, Saskatchewan, S7H 4S1; Canada

Information
- Type: Elementary
- Religious affiliation: Catholic
- Opened: 1975
- School board: Greater Saskatoon Catholic Schools
- Principal: Jackie Doepker
- Grades: Kindergarten to Grade 8
- Enrollment: 208 (2015)
- Education system: Separate
- Language: English
- Feeder to: St. Joseph High School
- Website: St. Augustine School

- Roland Michener School - public elementary, part of the Saskatoon Public School Division.
- St. Augustine School - separate (Catholic) elementary, part of Greater Saskatoon Catholic Schools

== Parks and recreation ==
- Sidney L. Buckwold Park, district section - 6.9 acres (2.8 ha)
- Edward McCourt Park - 14.8 acres (6.0 ha)
- Sidney L. Buckwold Park, neighbourhood section - 26.2 acres (10.6 ha)

The East College Park Community Association provides neighbourhood residents with access to a broad range of quality sports, recreational, and leisure programs. The association operates a variety of programs out of Roland Michener and St. Augustine schools. Volunteers also organize fundraisers, stage community events, maintain and operate the community rink, put together a newsletter and work with the City on local concerns such as park development.

== Commercial ==
Commercial development includes a strip mall on Boychuk Drive & Laurentian Drive, and a convenience store and car wash on 8th Street & McKercher Drive. There is also a strip-mall development on 8th Street just to the west of the community boundary. As of 2020, there were 97 licensed home-based businesses in the area.

All other property in the neighbourhood is zoned as residential.

== Location ==
College Park East is located within the Lakewood Suburban Development Area. It is bounded by 8th Street to the south, the CP Railway tracks to the east, College Drive to the north, and McKercher Drive to the west. Inside those boundaries, the roads are a mix of local roads and collector roads.
