= Lakewood Sector =

- Sector
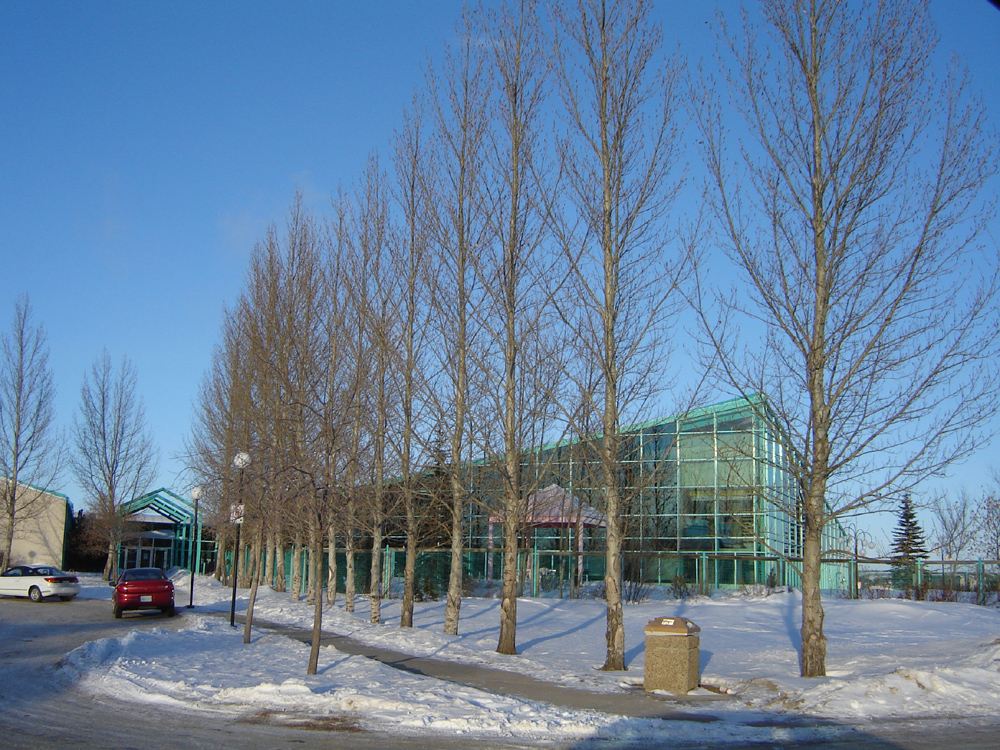
- Lakewood Civic Centre
- Interactive map of Lakewood Sector
- Coordinates: 52°6′32″N 106°34′48″W
- Country: Canada
- Province: Saskatchewan
- City: Saskatoon

Population (2021)
  - Total: 51,237
- Area code: Area code 306

Lakewood Sector, previously known as Lakewood Suburban Development Area (SDA), is a sector in Saskatoon, Saskatchewan, Canada. It is a part of the east side community of Saskatoon. It lies (generally) north and west of the outskirts of the City and the Rural Municipality of Corman Park No. 344, south of the University Heights Sector, and east of the Nutana Sector.

== Neighbourhoods ==
- Briarwood
- College Park
- College Park East
- Lakeridge
- Lakewood Urban Centre
- Lakeview
- Rosewood
- Wildwood

== Recreation facilities ==
- City of Saskatoon Lakewood Civic Center
- Lakewood Park

== Shopping ==
- The Centre At Circle & Eighth
- College Park Mall
- Market Mall

== Education ==
Lakewood Sector is home to the following schools:

=== Separate (Catholic) education ===
==== Elementary schools ====
- Bishop Pocock School
- Cardinal Leger School
- St. Augustine School
- St. Bernard School
- St. Luke School

=== Public education ===
==== Secondary schools ====
- Evan Hardy Collegiate

==== Elementary schools ====
- College Park School
- Lakeview School
- Lakeridge School
- Roland Michener School
- Wildwood School

== Library ==
- Saskatoon Public Library Cliff Wright Branch

== Transportation ==
=== City transit ===
The following routes serve the area, all meeting at the bus terminal at The Centre Mall.

- Route 1 – Wildwood/Westview
- Route 2 – 8th Street/Meadowgreen
- Route 3 – College Park/Riversdale
- Route 5 – Briarwood/Fairhaven
- Route 50 – Lakeview/Pacific Heights (DART)
- Route 60 – Lakeridge/Confederation Park (DART)
