= Lakeview, Saskatoon =

Lakeview
- City of Saskatoon neighbourhood
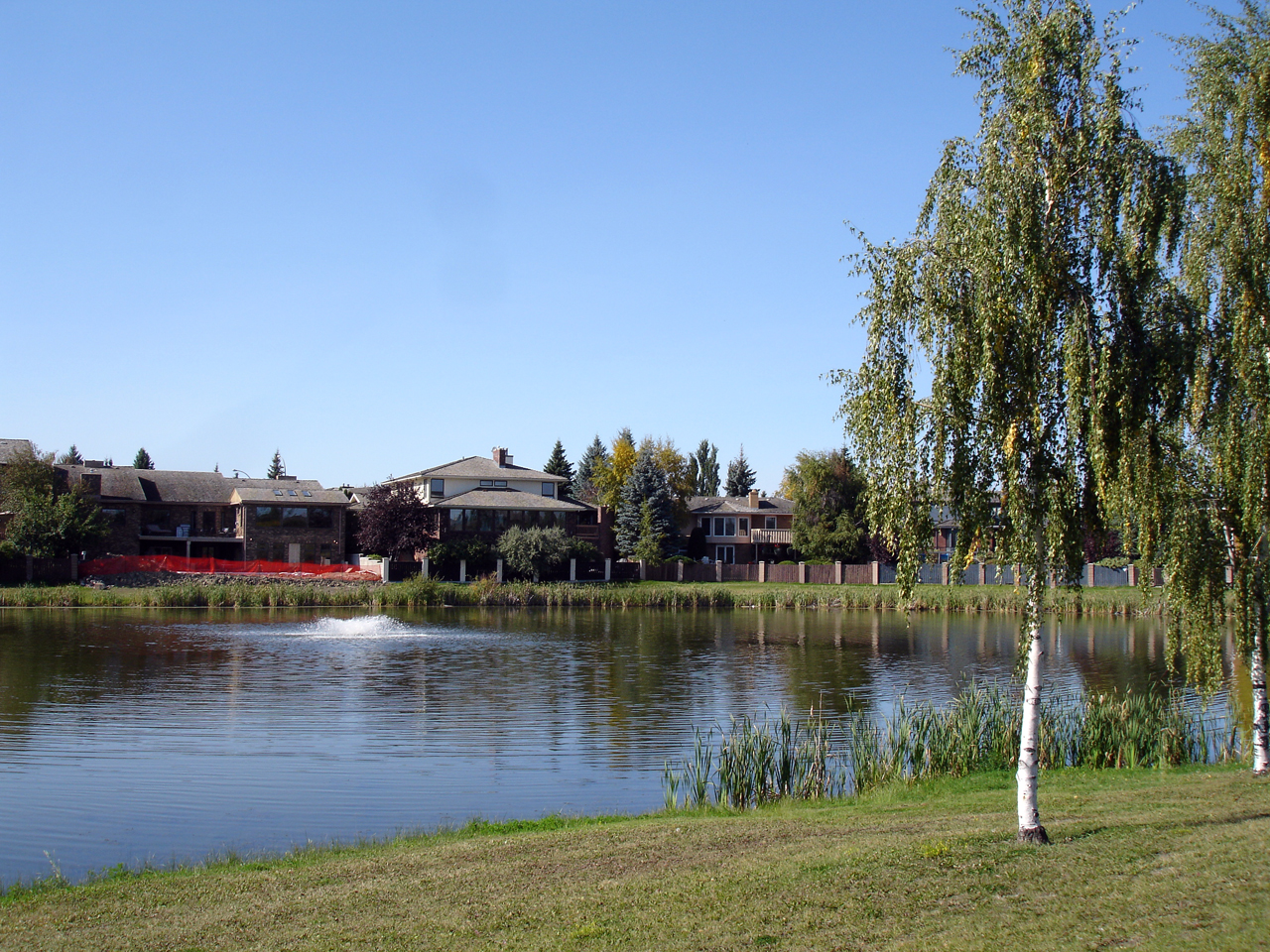
- Lakeview Park

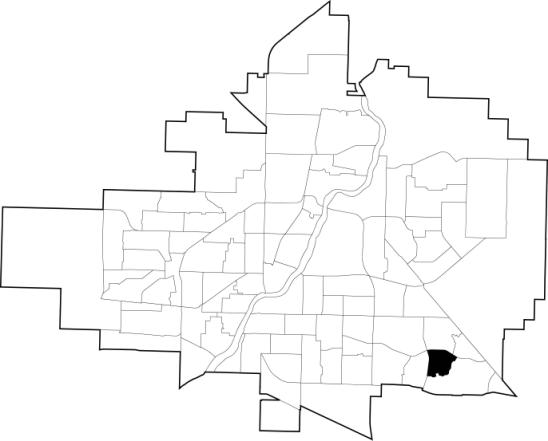
- Lakeview location map
- Coordinates: 52°5′49″N 106°35′40″W
- Country: Canada
- Province: Saskatchewan
- City: Saskatoon
- Suburban Development Area: Lakewood
- Neighbourhood: Lakeview
- Annexed: 1975–1979
- Construction: 1980–1990

Government
  - Type: Municipal (Ward 9)
  - Administrative body: Saskatoon City Council
  - Councillor: Bev Dubois

Area
  - Total: 1.99 km^{2} (0.77 sq mi)

Population (2011)
  - Total: 7,732
  - Average Income: $120,042
- Time zone: UTC-6 (UTC)
- Website: Lakeview Community Association

Lakeview is a primarily residential neighbourhood located in the southeast part of Saskatoon, Saskatchewan, Canada. The majority of its residents live in low-density, single detached dwellings, with a sizeable minority of semi-detached or apartment-style multiple unit dwellings. As of 2011, the area is home to 7,732 residents. The neighbourhood is considered a high income area, with an average family income of $120,042, an average dwelling value of $277,070 and a home ownership rate of 71.0%. It was the first community in Saskatoon to feature a man-made lake amenity.

== History ==
The land where Lakeview now exists was annexed in the period between 1975 and 1979. It includes part of the Sutherland Moraine, a ridge that forms a local topographic high. Home construction was at its peak from 1981 until 1985. Lakeview School officially opened on November 24, 1981, and St. Bernard School opened on April 2, 1982. With exception of Taylor Street, McKercher and Stillwater Drives, the streets in Lakeview are named after Saskatchewan lakes.

== Government and politics ==
Lakeview exists within the federal electoral district of Saskatoon—Grasswood. It is currently represented by Kevin Waugh of the Conservative Party of Canada, first elected in 2015.

Provincially, the area is within the constituency of Saskatoon Southeast. It is currently represented by Brittney Senger of the Saskatchewan New Democratic Party, first elected in 2024.

In Saskatoon's non-partisan municipal politics, Lakeview lies within ward 9. It is currently represented by Councillor Bev Dubois, first elected in 2016.

== Institutions ==
=== Education ===
École Lakeview School
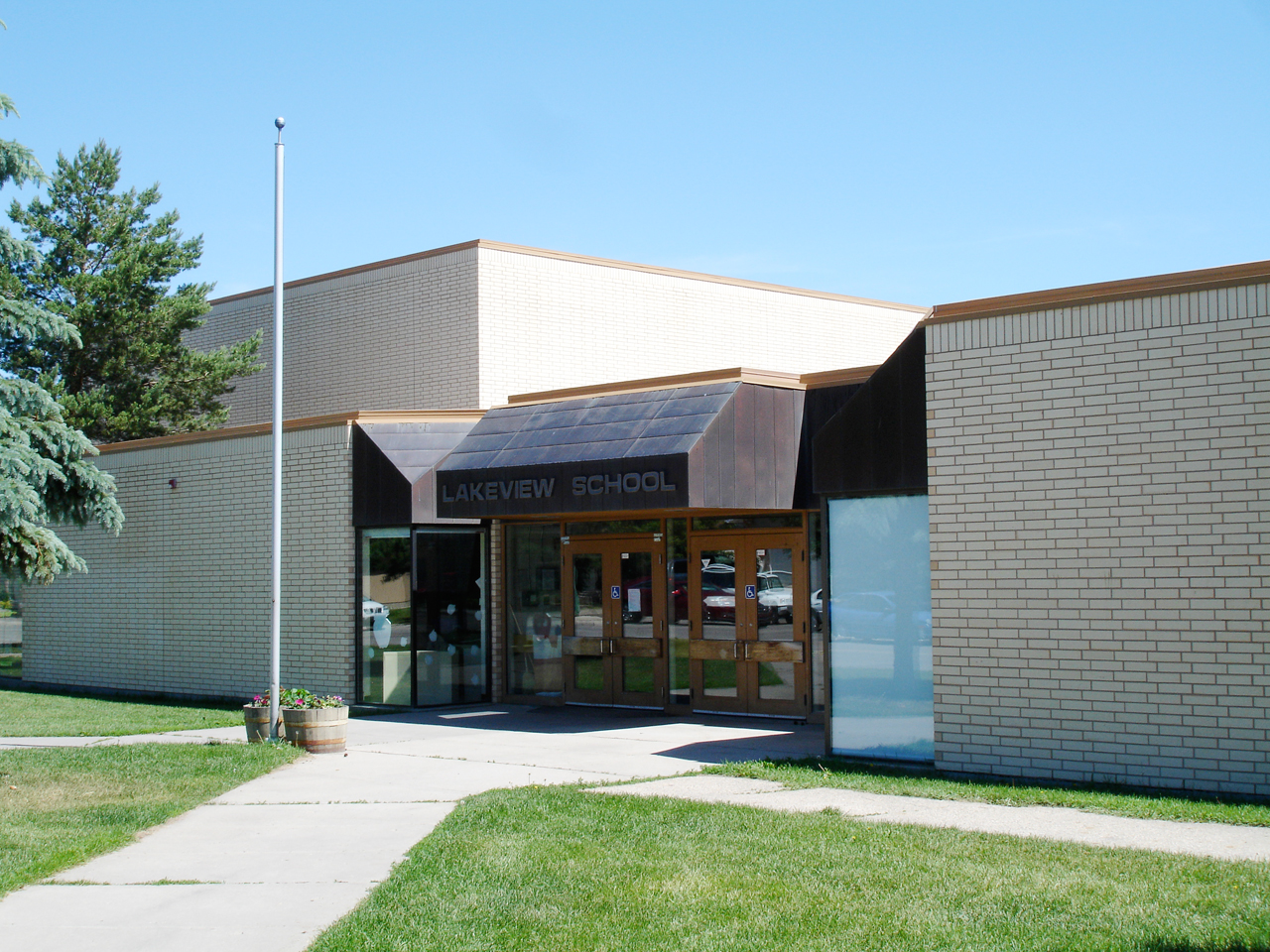

Location
- 527 Kingsmere Boulevard; Saskatoon, Saskatchewan, S7J 3V4; Canada

Information
- Type: Elementary
- Opened: 1981
- School board: Saskatoon Public School Division
- Principal: Shalene Herron
- Grades: Kindergarten to Grade 8
- Enrollment: 566 (2017)
- Education system: Public
- Language: English, French
- Feeder to: Walter Murray Collegiate
- Website: École Lakeview School

St. Bernard School
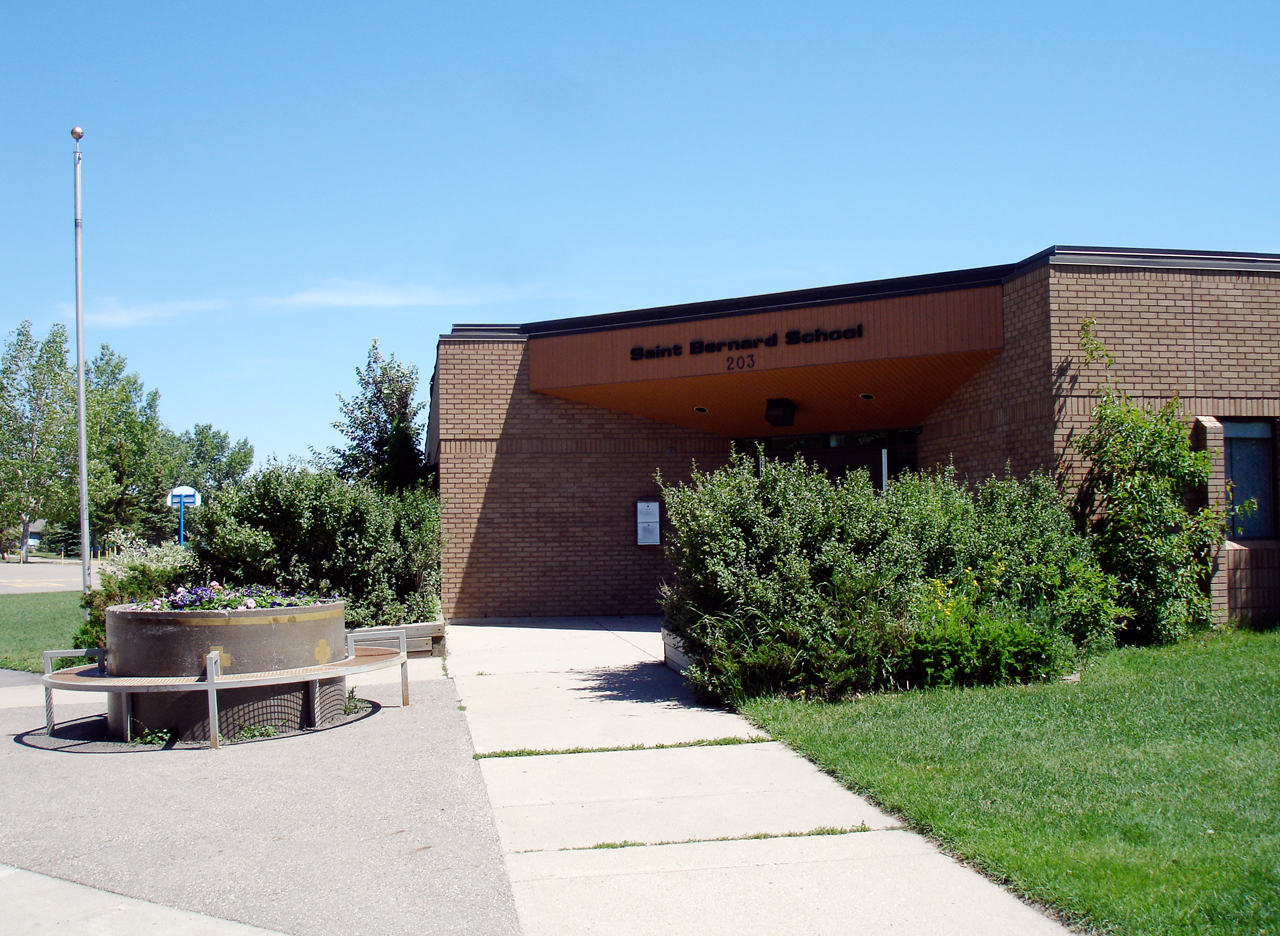

Location
- 203 Whiteshore Crescent; Saskatoon, Saskatchewan, S7J 3W4; Canada

Information
- Type: Elementary
- Religious affiliation: Catholic
- Opened: 1981
- School board: Greater Saskatoon Catholic Schools
- Principal: Kris Hanson
- Grades: Kindergarten to Grade 8
- Enrollment: 226 (2017)
- Education system: Separate
- Language: English
- Feeder to: Holy Cross High School
- Website: St. Bernard School

- École Lakeview School - public elementary, part of the Saskatoon Public School Division
- St. Bernard School - separate (Catholic) elementary, part of Greater Saskatoon Catholic Schools

== Parks and recreation ==
- Lakeview District Park (10.7 acres)
- Lakeview Park (19.6 acres)

The Lakeview Community Association delivers a wide range of social, recreational, educational, and leisure programs. Volunteers also coordinate sports for children/youth and organize local events to raise funds for rink maintenance, park improvements, sports uniforms and more.

== Commercial ==
There are two small areas of commercial development in Lakeview. One is located on Taylor Street between Acadia Drive and Kingsmere Boulevard, and includes two office buildings and a mini-mall. The other is a strip mall on the corner of McKercher Drive and Stillwater Drive. The closest major commercial areas are 8th Street East to the north (including The Centre at Circle and 8th shopping mall), Market Mall a short distance to the west, and the Lakewood Suburban Centre to the east. There are 188 home-based businesses in Lakeview.

== Location ==
Lakeview is located within the Lakewood Suburban Development Area. It is bounded by Taylor Street to the north, Weyakwin Drive and Wollaston Crescent to the east, Highway 16 to the south, and Circle Drive to the west. Inside those boundaries, the roads are a mix of local roads and collector roads.
