= College Park, Saskatoon =

Neighbourhood in Saskatoon, Saskatchewan, Canada

College Park
- City of Saskatoon neighbourhood
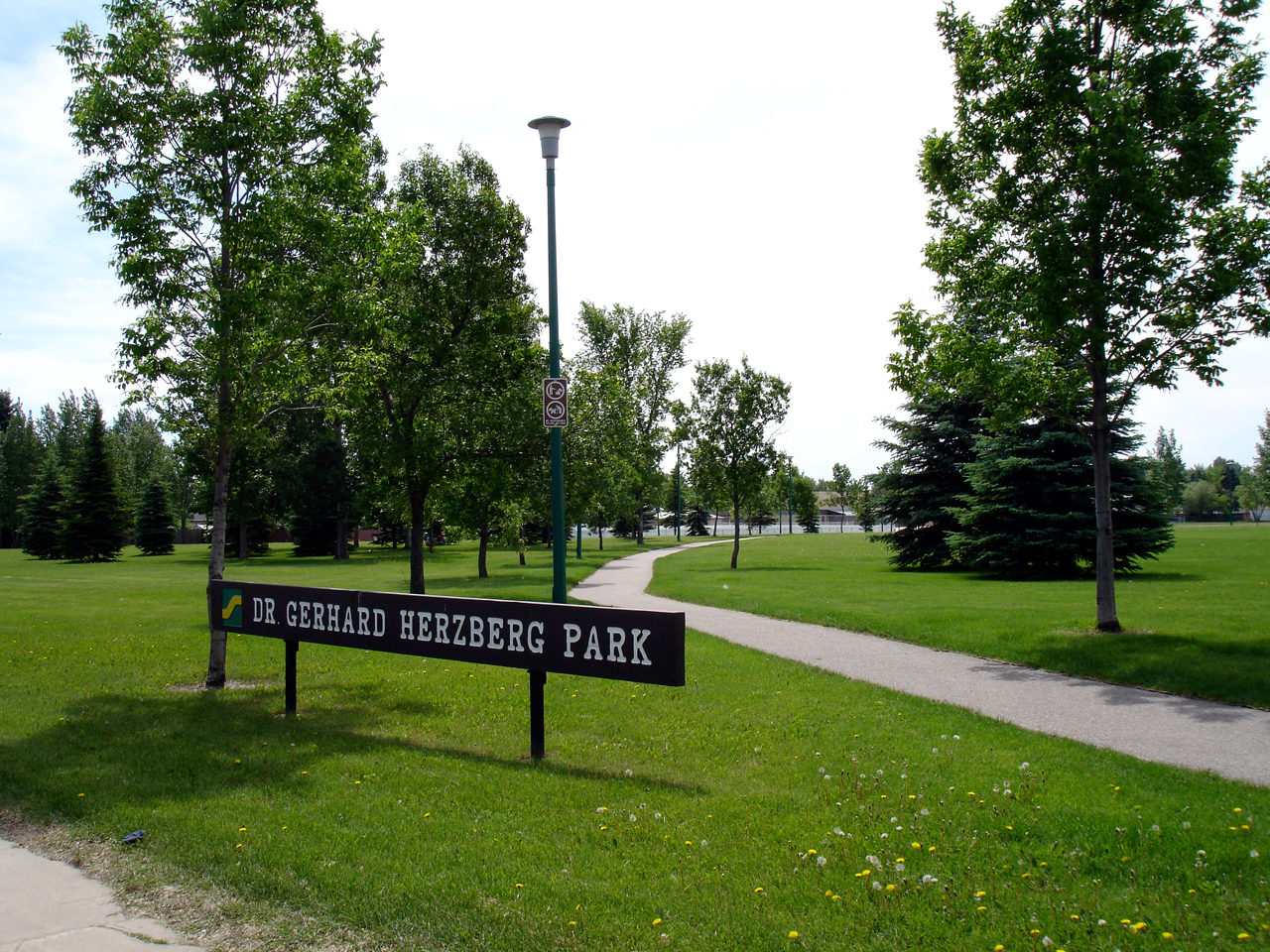
- Dr. Gerhard Herzberg Park

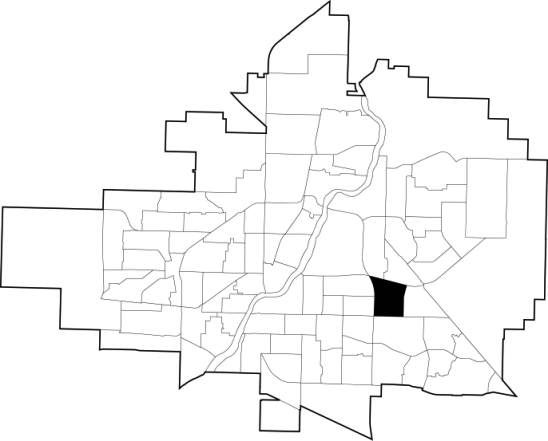
- College Park location map
- Coordinates: 52°7′16″N 106°35′42″W
- Country: Canada
- Province: Saskatchewan
- City: Saskatoon
- Suburban Development Area: Lakewood
- Neighbourhood: College Park
- Annexed: 1955-1959
- Construction: 1961-1980

Government
  - Type: Municipal (Ward 8)
  - Administrative body: Saskatoon City Council
  - Councillor: Sarina Gersher

Area
  - Total: 1.78 km^{2} (0.69 sq mi)

Population (2011)
  - Total: 5,470
  - Average Income: $65,133
- Time zone: UTC-6 (UTC)
- Website: www.collegeparksaskatoon.com

College Park is a primarily residential neighbourhood located in the east-central part of Saskatoon, Saskatchewan, Canada. The majority of its residents live in single-family detached dwellings, with a sizable minority of high-density, multiple-unit dwellings. As of 2011, the area is home to 5,470 residents. The neighbourhood is considered a middle-income area, with an average family income of $65,133, an average dwelling value of $232,228 and a home ownership rate of 58.9%.

== History ==
Before being part of Saskatoon, the land for College Park was used for agriculture. George Stephenson, who ranched in the Dundurn area in the 1880s, operated a dairy farm in along 8th Street until 1911. The intersection of 8th Street and Central Avenue (now Acadia Drive) was referred to as "Stephenson's Corner" for many years. The streetcar line from Saskatoon to Sutherland ran east down 8th Street and turned north into Sutherland.

The land where College Park now exists was annexed in the period between 1955 and 1959. Home construction was at its peak from 1961 until 1980, though the "College Park" name wasn't applied until the late 1960s. As late as 1965 the community was being promoted by homebuilders under the name East Greystone (after the adjacent Greystone Heights).

Many streets are named after Canadian universities and professors. College Park School was opened in 1966.

== Government and politics ==
College Park exists within the federal electoral district of Saskatoon—University. It is currently represented by Corey Tochor of the Conservative Party of Canada, who was first elected in 2019.

Provincially, the area is within the constituency of Saskatoon University-Sutherland. It is currently represented by Tajinder Grewal of the Saskatchewan New Democratic Party, first elected in 2024.

In Saskatoon's non-partisan municipal politics, College Park lies within ward 8. It is currently represented by Councillor Scott Ford, who was first elected in 2016.

== Institutions ==
=== Education ===
École Cardinal Leger School
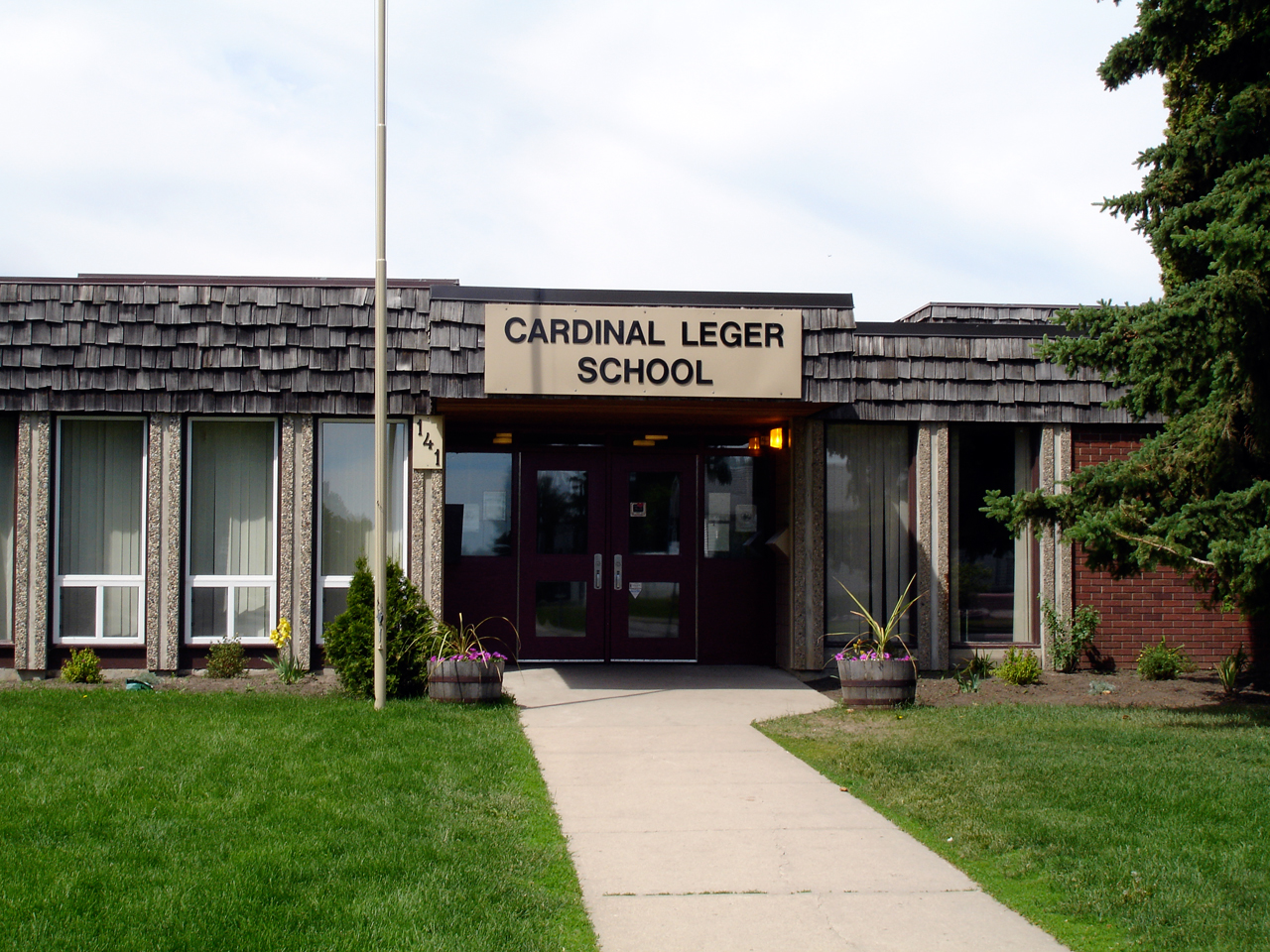
- 141 Campion Crescent; Saskatoon, Saskatchewan, S7H 3T8; Canada

Information
- Type: Elementary
- Religious affiliation: Catholic
- Opened: 1969
- School board: Greater Saskatoon Catholic Schools
- Principal: Wanda Spooner
- Grades: Kindergarten to Grade 8
- Enrollment: 360 (2017)
- Education system: Separate
- Language: English, French Immersion
- Feeder to: St. Joseph High School
- Website: École Cardinal Leger School

École College Park School
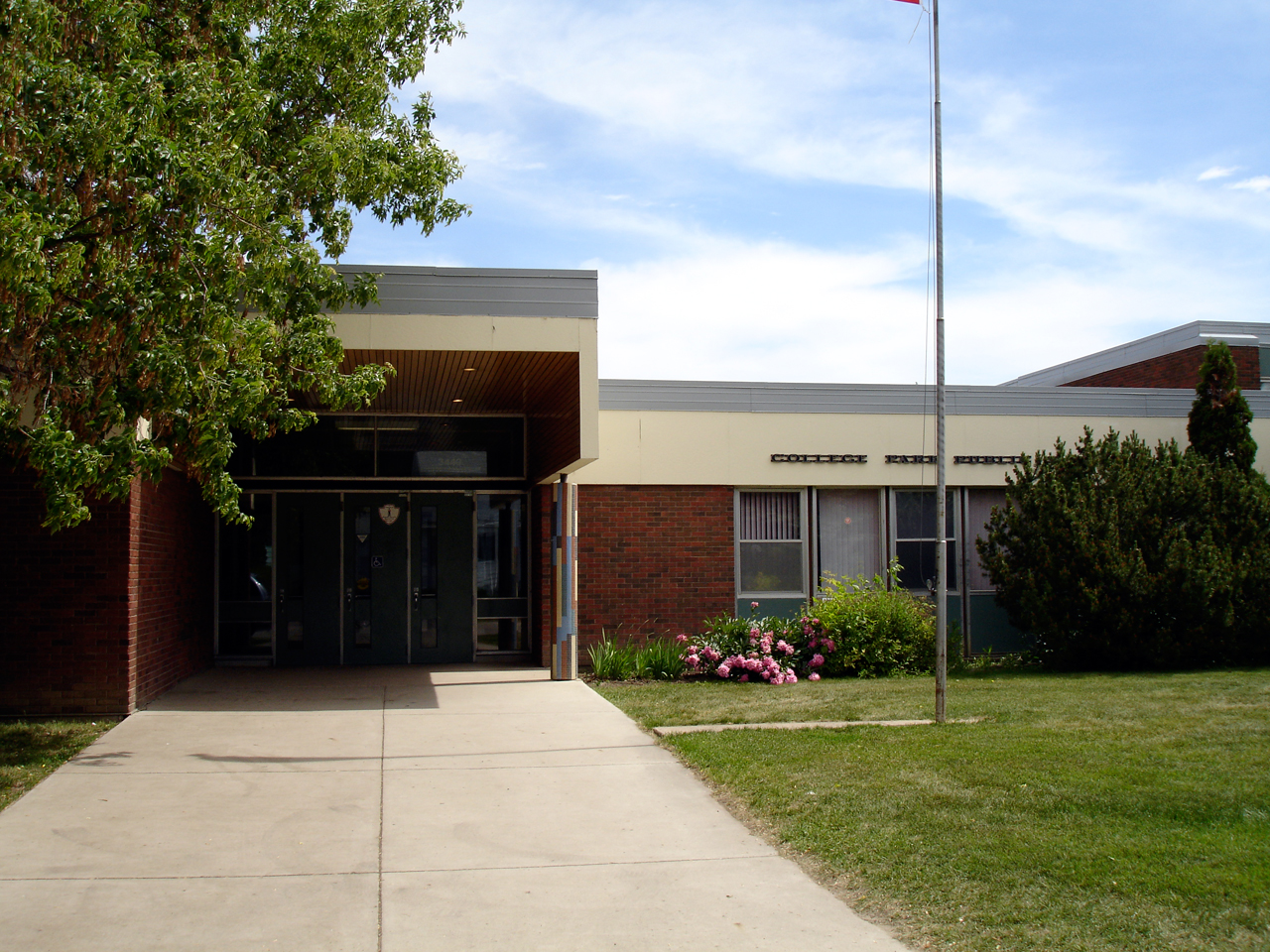
- 3440 Harrington Street; Saskatoon, Saskatchewan, S7H 3Y4; Canada

Information
- Type: Elementary
- Opened: 1966
- School board: Saskatoon Public School Division
- Principal: Donna Arsenault
- Grades: Kindergarten to Grade 8
- Enrollment: 446 (2017)
- Education system: Public
- Language: English, French Immersion
- Feeder to: Evan Hardy Collegiate
- Website: École College Park School

- École Cardinal Leger School - separate (Catholic) elementary, part of Greater Saskatoon Catholic Schools
- École College Park School - public elementary, part of the Saskatoon Public School Division
- Evan Hardy Collegiate - public secondary, part of the Saskatoon Public School Division

== Parks and recreation ==
- Glacier Park North (1.0 acres)
- Glacier Park South (3.1 acres)
- Dr. Gerhard Herzberg Park (16.0 acres)

The College Park Community Association coordinates sports for youth, delivers recreational and leisure programs for all ages, and organizes social and fundraising events.

== Commercial ==
The southern boundary of College Park is the east end of the 8th Street business district. Several strip malls, including the Circle Centre Mall and the College Park Mall, line the street from Circle Drive to McKercher Drive. There is also a mini-mall with businesses along the north leg of Acadia Drive. A major enclosed shopping mall, The Centre, lies on the south side of 8th Street in neighboring Wildwood.

== Location ==
College Park is located within the Lakewood Suburban Development Area. It is bounded by 8th Street to the south, McKercher Drive to the east, College Drive to the north, and Circle Drive to the west. Inside those boundaries, the roads are a mix of local roads and collector roads.
