= Wildwood, Saskatoon =

Wildwood
- City of Saskatoon neighbourhood
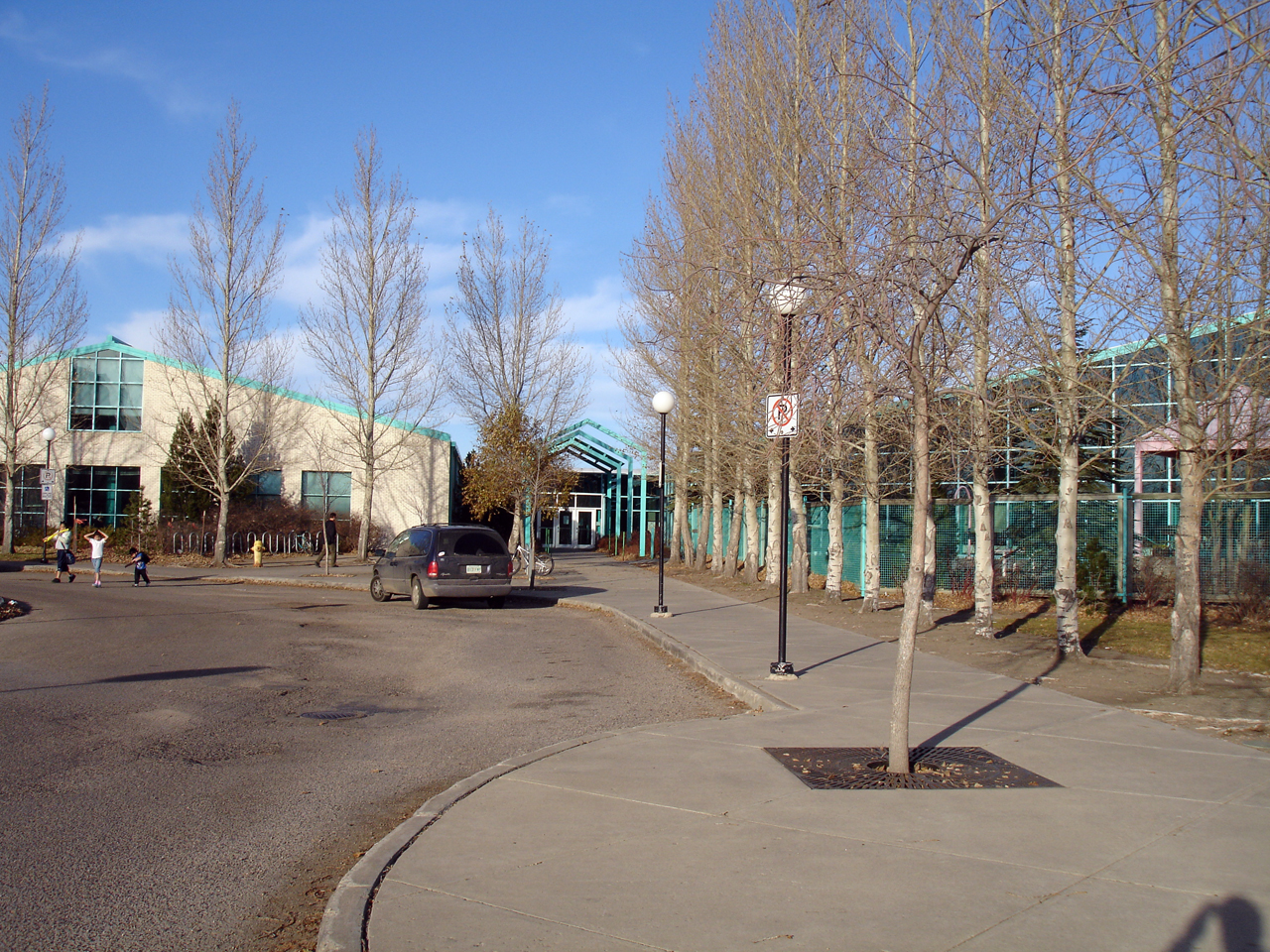
- Lakewood Civic Centre

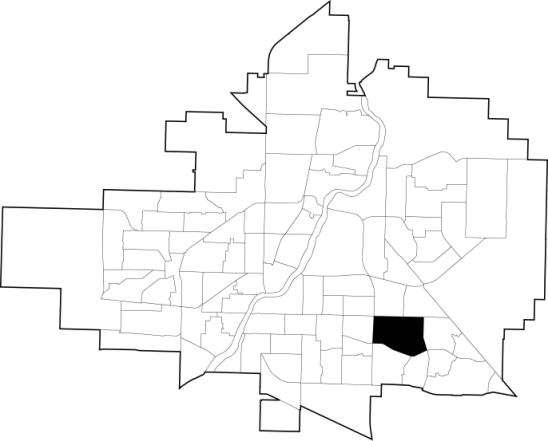
- Wildwood location map
- Coordinates: 52°6′20″N 106°35′10″W
- Country: Canada
- Province: Saskatchewan
- City: Saskatoon
- Suburban Development Area: Lakewood
- Neighbourhood: Wildwood
- Annexed: 1970-1974
- Construction: 1971-1980

Government
  - Type: Municipal (Ward 9)
  - Administrative body: Saskatoon City Council
  - Councillor: Bev Dubois

Area
  - Total: 2.8 km^{2} (1.1 sq mi)

Population (2016)
  - Total: 7,645
  - Average Income: $37,770
- Time zone: UTC-6 (UTC)
- Website: Wildwood Community Association

Wildwood is a primarily residential neighbourhood located in the southeast part of Saskatoon, Saskatchewan, Canada. It includes part of the 8th Street business district. The majority of its residents live in a townhouse or apartment-style multiple unit dwellings, with a sizeable minority of low-density, single detached dwellings. As of 2016, the area is home to 7,645 residents. The neighbourhood has an average family income of $37,770, a homeownership rate of 67.0% and an average home sale price of $300,327.

== History ==
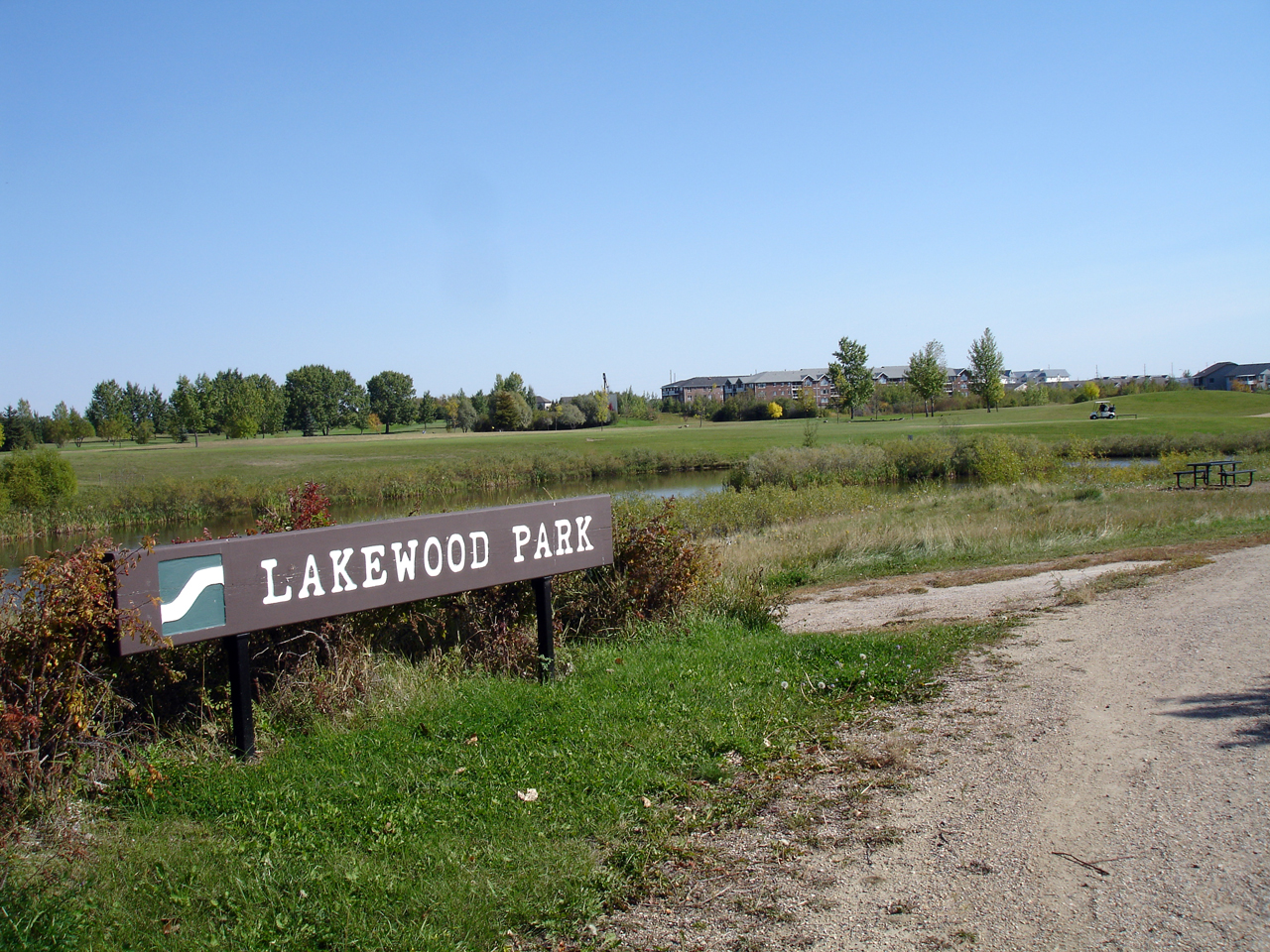
Lakewood Park

Before being part of Saskatoon, the land for Wildwood was used for agriculture. It includes part of the Sutherland Moraine, a ridge that forms a local topographic high. George Stephenson, who ranched in the Dundurn area in the 1880s, operated a dairy farm along 8th Street until 1911. The intersection of 8th Street and Central Avenue (now Acadia Drive) was referred to as "Stephenson's Corner" for many years. The streetcar line from Saskatoon to Sutherland ran east down 8th Street and turned north into Sutherland.

The Wildwood Golf Course existed before any residential development occurred. It opened on July 1, 1931, and was Saskatoon's first golf course. The city purchased the golf course in 1964 for $120,000. As well, the Saskatoon Stock Car Racing Association operated a racing oval on land between the present-day Moss Avenue and McKercher Drive. In 1968, the SSRCA had to find another home when the City of Saskatoon announced its intention to expand eastward and annex the land.

The land where Wildwood now exists was annexed in the period between 1970 and 1974, and the golf course's name was chosen for the name of the new neighbourhood. Home construction was at its peak from 1971 until 1980. Wildwood School opened on May 9, 1978. Bishop Pocock School opened in 1978, and the Lakewood Civic Centre was opened in 1988.

== Government and politics ==
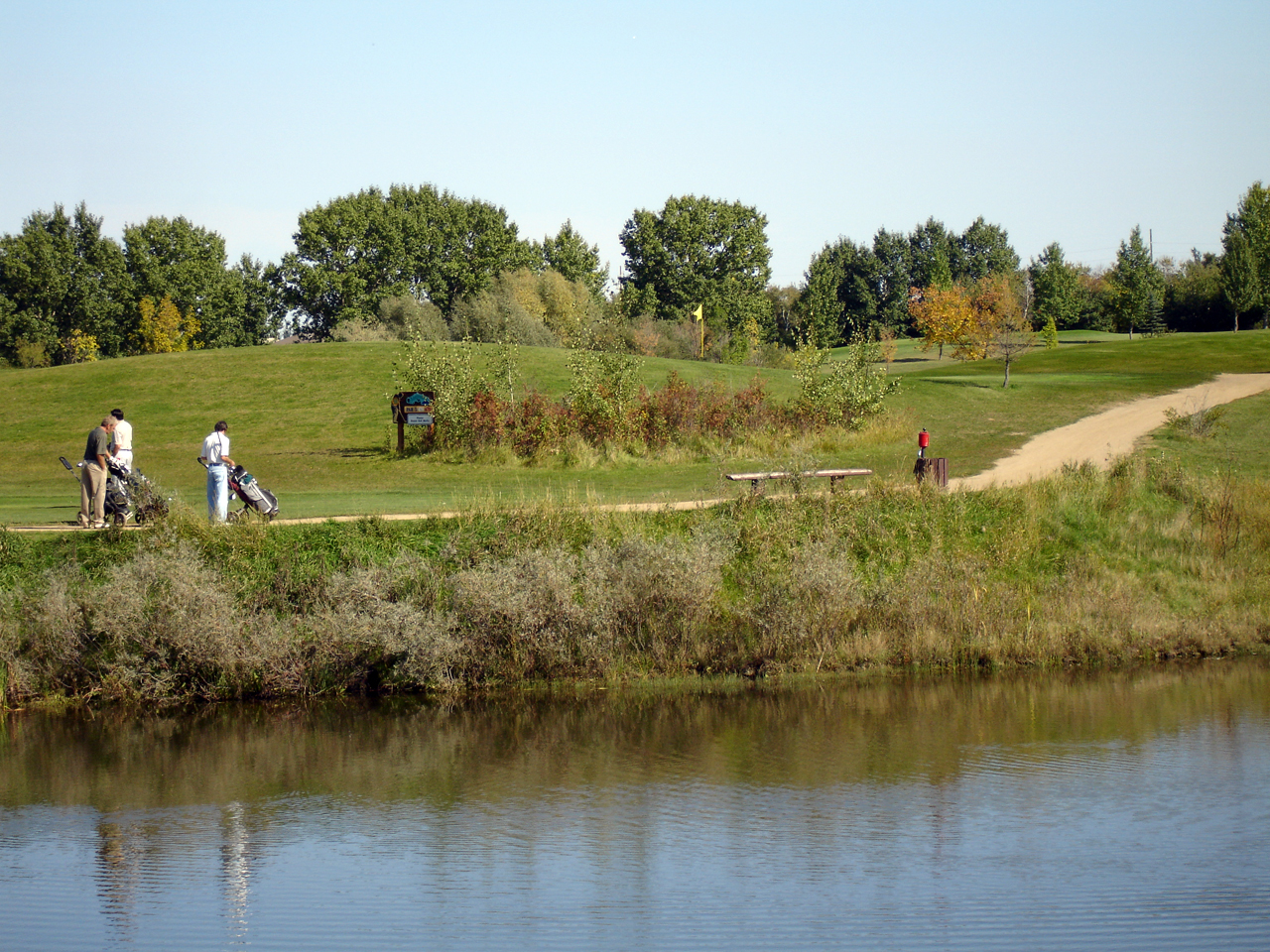
Wildwood Golf Course

Wildwood exists within the federal electoral district of Saskatoon—Grasswood. It is currently represented by Kevin Waugh of the Conservative Party of Canada, first elected in 2015.

Provincially, the area is divided by Heritage Crescent into the constituencies of Saskatoon Churchill-Wildwood and Saskatoon Southeast. Saskatoon Churchill-Wildwood is currently represented by Lisa Lambert of the Saskatchewan Party since 2016. Saskatoon Southeast is currently represented by Don Morgan of the Saskatchewan Party since 2003.

In Saskatoon's non-partisan municipal politics, Wildwood lies within ward 9. It is currently represented by Councillor Bev Dubois, first elected in 2016.

== Institutions ==
=== Education ===
Bishop Pocock School
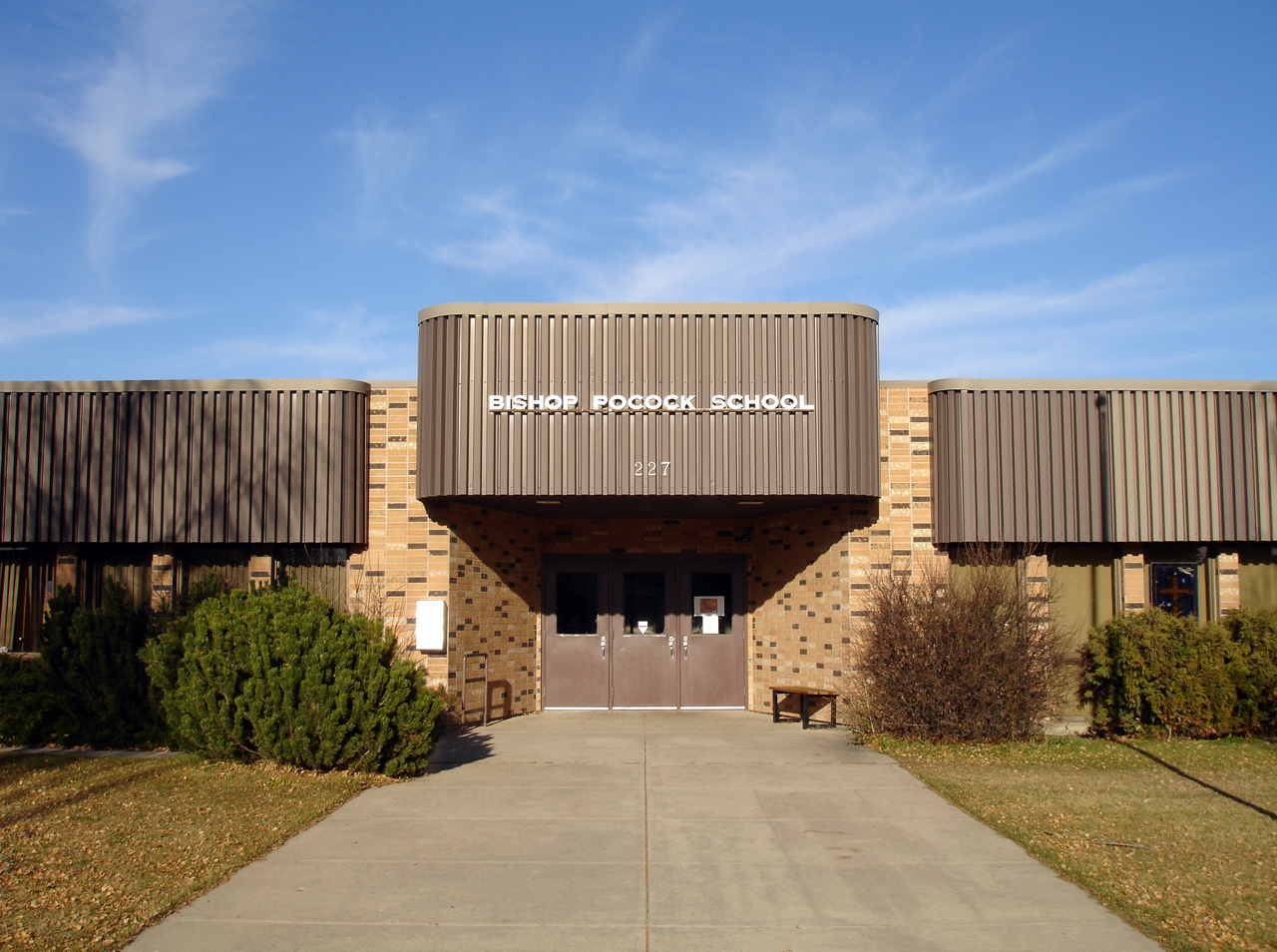
- 227 Avondale Road; Saskatoon, Saskatchewan, S7H 5A5; Canada

Information
- Type: Elementary
- Religious affiliation: Catholic
- Opened: 1977
- School board: Greater Saskatoon Catholic Schools
- Principal: Andrew Novecosky
- Grades: Kindergarten to Grade 8
- Enrollment: 166 (2017)
- Education system: Separate
- Language: English
- Feeder to: Holy Cross High School
- Website: Bishop Pocock School

Wildwood School
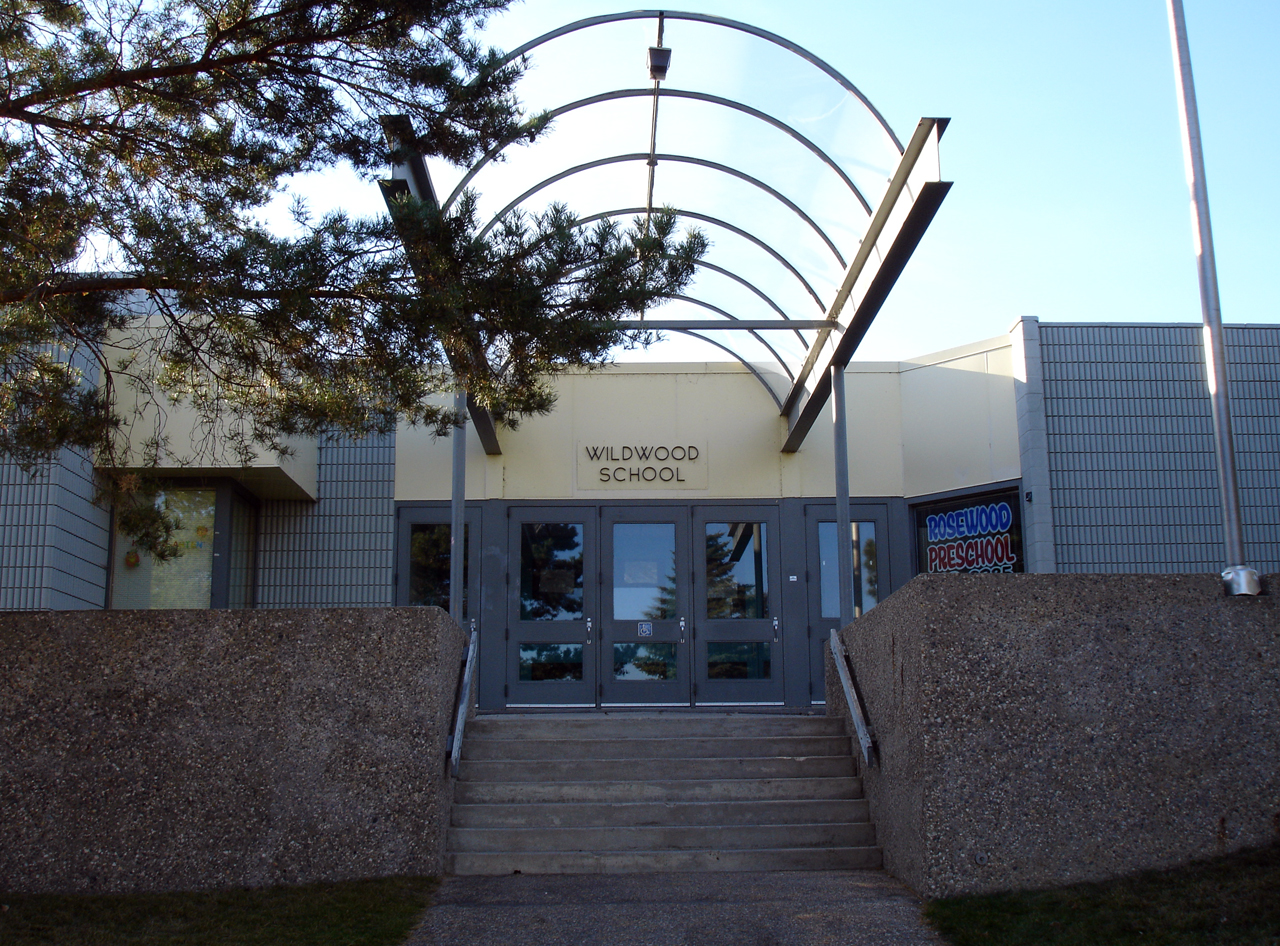
- 203 Rosedale Road; Saskatoon, Saskatchewan, S7H 5H1; Canada

Information
- Type: Elementary
- Opened: 1978
- School board: Saskatoon Public School Division
- Principal: Candace Ahmed
- Grades: Kindergarten to Grade 8
- Enrollment: 227 (2017)
- Education system: Public
- Feeder to: Walter Murray Collegiate
- Website: Wildwood School

- Bishop Pocock School - separate (Catholic) elementary, part of Greater Saskatoon Catholic Schools
- Cliff Wright Branch Library - officially opened on January 9, 1989, as part of the Lakewood Civic Centre.
- Wildwood School - public elementary, part of the Saskatoon Public School Division

=== Public Safety ===
- Fire Station #6 - covers the southeast area of Saskatoon. This hall has a one captain and four firefighters that work on each of the four shifts.

== Parks and recreation ==
- Heritage Green - 1.65 acres (0.67 ha)
- Heritage Park - 9.1 acres (3.7 ha)
- Lakewood Park, district section - 14.51 acres (5.87 ha)
- Wildwood Park - 20.61 acres (8.34 ha)
- Lakewood Park, multi-district section - 25.34 acres (10.25 ha)

Parts of Lakewood Park are landscaped with natural prairie grassland vegetation. As well, the park contains a constructed wetland area, designed to remove pollutants from stormwater and control runoff. The wetland's waters and native plants in turn provide habitat for native aquatic animals, insects, and birds.

The Wildwood Community Association coordinates recreational programs and social activities, maintains the park and outdoor rink, and promotes the well-being of residents. The volunteer-run association also provides a voice for the community on issues of local concern.

The Lakewood Civic Centre houses a swimming pool and waterslide, fitness facilities, meeting and recreational space, and the Cliff Wright Branch Library all in one facility.

The Wildwood Golf Course is an 18-hole course that has an intermediate level of play. It includes a practice green, pro shop and coffee shop.

== Commercial ==
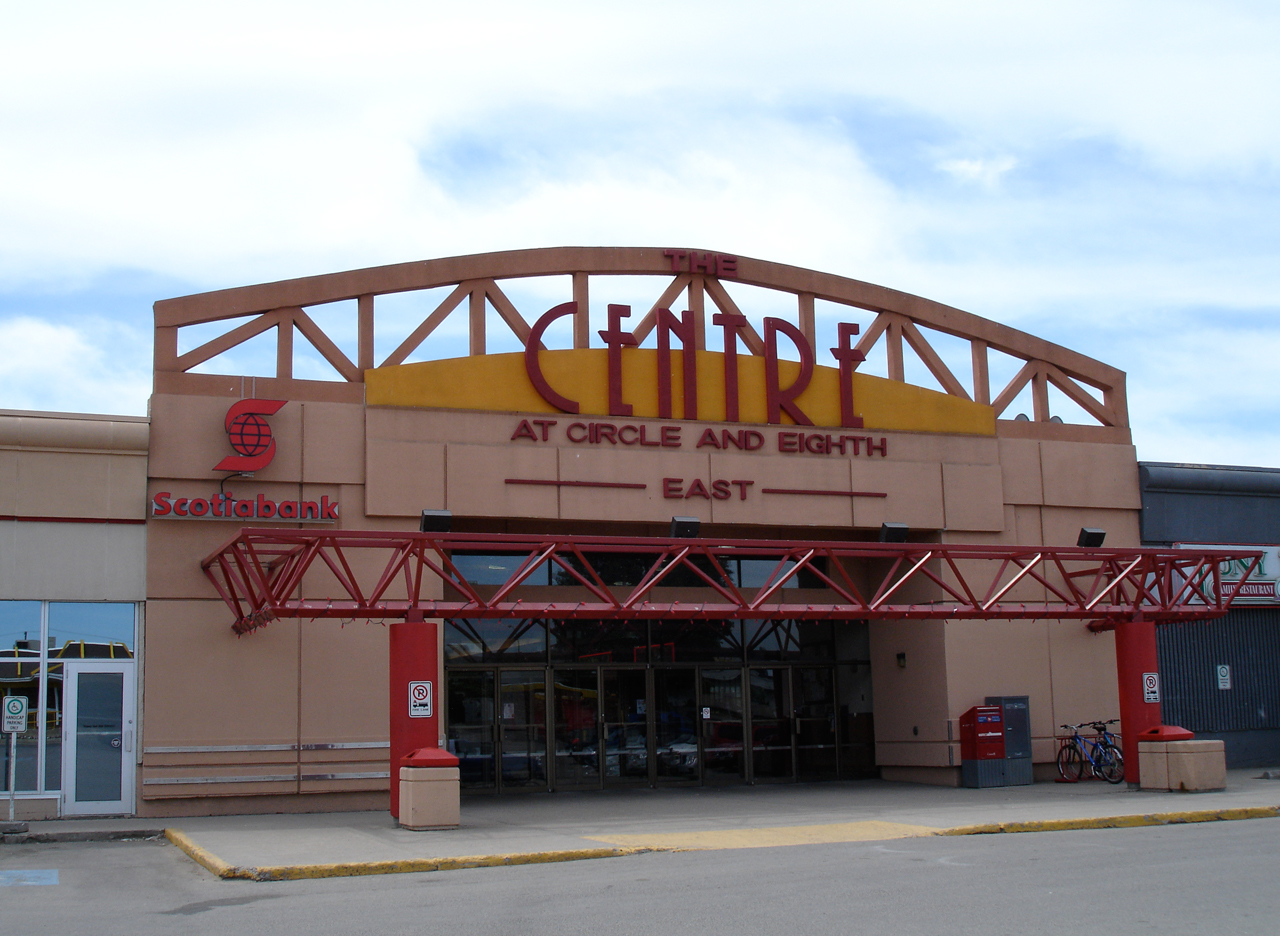
Centre Mall East

Wildwood's northern border includes the eastern end of the 8th Street business district. Predating Wildwood's residential development to the south, the County Fair Plaza shopping centre operated at Circle Drive and 8th Street and included a Zellers department store and Canada Safeway. In 1977, Wildwood Mall opened across Acadia Drive from County Fair Plaza on the former Stephenson dairy farm land and added retailers such as Woolco (and later Wal-Mart) to the area. In the mid-1980s, County Fair Plaza was expanded into a larger mall called Circle Centre Mall. In the late 1990s, Wildwood Mall (which had been struggling since losing one of its anchor tenants, Dominion grocery stores) and Circle Park merged to become The Centre at Circle and 8th, which was later rebranded The Centre, with the two malls linked via a tunnel under Acadia Drive. In addition to The Centre, a few satellite businesses are located in freestanding buildings along 8th Street, straddling the mall property.

== Location ==
Wildwood is located within the Lakewood Suburban Development Area. It is bounded by 8th Street to the north, Boychuk Drive to the east, Taylor Street to the south, and Circle Drive to the west. Inside those boundaries, the roads are a mix of local and collector roads. McKercher Drive, a north-south arterial road, roughly bisects the neighbourhood; Acadia Drive is another north-south arterial road in the west half of Wildwood.
