= Rosewood, Saskatoon =

Rosewood
- Neighbourhood
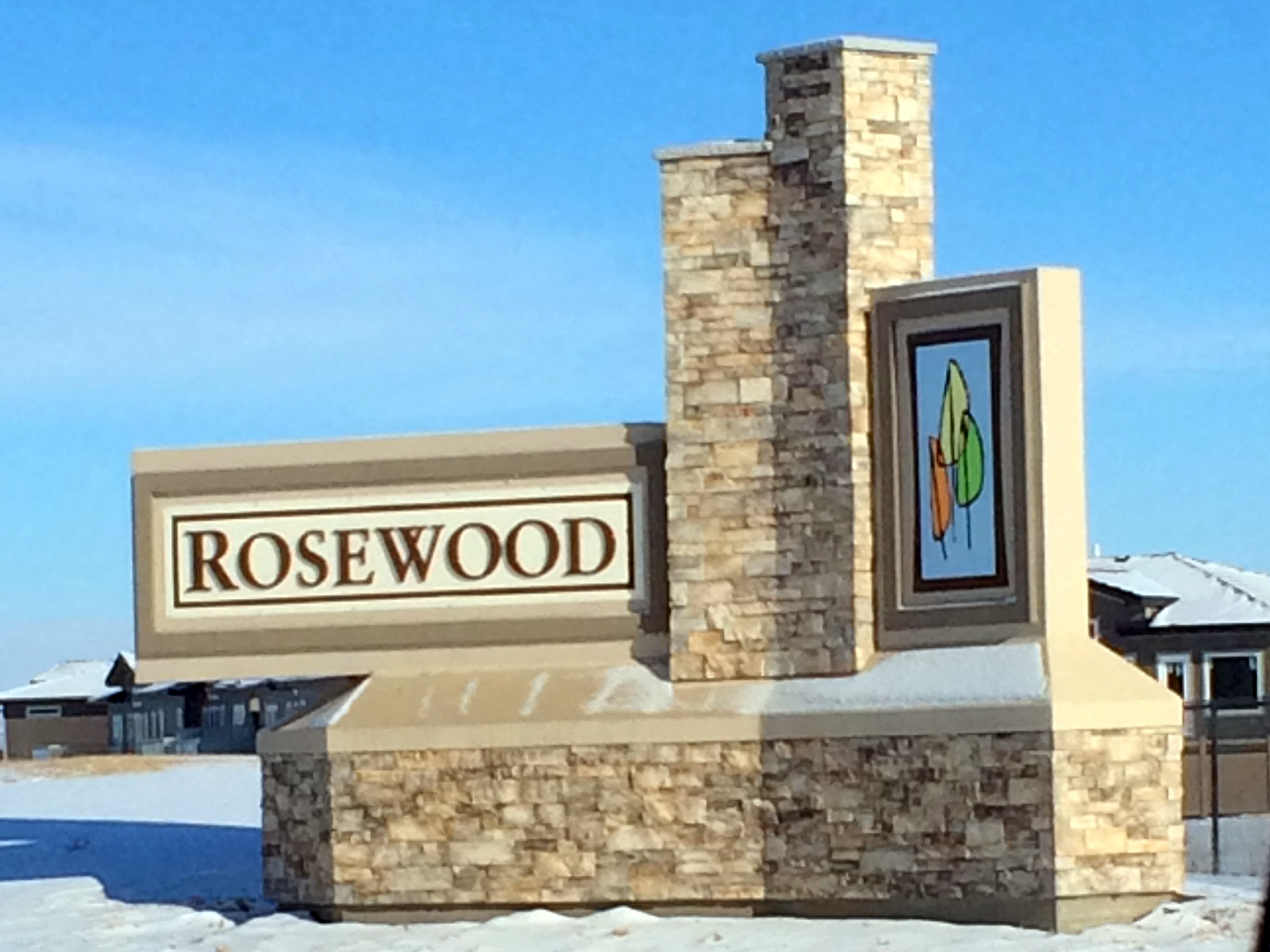
- Rosewood entrance sign

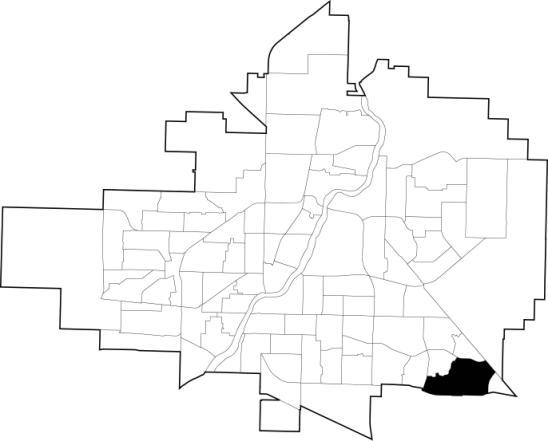
- Rosewood location map
- Coordinates: 52°5′38″N 106°32′42″W
- Country: Canada
- Province: Saskatchewan
- City: Saskatoon
- Suburban Development Area: Lakewood
- Neighbourhood: Rosewood
- Annexed: 1980-1984
- Construction: 2009-

Government
  - Type: Municipal (Ward 9)
  - Administrative body: Saskatoon City Council
  - Councillor: Bev Dubois

Area
  - Total: 2.93 km^{2} (1.13 sq mi)

Population (2022)
  - Total: 6,845
  - Average income: $104,964
- Time zone: UTC-6 (UTC)
- Website: www.myrosewood.ca

Rosewood is a primarily residential neighbourhood under construction in southeast Saskatoon, Saskatchewan, Canada. The majority of its residents live in single detached dwellings. In 2011, the area was home to 73 residents. In early 2015 there were approximately 900 occupied residences. The neighbourhood is considered a high-income area, with an average family income of $104,964, and a home ownership rate of 93.3%.

== History ==
The land where Rosewood is planned to exist was annexed between 1980 and 1984. It was considered challenging to develop - the area is dotted with sloughs and has a high water table. The majority of the wetlands were drained and filled with a single large wetland complex modified and used for drainage, eliminating the need for some storm sewer mains. Servicing of the land began in 2008, and home construction in the first phase of the community was underway in the summer of 2009.

The southwest corner of the community will consist of a commercial hub and multi-family dwellings, while a village square with businesses, parks and multi-family dwellings is planned for the centre of the neighbourhood. Housing will consist of 2731 single-unit dwellings and 1760 multi-unit condominium, townhouse and apartment dwellings. Between 2022 and 2025, Rosewood will reach completion and have an estimated population of 10,650. the city of Saskatoon has since updated the master plan eliminating a vital access point to highway 16, adding a large commercial property to the southeast and increasing density on the eastern portion of the subdivision by close to 50%. With a final estimated population exceeding 12,000.

Major access roads carry the Rosewood name, but street names assigned thus far by the city such as Ledingham, Rochelle, and Hastings, show no set pattern, other than to honour notable Saskatonians. One street name that attracted media attention when it was assigned in 2011 was Tweed Lane, named in honor of reality TV star, film actress and onetime Playboy Playmate of the Year Shannon Tweed, at the request of Tourism Saskatoon, which had honored Tweed with a faux street sign bearing the name in 2010.

A proposed amendment to the neighbourhood concept plan would add another 152 acres (62 ha) of land and 1200 people to the area. It incorporates a triangular piece of what was previously dubbed the Southeast Development Area. Originally it had been separated by a future perimeter highway, but in 2014 the alignment of the roadway was being reviewed, making the adjacent land available as an addition to the neighbourhood. The land was ultimately assigned for commercial use, and the city's second Costco outlet opened there in 2016.

== Government and politics ==
Rosewood exists within the federal electoral district of Saskatoon—Grasswood. It is currently represented by Kevin Waugh of the Conservative Party of Canada, first elected in 2015.

Provincially, the area is in the constituency of Saskatoon Southeast. It is currently represented by Don Morgan of the Saskatchewan Party, first elected in 2003 and re-elected in 2007, 2011 and 2016.

In Saskatoon's non-partisan municipal politics, Rosewood lies within ward 9. It is currently represented by Councillor Bev Dubois, first elected in 2016.

== Institutions ==
=== Education ===
Colette Bourgonje School
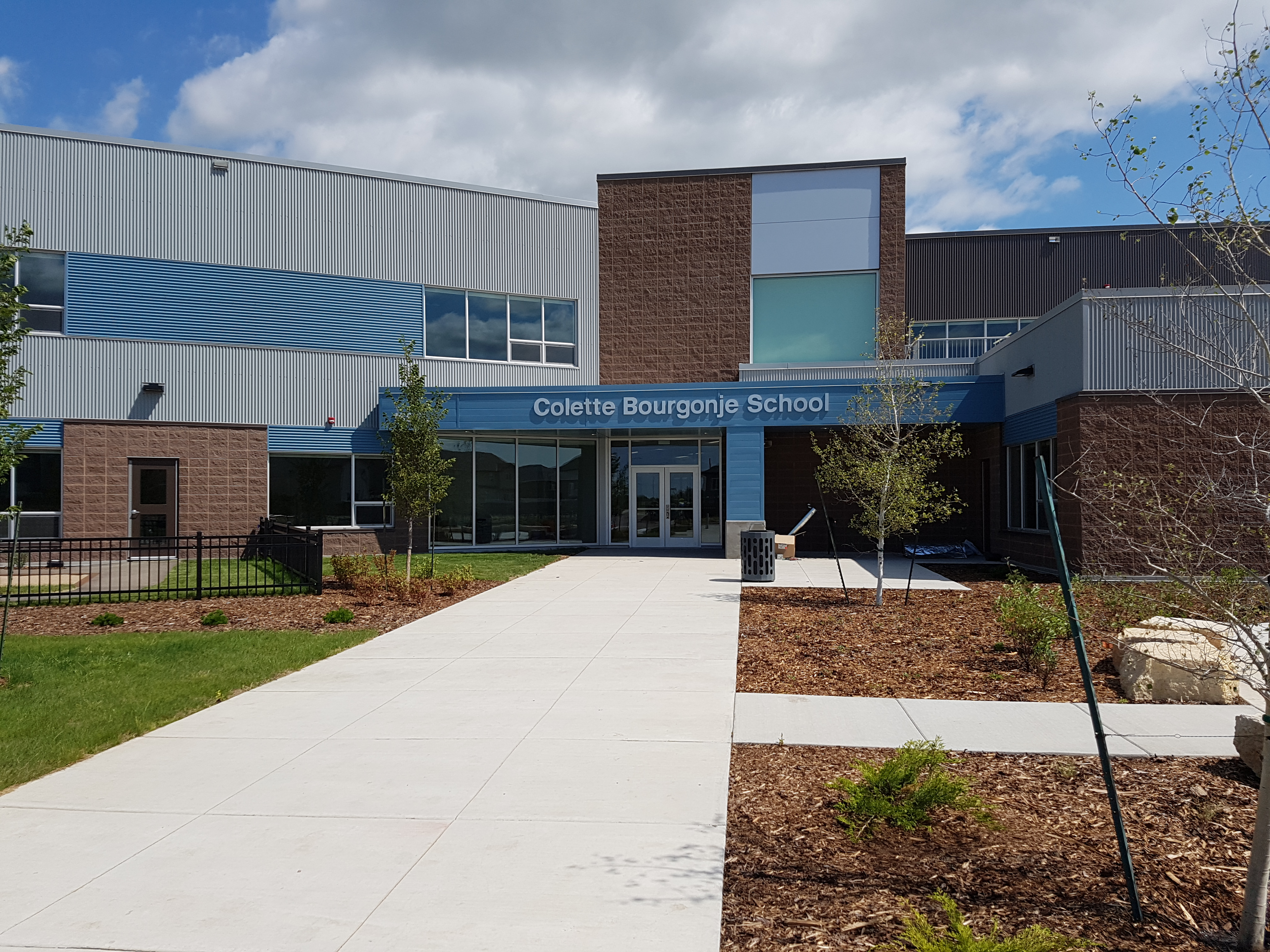
- 169 Olson Lane West; Saskatoon, Saskatchewan, S7V 0L1; Canada

Information
- Type: Elementary
- Opened: 2017
- School board: Saskatoon Public School Division
- Principal: Curtis Shepherd
- Grades: Kindergarten to Grade 8
- Enrollment: 344 (2017)
- Education system: Public
- Language: English
- Feeder to: Walter Murray Collegiate
- Website: Colette Bourgonje School

St. Thérèse of Lisieux Catholic School
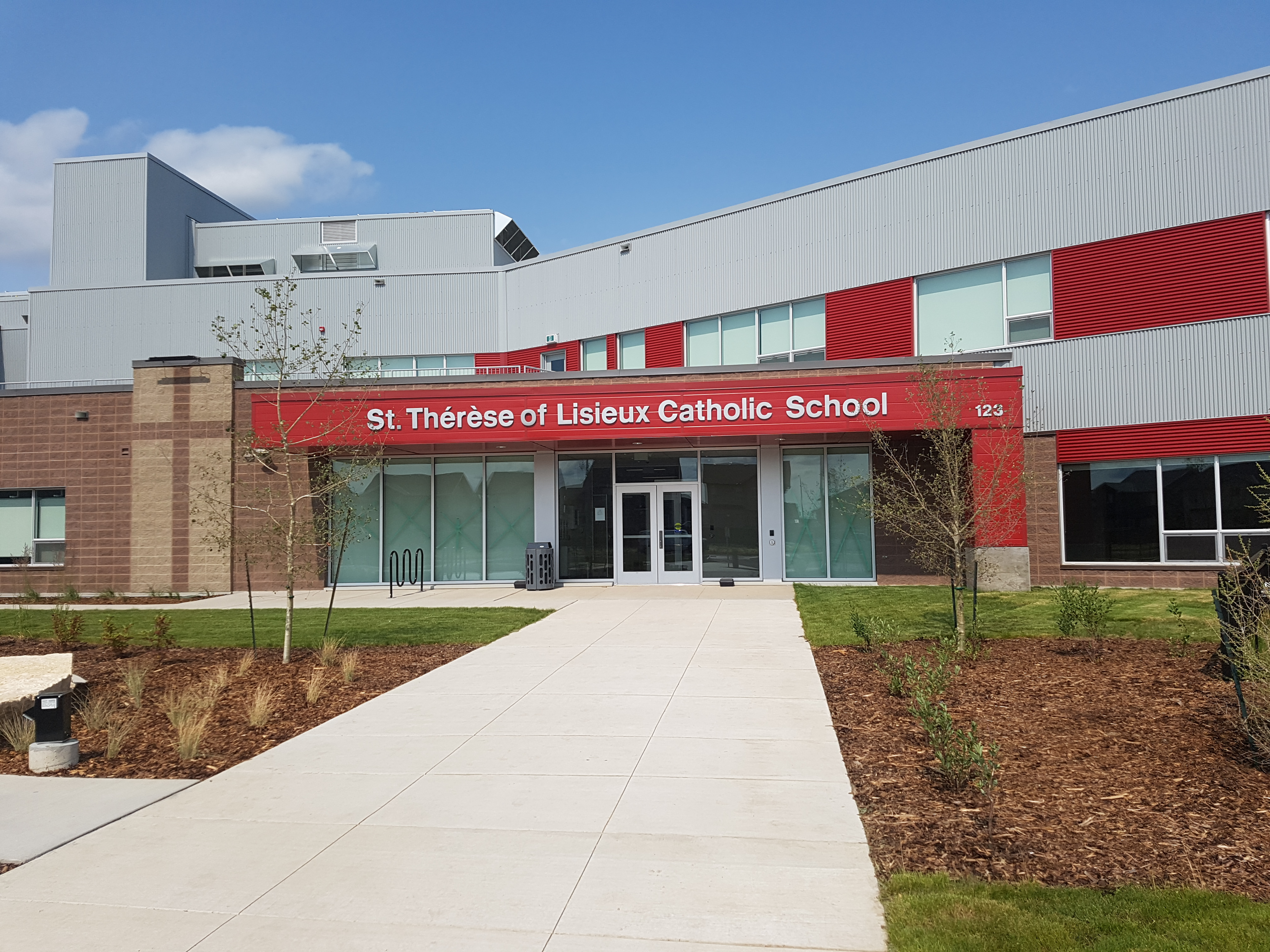
- 123 Olson Lane West; Saskatoon, Saskatchewan, S7V 0L1; Canada

Information
- Type: Elementary
- Religious affiliation: Catholic
- Opened: 2017
- School board: Greater Saskatoon Catholic Schools
- Principal: Tony (Antonio) Bairos
- Grades: Kindergarten to Grade 8
- Enrollment: 165 (2017)
- Education system: Separate
- Language: English
- Feeder to: Holy Cross High School
- Website: St. Thérèse of Lisieux Catholic School

Land was allocated for two schools at the centre of the neighbourhood as part of the planning phase for Rosewood. On October 22, 2013, the provincial government announced funding for four new P3 facilities in Saskatoon, including a joint-use public/separate school facility in Rosewood. Greater Saskatoon Catholic Schools revealed in June 2015 that the division's new elementary school in Rosewood would be named after Thérèse of Lisieux, while Saskatoon Public Schools announced in October 2016 that its new elementary school would be named after Colette Bourgonje. Both schools were completed ahead of the 2017-2018 school year.

== Parks and recreation ==
The current drawings show a core neighbourhood park at the centre of the neighbourhood adjacent to the school and mixed-use "village square" sites. Linear parks link to two neighbourhood parks closer to the east and west peripheries, and two small "pocket" parks in the northeast part of the neighbourhood.

== Commercial ==
The plans for Rosewood show two dedicated commercial zones: one at the southwest entrance to the neighbourhood, and the other surrounding the village square. Another mixed-use site in the northeast is another possible location for businesses. Rosewood is located adjacent to the Lakewood Suburban Centre which already has established commercial development. Eight home-based businesses exist in the neighbourhood. A revision to the community plan released in 2014 shows a large highway commercial area is now proposed for the southeast corner of the development. The first business constructed in the area, Costco, opened in 2016.

== Location ==
Rosewood is located in the Lakewood Suburban Development Area. It is bounded by the Canadian Pacific Railway tracks and a future highway right-of-way to the east, Highway 16 to the south, Boychuk Drive to the west, and Taylor Street to the north. Inside those boundaries, the roads are a mix of local and collector roads.

The current proposal shows that Rosewood will have access points on all four sides of the community, including an access to Highway 16 to the south and the proposed Perimeter Highway to the east. There will be two access roads off Taylor Street, plus one off Boychuk Drive, Rosewood Boulevard West. Both the south Rosewood access road and Boychuck Drive were indicated to have interchanges with Hwy. 16 in the future. Construction of an interchange at Boychuck is under way as of 2017 with completion expected in 2019.
