= Saskatoon Southeast =

Provincial electoral district in Saskatchewan, Canada

Coordinates: 51°59′N 106°30′W

Saskatchewan electoral district

Provincial electoral district
- Legislature: Legislative Assembly of Saskatchewan
MLA
Brittney Senger
New Democratic
- District created: 1991
- First contested: 1991
- Last contested: 2024

Demographics
- Electors: 15,126
- Communities: Saskatoon

Saskatoon Southeast is a provincial electoral district for the Legislative Assembly of Saskatchewan, Canada. Since a boundary redraw in 2022, it currently encompasses the Saskatoon neighbourhoods of Lakeridge, Briarwood, Lakewood, Rosewood, and a small portion of Lakeview, which it lost to the redistributed riding of Saskatoon Eastview.

== History ==
The district was created in 1988 for the 1991 general election as Saskatoon Wildwood, encompassing the Wildwood, Rosewood, Lakewood, Briarwood, The Willows and Stonebridge neighbourhoods of Saskatoon. Before the 1995 general election, the district was reconfigured and expanded to include the rural communities of Grasswood, Floral, Furdale and part of the Rural Municipality of Corman Park. This rural territory was moved to Saskatoon Stonebridge-Dakota in 2012, making it again into an entirely urban constituency for the 2016 general election, this time centered in the neighbourhoods of Lakeview, Lakeridge and Rosewood. For the next general election, the district will be shifted further to the southeast, losing most of Lakeview to Saskatoon Eastview and gaining Briarwood from Saskatoon Stonebridge-Dakota. In the

This district has historically been one of the safest seats for the Saskatchewan Party in Saskatoon, having returned Minister Don Morgan of the Saskatchewan Party to office in every election since the 2003 general election. It was one of the first three Saskatoon area seats the party won that year since its formation in 1997.

== Members of the Legislative Assembly ==
Legislature	Years	Member	Party
Saskatoon Wildwood
22nd	1991–1995	Pat Lorje	New Democratic
Saskatoon Southeast
23rd	1995–1999	Pat Lorje	New Democratic
24th	1999–2003	Pat Lorje	New Democratic
25th	2003–2007	Don Morgan	Saskatchewan Party
26th	2007–2011	Don Morgan	Saskatchewan Party
27th	2011–2016	Don Morgan	Saskatchewan Party
28th	2016–2020	Don Morgan	Saskatchewan Party
29th	2020–2024	Don Morgan	Saskatchewan Party
30th	2024-present	Brittney Senger	New Democratic

== Election results ==
2024 Saskatchewan general election
Party	Candidate	Votes	%	±%
New Democratic	Brittney Senger	4,921	50.53	+17.83
Saskatchewan	John Owojori	4,492	46.13	-18.87
Saskatchewan United	Greg Brkich	216	2.22	–
Green	Mohammad Abushar	109	1.12	-0.88
Total valid votes		9,738	98.37	
Total rejected ballots		161	1.63	
Turnout		9,899	65.65	
Eligible voters		15,078		
New Democratic gain		Swing		
Source: Elections Saskatchewan

2020 provincial election redistributed results
Party	%
Saskatchewan	65.0
New Democratic	32.7
Green	2.0
Buffalo	0.4

2020 Saskatchewan general election
Party	Candidate	Votes	%	±%
Saskatchewan	Don Morgan	5,679	63.58	-4.16
New Democratic	Pamela Beaudin	3,080	34.48	+6.48
Green	Cheryl Mazil	173	1.94	+0.60
Total valid votes		8,932	98.94	
Total rejected ballots		96	1.06	–
Turnout		9,028	59.69	–
Eligible voters		15,126		
Source: Elections Saskatchewan
Saskatchewan hold		Swing		–

2016 Saskatchewan general election
Party	Candidate	Votes	%	±%
Saskatchewan	Don Morgan	5,247	67.74	-7.67
New Democratic	Michael Karras	2,169	28.00	+8.68
Liberal	Pradipta Das	225	2.90	+0.40
Green	Deanna Robilliard	104	1.34	-1.43
Total valid votes		7,745	100.0	
Eligible voters		–		
Saskatchewan hold		Swing		–
Source: Elections Saskatchewan

2011 Saskatchewan general election
Party	Candidate	Votes	%	±%
Saskatchewan	Don Morgan	8,073	75.41	+16.47
NDP	Zubair Sheikh	2,068	19.32	-9.11
Green	Sarah Risk	297	2.77	+1.25
Liberal	Brenda McKnight	268	2.50	-8.61
Total		10,706	100.00	
Saskatchewan hold		Swing		-

2007 Saskatchewan general election
Party	Candidate	Votes	%	±%
Saskatchewan	Don Morgan	6,125	58.94	+18.60
NDP	Jane Wollenberg	2,954	28.43	-4.52
Liberal	Mark Lemstra	1,155	11.11	-14.98
Green	Mike Fornssler	158	1.52	+0.90
Total		10,392	100.00	
Saskatchewan hold		Swing		-

2003 Saskatchewan general election
Party	Candidate	Votes	%	±%
Saskatchewan	Don Morgan	3,343	40.34	+16.38
NDP	John Conway	2,730	32.95	-5.30
Liberal	Zoria Broughton	2,162	26.09	-9.70
New Green	Neil Sinclair	51	0.62	*
Total		8,286	100.00	
Saskatchewan gain from New Democratic		Swing		-

1999 Saskatchewan general election
Party	Candidate	Votes	%	±%
NDP	Pat Lorje	3,172	38.25	-10.74
Liberal	Grant Karwacki	3,134	37.79	-3.53
Saskatchewan	Dennis Reaburn	1,987	23.96	*
Total		8,293	100.00	
New Democratic hold		Swing		-

1995 Saskatchewan general election
Party	Candidate	Votes	%	±%
NDP	Pat Lorje	3,450	48.99	+5.80
Liberal	Wallace Lockhart	2,910	41.32	+9.82
Prog. Conservative	Marcel Guay	682	9.69	-15.62
Total		7,042	100.00	
New Democratic hold		Swing		-

Saskatoon Wildwood

1991 Saskatchewan general election
Party	Candidate	Votes	%	±%
NDP	Pat Lorje	4,282	43.19	*
Liberal	David M. Clark	3,123	31.50	*
Prog. Conservative	Joan Black	2,509	25.31	*
Total		9,914	100.00	

== See also ==
- List of Saskatchewan provincial electoral districts
- List of Saskatchewan general elections
- Canadian provincial electoral districts
