= Greater Saskatoon Catholic Schools =

School district in Saskatchewan, Canada

Greater Saskatoon Catholic Schools (St. Paul's R.C.S.S.D. No. 20)

Address
- 420 22nd Street East Saskatoon, Saskatchewan, S7K 1X3; Canada
- Coordinates: 52.128102°N 106.659098°W

District information
- Type: Separate
- Motto: Putting faith in education!
- Grades: Pre-Kindergarten to Grade 4
- Established: June 14, 1950
- Schools: 53
- Budget: $257,605,522 (2025–26)

Students and staff
- Students: 22,654 (2025)
- Teachers: 1,210.73 (on an FTE basis) (2025–26)
- Staff: 2,338 (on an FTE basis) (2024–25)
- Colours: Green

Other information
- Director of Education: François Rivard
- Board of Directors Chairperson: Diane Boyko
- Teachers' Union: Saskatchewan Teachers' Federation
- Website: Greater Saskatoon Catholic Schools

Greater Saskatoon Catholic Schools (GSCS) is Saskatchewan's largest Catholic school division and the third largest school system in the province.

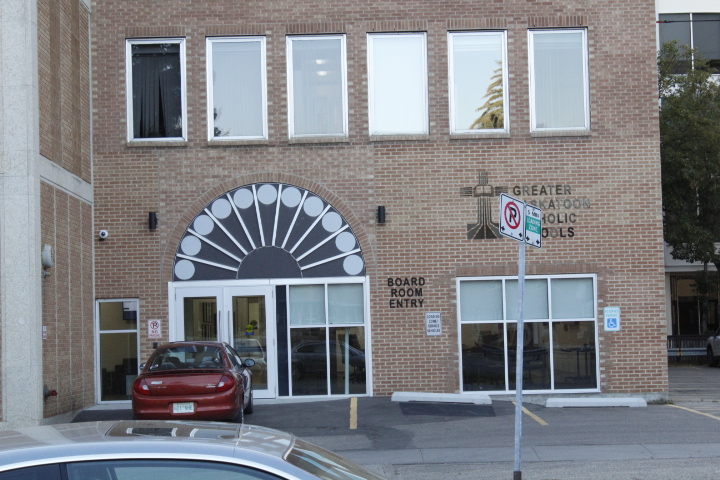

Greater Saskatoon Catholic Schools has approximately 22,000 students, with 50 schools located in Saskatoon and the surrounding rural districts of Biggar, Humboldt, Martensville and Warman. In addition, GSCS co-manages Humboldt Collegiate Institute with Horizon School Division No. 205.

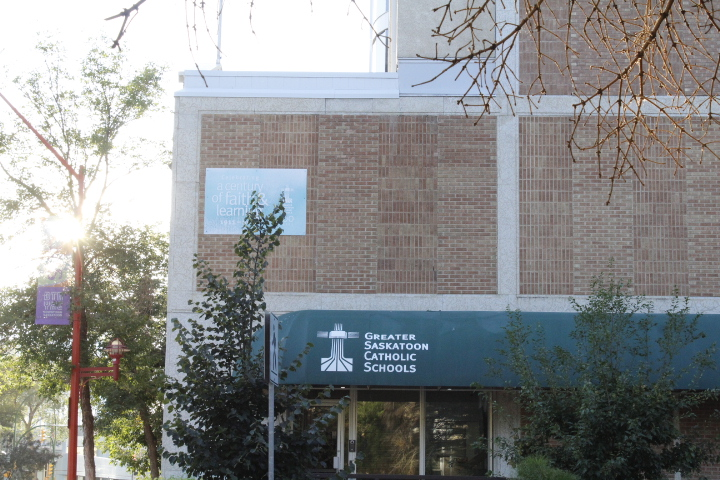

== Elementary schools ==
- awâsisak kâ-nîmîhtocik St. Francis School
- Bishop Filevich Ukrainian Bilingual School
- Bishop Klein Community School
- Bishop Pocock School
- Bishop Roborecki Community School
- École Cardinal Leger School
- École Father Robinson School
- École Sister O'Brien School
- École St. Gerard School
- École St. Luke School
- École St. Matthew School
- École St. Mother Teresa School
- École St. Paul School
- École St. Peter School
- Father Vachon School
- Georges Vanier Catholic Fine Arts School
- Holy Family School
- Pope John Paul II School
- St. Angela School
- St. Anne School
- St. Augustine School
- St. Bernard School
- St. Dominic School
- St. Edward School
- St. George School
- St. John Community School
- St. Kateri Tekakwitha School
- St. Lorenzo Ruiz School
- St. Marguerite School
- St. Maria Goretti Community School
- St. Mark Community School
- St. Mary's Wellness and Education Centre
- St. Michael Community School
- St. Nicholas School
- St. Philip School
- St. Thérèse of Lisieux School
- St. Volodymyr School
- Saskatoon French School (Associate School)

== High schools ==
- Bethlehem Catholic High School
- Bishop James Mahoney High School
- Bishop Murray High School
- E. D. Feehan Catholic High School
- Holy Cross High School
- Oskāyak High School (Associate School)
- St. Joseph High School

== Rural schools ==
- École Holy Mary School – Martensville
- Holy Trinity School – Warman
- Humboldt Collegiate Institute – Humboldt (co-managed with Horizon School Division)
- St. Augustine School – Humboldt
- St. Dominic School – Humboldt
- St. Gabriel School – Biggar

== Special programs ==
- Community Credit Program
- Deaf and Hard of Hearing Program (St. Philip)
- EcoJustice Program (St. Edward)
- Farm School Program (Bishop Murray)
- Living Our Faith Together (LOFT) Program (E. D. Feehan)
- Opening Doors Program (Bishop Murray)
- Saskatoon Catholic Cyber School
- START Program (St. Maria Goretti)
- White Buffalo Youth Lodge
- Youth CO-OP Program (Bishop Murray)

== Other facilities ==
- St. Patrick School - Previously used as a temporary facility for students during construction of nearby schools, including St. Frances Cree Bilingual School and École St. Matthew School.
- St. James Elementary School, Nutana Park - Closed in 2005 and used by French high school (École canadienne-française) since 2008.
