= Walter Murray Collegiate =

Location
- 1905 Preston Avenue South; Saskatoon, Saskatchewan, S7J 2E7; Canada; 52.1064°N 106.6214°W

Information
- Type: Secondary
- Opened: 1961
- School board: Saskatoon Public Schools
- Principal: David Fisher
- Grades: Grade 9 to Grade 12
- Enrollment: 1,499 (2022)
- Education system: Public
- Language: English, French Immersion
- Colours: Blue and Grey
- Mascot: Haggis
- Team name: Marauders
- Website: Walter Murray Collegiate

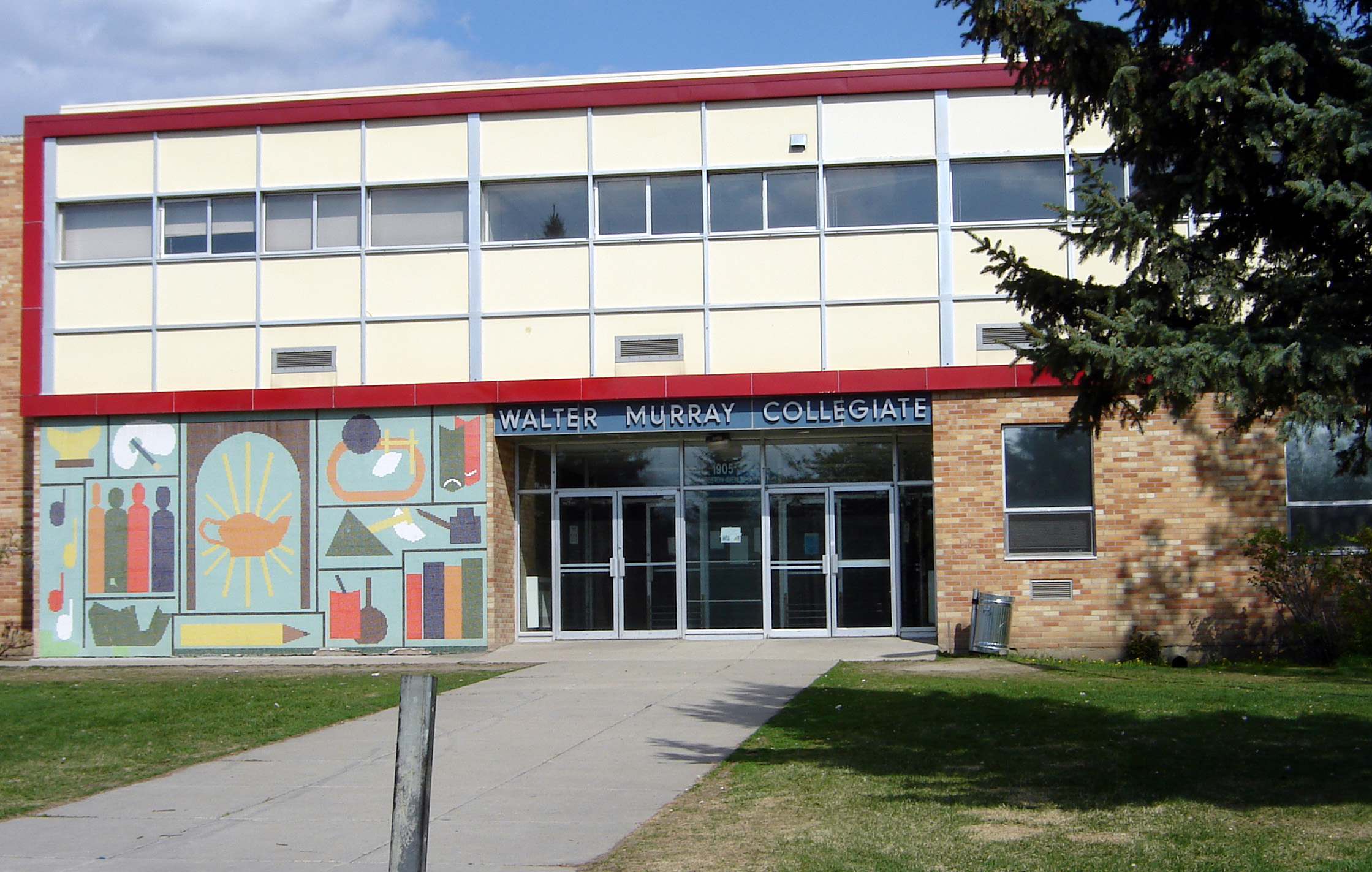

Walter Murray Collegiate, also known as WMCI, is a high school serving grades 9 to 12, located in south-eastern Saskatoon, Saskatchewan. This public secondary school was established in 1961 and is supported by the infrastructure of the Nutana Suburban Centre, a part of the Nutana Suburban Development Area. This school falls under the jurisdiction of the Saskatoon Public School Division.

The school is named after Walter Charles Murray, the first president of the University of Saskatchewan. It is one of two Saskatoon high schools to offer the SAGE program (the other is Bedford Road Collegiate) for gifted students, and one of many with a full French Immersion program. WMCI has a technology wing that offers mechanics, welding, electronics, wood-working, machining, and photography/graphic arts to its students. WMC also offers courses to those learning English as a second language.

As well, Walter Murray offers many successful athletic programs, such as its cross country team, which is a 14 consecutive time defending city championship-winning team, wrestling team, whose girls won cities in 2007 and boys were runners-up, as well as their football program, where Walter Murray had made it to the city final 3 of the past 8 years and their junior football team, who sported the only undefeated record in the city. Recently, they added a hockey program to their list of athletic programs.

Currently its feeder schools are Alvin Buckwold School, Brevoort Park School, Brunskill School, Chief Whitecap School, Colette Bourgonje School, Greystone Heights School, Holliston School, Hugh Cairns, V. C. School, Lakeridge School, Lakeview School, Prince Philip School and Wildwood School.

== Notable alumni ==
- Don Atchison, former mayor of Saskatoon (2003-2016)
- Pat Atkinson, former Saskatchewan MLA
- Ryan Bayda, former NHL player
- Graeme Bell, former CFL player
- Mitch Clarke, former wrestler; professional mixed martial artist in the Ultimate Fighting Championship
- Wendel Clark, former NHL player
- Eric Cline, former Saskatchewan Legislative Assembly member
- Nate Glubish, Alberta Legislative Assembly member
- Mike Green, former NHL player
- Dave King, former Team Canada hockey coach
- Gene Makowsky, former CFL player; Saskatchewan Legislative Assembly member
- Keith Morrison, journalist and broadcaster
