= Collector road =

Roads connecting streets to arterial roads

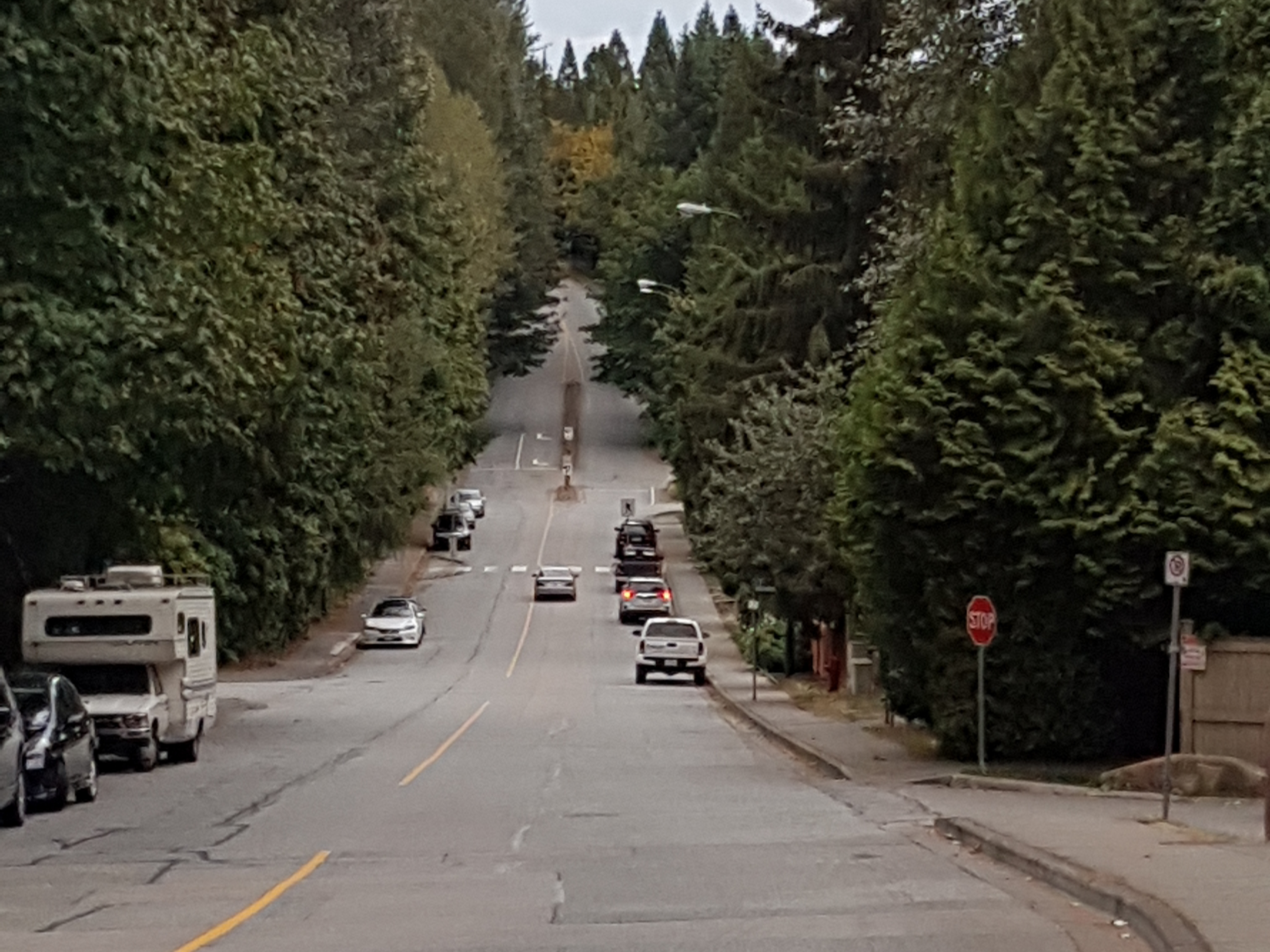
Noons Creek Drive and Falcon Drive are typical collector roads in Port Moody, British Columbia, Canada.

A collector road or distributor road is a low-to-moderate-capacity road which serves to move traffic from local streets to arterial roads. Unlike arterials, collector roads are designed to provide access to residential properties. Rarely, jurisdictions differentiate major and minor collector roads, the former being generally wider and busier.

== Specifications ==
Collector roads can vary widely in appearance. Some urban collectors are wide boulevards entering communities or connecting sections. Others are residential streets, which are typically wider than local roads, although few are wider than four lanes. Small-scale commercial areas can be found on collector roads in residential areas. Key community functions such as schools, churches, and recreational facilities can often be found on collector roads.

A collector road usually consists of a mixture of signaled intersections, roundabouts, traffic circles, or stop signs, often in the form of four-way stops. Two-way stops are generally used at intersections with local streets that favour traffic movement on the collector. In North America, a collector road normally has traffic lights at intersections with arterial roads, whereas roundabouts and two-way stops are more commonly used in Europe.

Speed limits are typically 20‑35 mph (30‑60 km/h) on collector roads in built-up areas, depending on the degree of development and frequency of local access, intersections, and pedestrians, as well as the surrounding area (the speed tends to be lowest in school zones). Traffic calming is occasionally used in older areas on collector roads as well.

== Development ==
Collector roads can originate in several different ways. Most often, they are planned within a suburban layout and built expressly for that purpose; occasionally, they fill gaps in a grid system between arterial roads. Urban planners often consider such roads when laying out new areas of development because infrastructure for utilities such as electric power distribution lines, trunk sewers and water mains can be built through the same corridor.
