= List of neighbourhoods in Saskatoon =

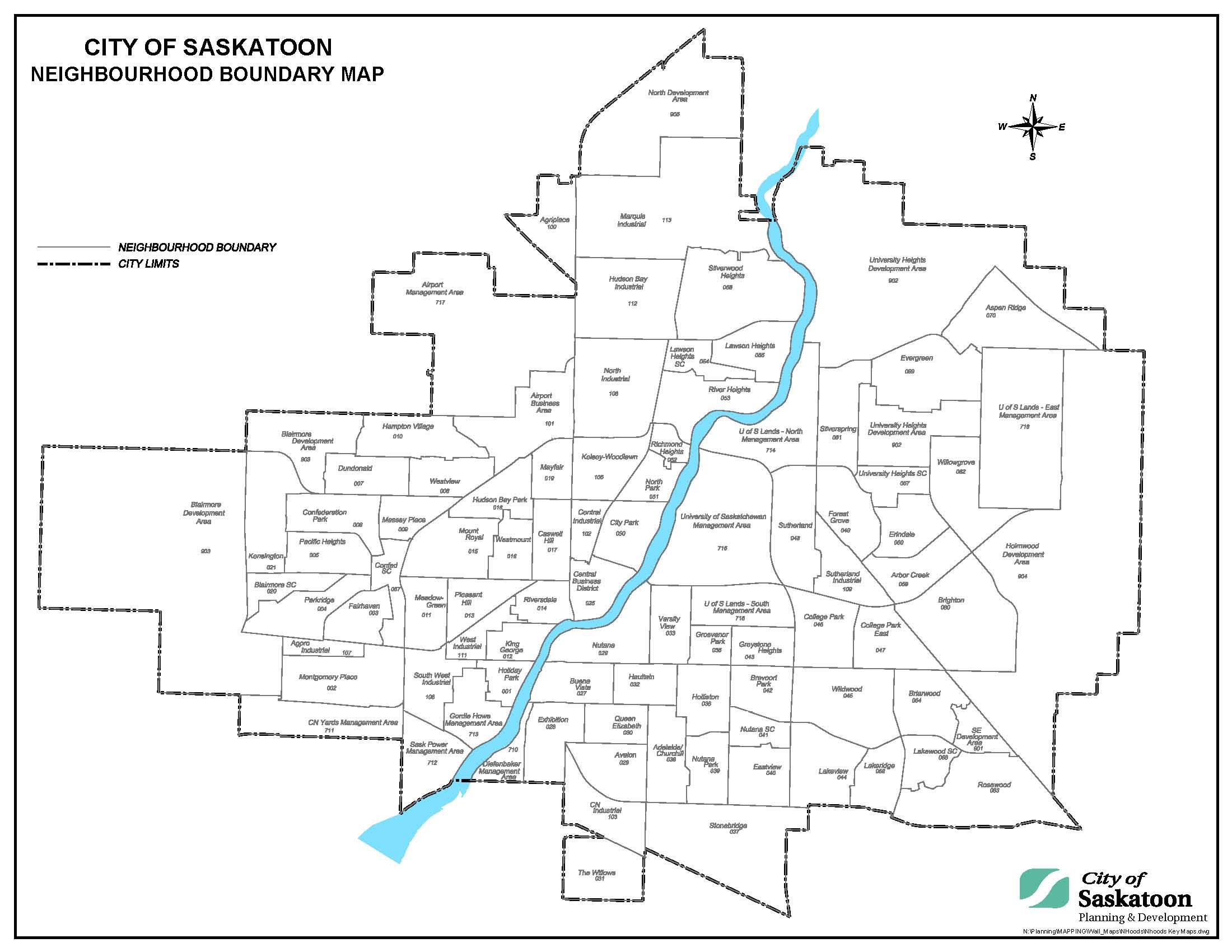
Saskatoon neighbourhood boundaries as of 2014

The city of Saskatoon, Saskatchewan, Canada currently has 65 neighbourhoods divided amongst 9 designated Suburban Development Areas (SDAs). Some neighbourhoods underwent boundary and name changes in the 1990s when the City of Saskatoon adjusted its community map.

== Definitions ==
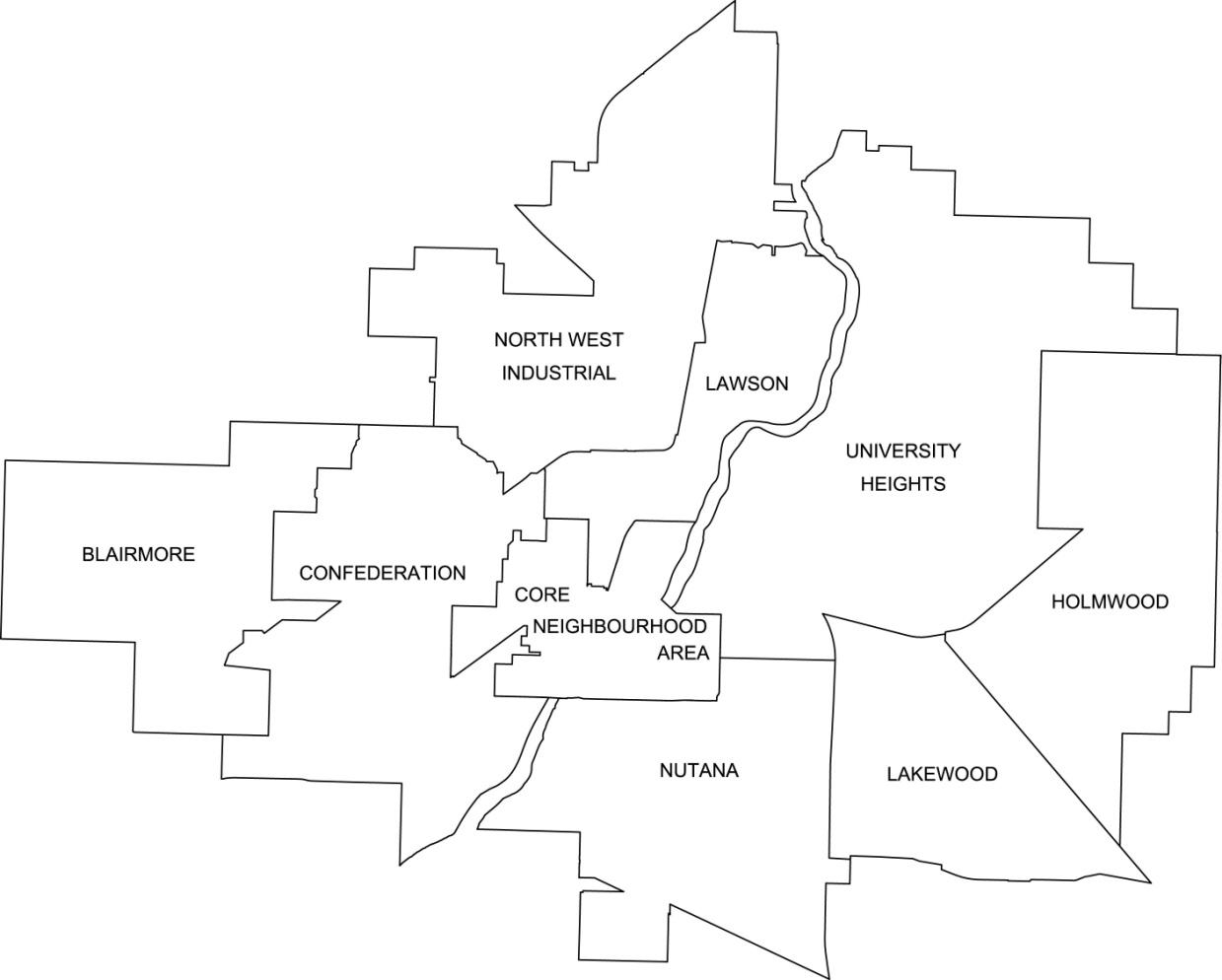
Saskatoon SDA map

- Neighbourhood: the basic unit of residential development, comprehensively planned and maintained over the long term. Many older neighbourhoods were defined by elementary school catchment areas. The boundaries of some neighbourhoods were adjusted when the school boards no longer required students to live in their school catchment area. The boundaries of neighbourhoods are now defined by "natural" barriers such as major streets, railways, and bodies of water.
- Sector: previously Suburban Development Area (SDA), a collection of neighbourhoods organized to facilitate long range planning for infrastructure and related community facilities. Each SDA has approximately ten neighbourhoods, 50,000 people, district and multi-district parks, a mixed-use suburban centre, and high schools.
- Urban Centre (UC): previously Suburban Centre (SC), a neighbourhood that is the primary mixed-use focal point for a suburban development area. They are designed to provide commercial, institutional and recreational lands serving the basic needs of the SDA. Medium to high density residential development is encouraged within SCs and the ones within Saskatoon each include at least one major enclosed or "strip mall" shopping centre.
- Management Area (MA): a term used to classify areas that are generally not covered by residential, industrial or future development characteristics. The main campus of the University of Saskatchewan and surrounding lands is an example.
- Development Area: an area within the city limits that is designated for future neighbourhood development. The term is also applied to remnant land that at the present time is not earmarked for any notable development.

== East ==
=== Core Neighbourhoods Sector ===
- Nutana
- Varsity View

=== Holmwood Sector ===
- Brighton
- U of S Lands - East Management Area
- The City of Saskatoon Project Growth Concept Plan dated June 28, 2012 sketches out 4 additional residential communities, a mixed-use Urban Centre, and a business park/industrial area in this region.

=== Lakewood Sector ===
- Briarwood
- College Park
- College Park East
- Hillcrest Management Area
- Lakeridge
- Lakewood Urban Centre
- Lakeview
- Rosewood
- Wildwood

=== Nutana Sector ===
- Adelaide/Churchill
- Avalon
- Brevoort Park
- Buena Vista
- C.N. Industrial
- Diefenbaker Management Area
- Eastview
- Exhibition
- Greystone Heights
- Grosvenor Park
- Haultain
- Holliston
- Nutana Park
- Nutana Urban Centre
- Queen Elizabeth
- South Development Area
- Stonebridge
- The Willows

=== University Heights Sector ===
- Arbor Creek
- Aspen Ridge
- Erindale
- Evergreen
- Forest Grove
- Silverspring
- Sutherland
- Sutherland Industrial
- University Heights Urban Centre
- Willowgrove
- University of Saskatchewan Management Area
- U of S Lands South Management Area
- U of S Lands North Management Area
- University Heights Development Area
- Two future neighbourhoods are planned

== West ==
=== Blairmore Sector ===
- Blairmore Urban Centre
- Elk Point
- Kensington
- Blairmore Development Area
- C.N. Yards Management Area
- Six additional future neighbourhoods are planned

=== Confederation Sector ===
- AgPro Industrial
- Confederation Park
- Confederation Urban Centre
- Dundonald
- Fairhaven
- Hampton Village
- Holiday Park
- Hudson Bay Park
- Massey Place
- Meadowgreen
- Montgomery Place
- Mount Royal
- Pacific Heights
- Parkridge
- South West Industrial
- West Industrial
- Westview
- Gordie Howe Management Area
- SaskPower Management Area

=== Core Neighbourhoods Sector ===
- Caswell Hill
- City Park
- Downtown
- King George
- Pleasant Hill
- Riversdale
- Westmount

=== Lawson Sector ===
- Central Industrial
- Kelsey-Woodlawn
- Lawson Heights
- Lawson Heights Urban Centre
- Mayfair
- North Park
- Richmond Heights
- River Heights
- Silverwood Heights

=== Riel Industrial Sector ===
- Agriplace
- Airport Business Area
- Hudson Bay Industrial
- Marquis Industrial
- North Industrial
- Airport Management Area
