= History of Saskatoon =

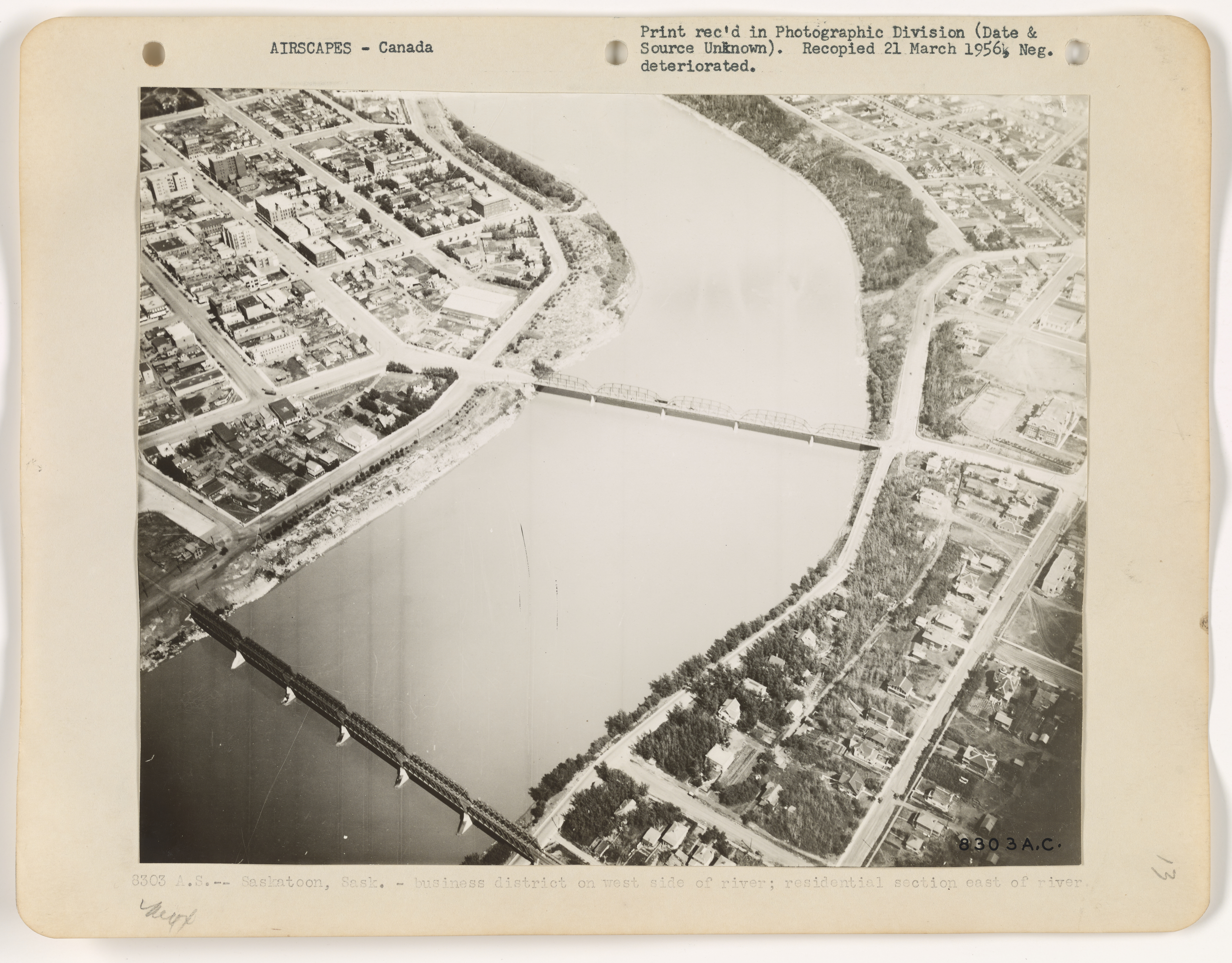
Aerial photo of the South Saskatchewan River, c. 1940s. The city of Saskatoon developed around the South Saskatchewan River.

The history of Saskatoon began with the first permanent non-indigenous settlement of Saskatoon, Saskatchewan, Canada, in 1883 when Toronto Methodists, wanting to escape the liquor trade in that city, decided to set up a "dry" community in the rapidly growing prairie region. As of 1882, this area was a part of the provisional district named Saskatchewan, North-West Territories (NWT). Their organization, the Temperance Colonization Society, first examined this area in 1882 and found that it would make an excellent location to found their community based on the ideals of the temperance movement; Saskatoon traditionally considers 1882 its founding year and thus marked its centennial in 1982. The settlers, led by John Neilson Lake, arrived on the site of what is now Saskatoon by traveling by railway from Ontario to Moose Jaw, Assiniboia, NWT, and then completing the final leg via horse-drawn cart (the railway had yet to be completed to Saskatoon). The plan for the Temperance Colony soon failed as the group was unable to obtain a large block of land within the community. Nonetheless, John Lake is commonly identified as the founder of Saskatoon; a public school, a park and two streets are named after him (Lake Crescent, which was developed in the 1960s, and Eastlake Avenue, originally Lake Avenue (as testified on the first map of Saskatoon from 1883), but later changed for reasons unknown).

In 1885, several houses on 11th Street East were used as military hospitals during the North-West Rebellion. One house, the Marr Residence, is a heritage site run by the Meewasin Valley Authority. The first school, Victoria School, opened for classes at the corner of 11th Street and Broadway Avenue in 1888. This small school, now called the "Little Stone Schoolhouse", now sits on the campus of the University of Saskatchewan.

== Early history ==
Before the founding of the city itself, the Saskatoon area was already inhabited by nomadic indigenous peoples, with the oldest traces of occupation dating back around 6,000 years. Stratified remains from the Tipperary Creek First Nations sites near Saskatoon indicate that the area was occupied by indigenous peoples in winter. The future site of Saskatoon was part of the lands that First Nations ceded to the Crown by Treaty 6 in 1876.

The Qu'Appelle, Long Lake and Saskatchewan Railway reached Saskatoon in 1890 and crossed the South Saskatchewan River where the Senator Sid Buckwold Bridge now stands, causing a boom in development on the west side of the river.

== 20th century ==
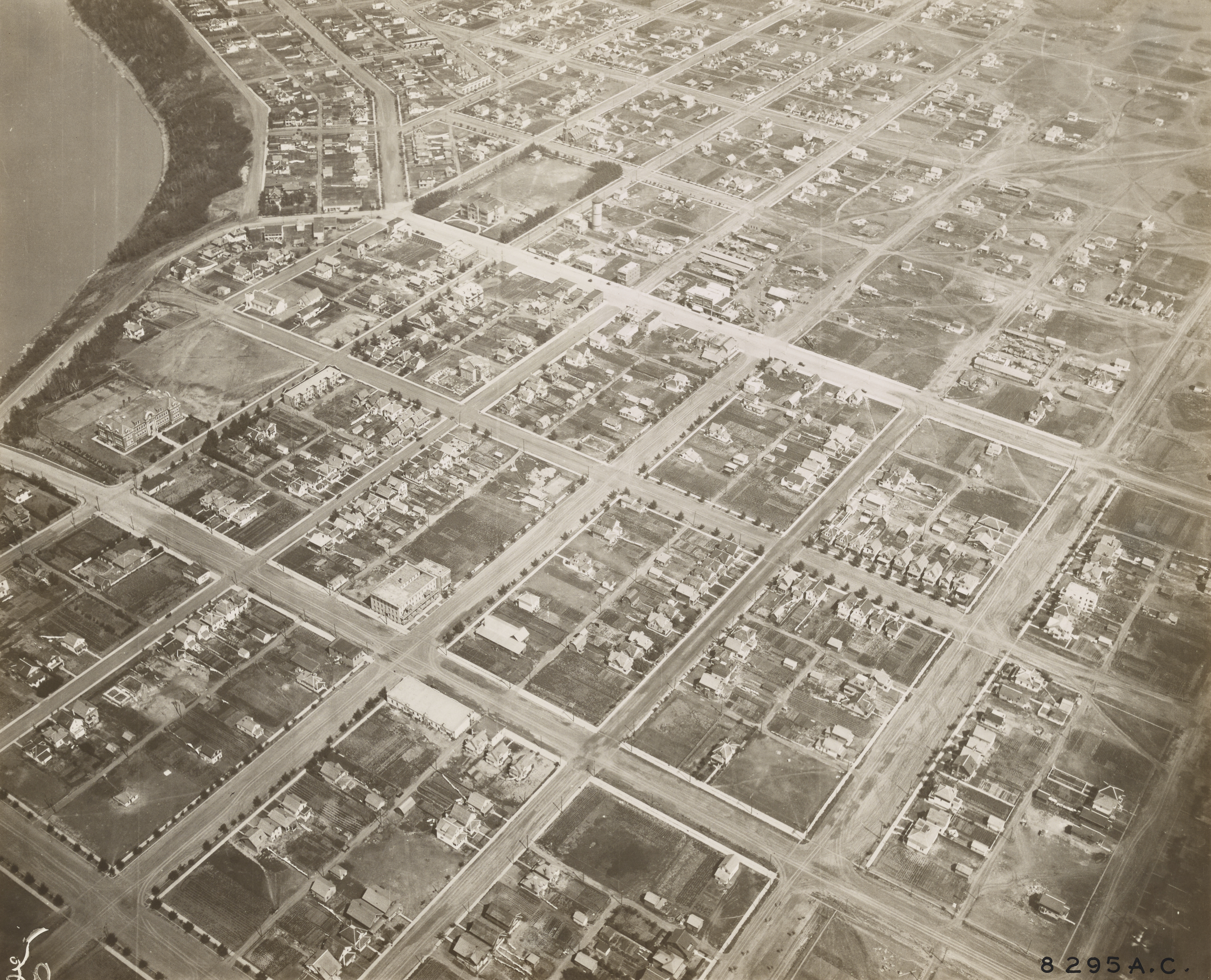
East of the river, 1920

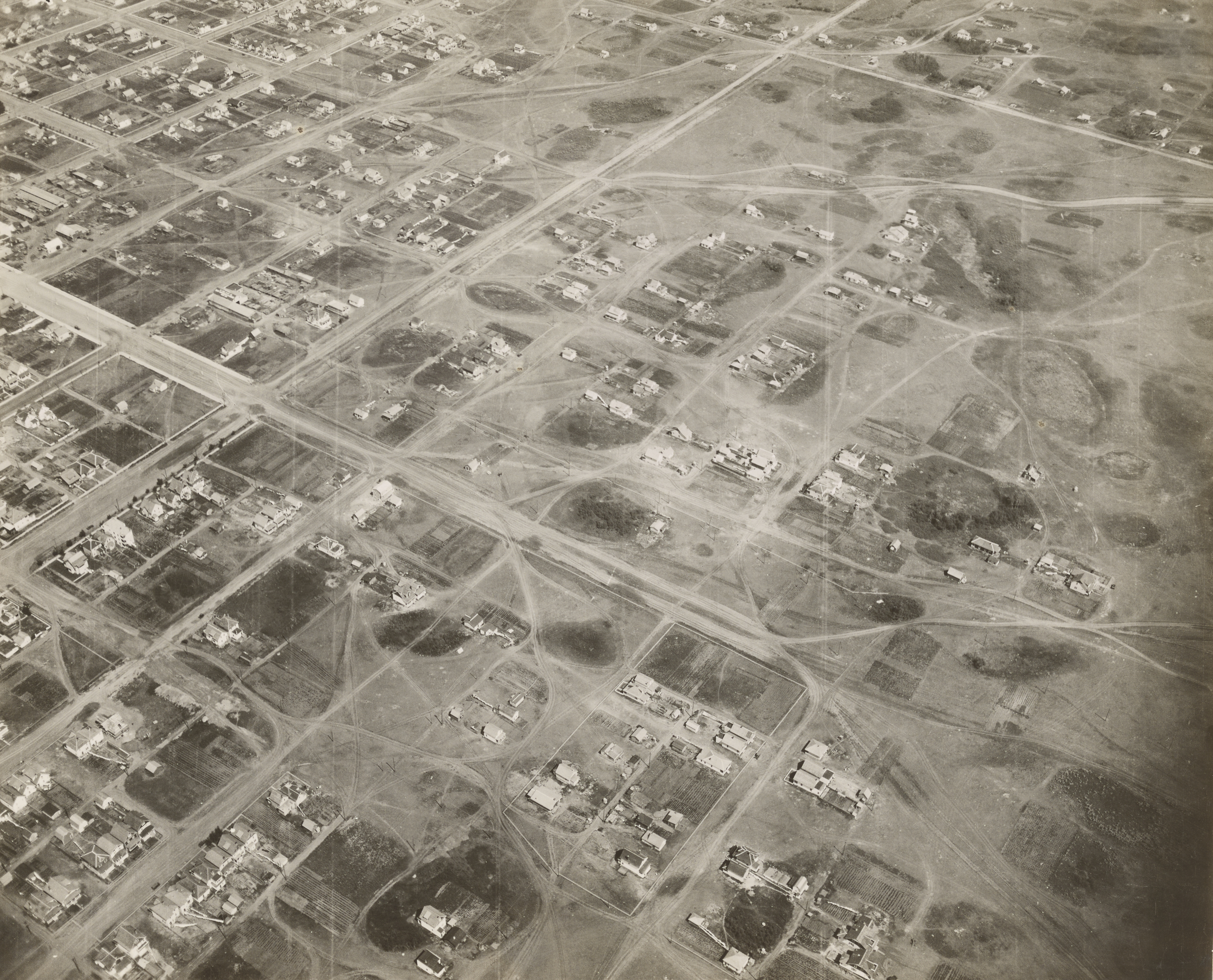
Outskirts of the city, 1920

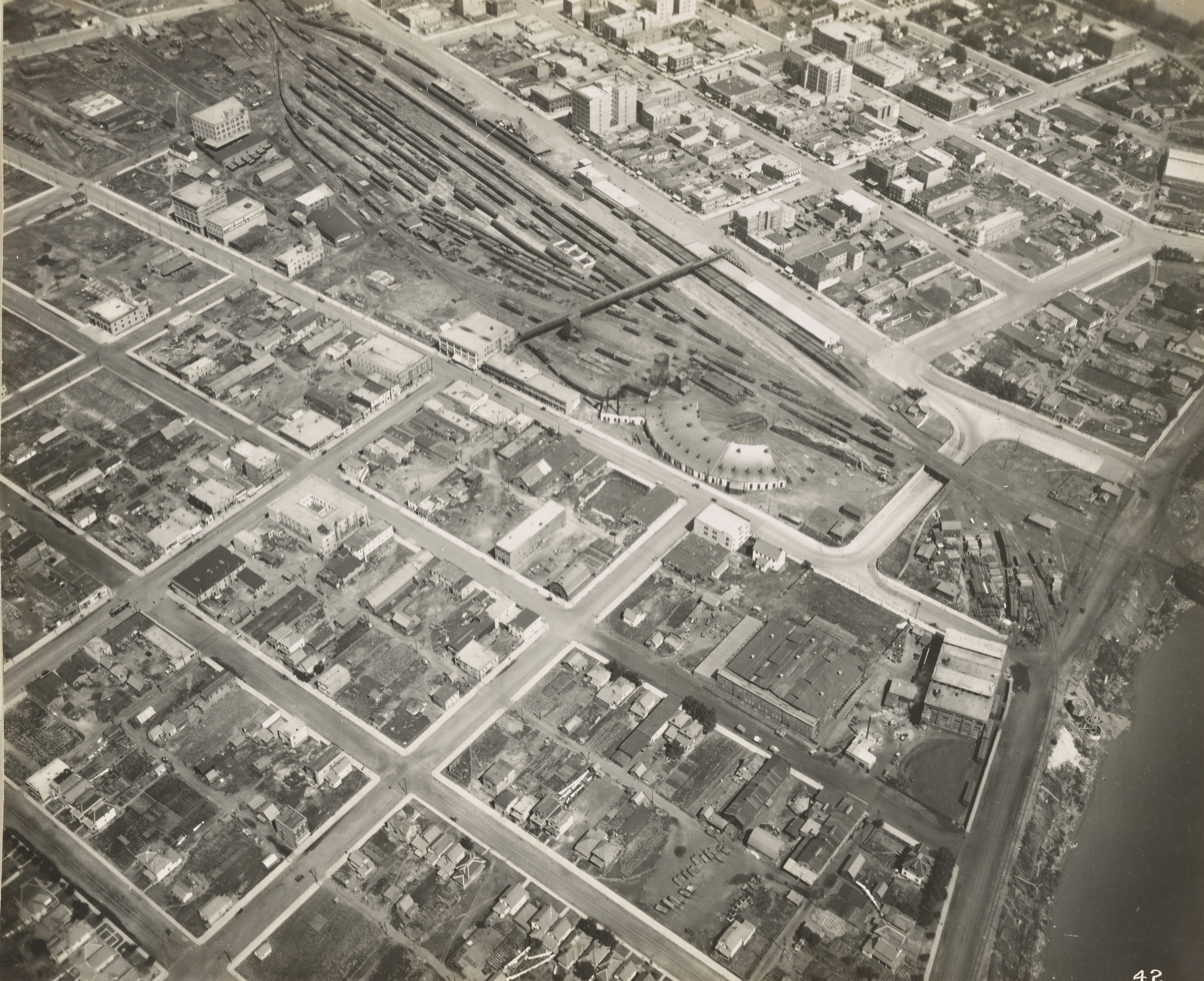
Rail yards, 1920

From the end of the North-West Rebellion in 1895 to 1913, Saskatoon was a "boom town" that saw large population growth. The main contributing factors of the growth include the establishment of a temperance settlement in the area during the late 19th century, an economic surge created by the Barr colonists 1903, the city becoming a railway network hub, and the establishment of the University of Saskatchewan in the city.

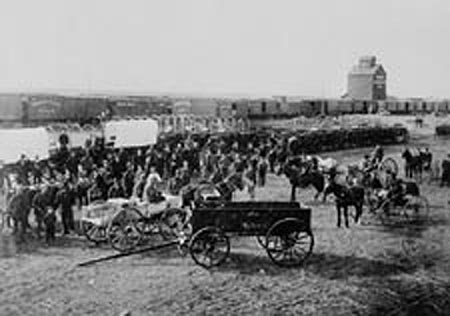
Barr Colonists in Saskatoon in 1903. The settlement of Saskatoon saw an economic boom when the Barr colonists encamped in the city.

In 1901, Saskatoon's population hit 113. A third settlement, Riversdale, also began just southwest of Saskatoon. 1903 saw an economic boom for Saskatoon with the encampment of Barr colonists on their way to the Brittania colony. A town charter for the west side of the river was obtained in 1903; Nutana became a village in the same year.

April 1904 saw the collapse of the railway bridge due to spring melt and ice on the South Saskatchewan River. The Grand Trunk Pacific Railway system survey proposed Hanley as its northern terminal between Regina and Prince Albert. Saskatoon's Board of Trade sent delegates from Saskatoon to Ottawa to discuss the river crossing and proposed city bridges. Their mission resulted in the selection of Saskatoon as the divisional centre for both the Canadian Pacific Railway and the Grand Trunk Pacific Railway; both of these built bridges near the town by 1907. The Qu'Appelle, Long Lake and Saskatchewan railway bridge was rebuilt in 1905 and again after a train fell through it on March 4, 1912. The bridge was demolished in 1964 to make way for the Senator Sid Buckwold Bridge and the Idylwyld Freeway.

In 1906, Saskatoon became a city with a population of 4,500, which included the communities of Saskatoon, Riversdale, and Nutana.

Following the formation of the Province of Saskatchewan September 1, 1905, Premier Walter Scott focused on the creation of a provincial university and agricultural college. Moose Jaw, Prince Albert, Saskatoon, Regina, Qu'Appelle, Indian Head, and Battleford were all under consideration for this location. President Walter Murray and the Board of University Governors voted in favour of Saskatoon on April 7, 1907.

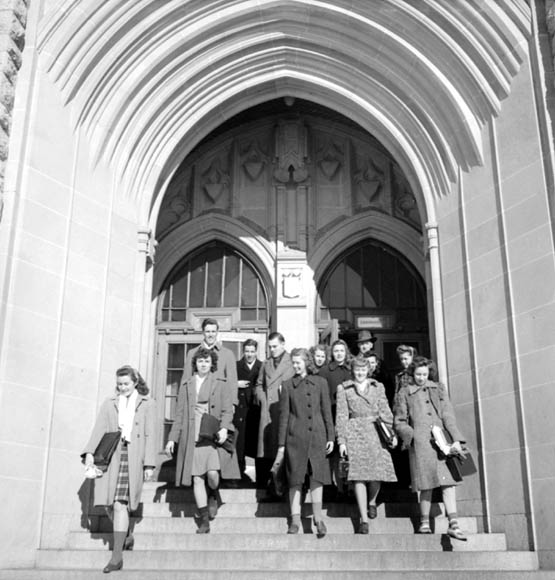
Students of the University of Saskatchewan exit the chemistry building, 1944. The university was established in Saskatoon in 1907.

1907 saw the completion of the Traffic Bridge, as well as the CPR Bridge and Grand Trunk Pacific GTP Railway Bridge. The geographical barrier: South Saskatchewan River between Nutana and West Saskatoon was overcome with the building of the Traffic Bridge, which opened in 1907. The physical barrier of the CNR rail yards isolated Riversdale and Saskatoon. Road underpasses below the railway were built at 19th and 23rd Streets, and a wooden pedestrian overpass at 20th Street.

From 1920 to 1926 and from 1938 to 1942, Saskatoon used single transferable vote (STV), a form of proportional representation, to elect its councillors. Councillors were elected in one at-large district. Each voter cast just a single vote, using a ranked transferable ballot.

=== Latter 20th century ===
After the First World War, the Dirty Thirties and Depression years saw migration away from bankrupt farms and towards a hope of employment in the cities. The socio-economic changes brought about by the Second World War and the industrial revolution saw a shift from rural life to urban living. Saskatoon was not only a centre for the British Commonwealth Air Training Plan during the 1940s, but also became a major regional distribution and service centre. Saskatoon experienced a severe shortage of residential dwellings between 1945 and 1960.

During the 1960s, the CN railway yards were relocated to Chappell Drive, making room for the Idylwyld Freeway and Midtown Plaza in the first Saskatoon Downtown revitalisation project.

In 1906, the boundaries of Saskatoon were Clarence Avenue to the east, Taylor Street to the south, Avenue P to the west, and 33rd Street East to the north. This area is roughly the same as the core neighborhood suburban development area. These boundaries remained basically the same for approximately 40 years until Saskatoon reached financial stability during World War II.

The following suburban development areas saw neighbourhoods developed between 1940 and 1980: Nutana SDA on the east side; on the west side Confederation SDA and Lawson SDA.

In 1955, Montgomery Place and in 1956 the neighbouring town of Sutherland were annexed by the quickly growing City of Saskatoon This growth continued until the mid-1980s.

In 1992, Bret Hart defeated Ric Flair for the WWE Championship in Saskatoon’s Saskatchewan Place.

Technological, educational and cultural amenities also expanded to meet the increased demand in this growing city.

== 21st century ==
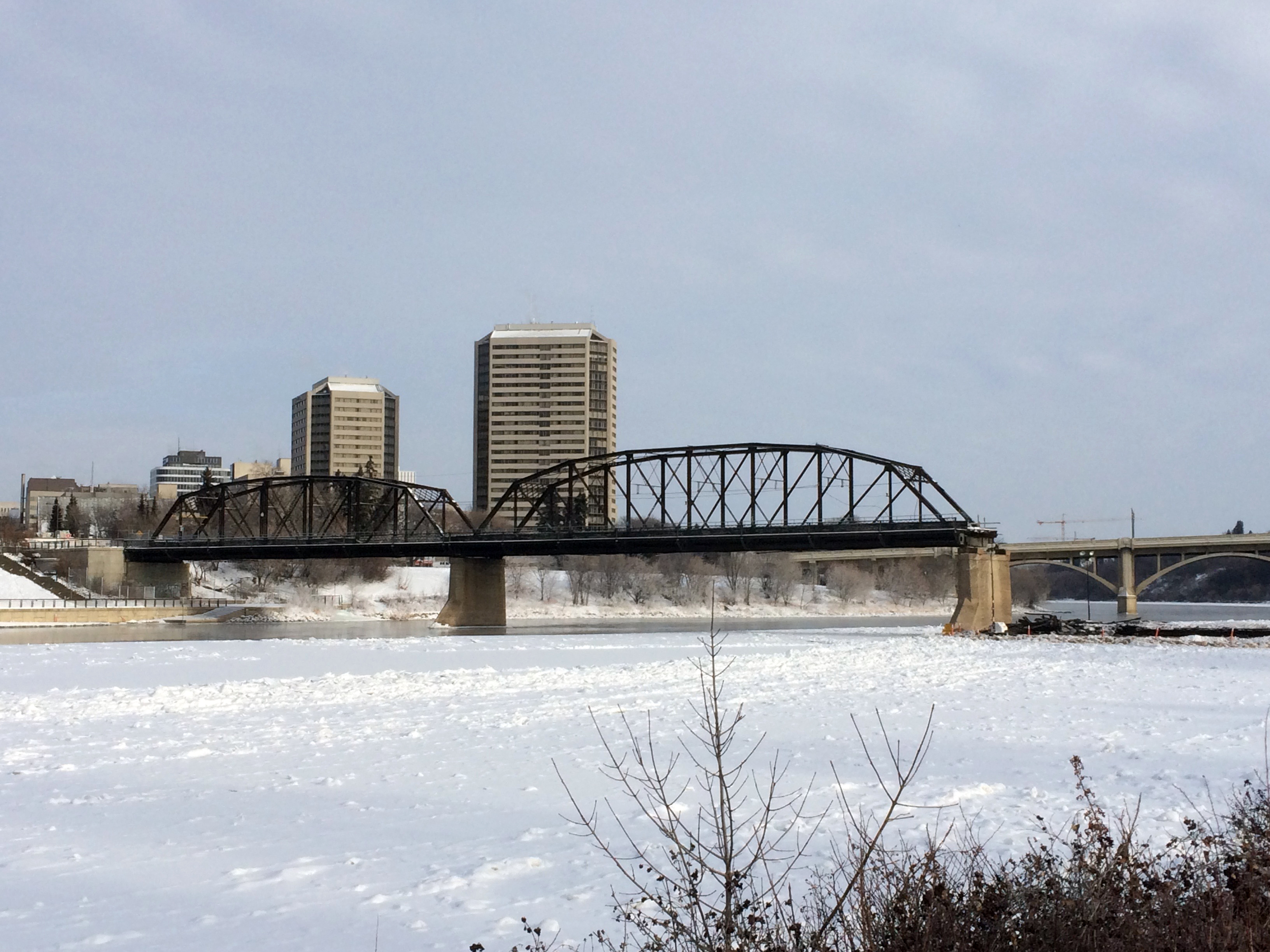
Partially demolished Traffic Bridge in 2016, once a symbol of the merger of Saskatoon, Nutana and Riversdale. Its replacement was approved in 2011.

Saskatoon's first growth spurt gained Saskatoon the nickname Hub City, whereas the latest growth phenomenon has been termed Sask-a-boom. The 10-year capital deficiency discussion paper for 2007–2016 has recently been updated for 2007. The new priority for the civic government are infrastructure needs and proposed new capital projects for the population increases and for the physical geographical growth.

The phenomenal retail sector increase, new neighborhoods and communities place a demand upon the city to provide additional firehalls, transit buses, police headquarters, libraries, water plants, electrical power plants, bridges, interchanges and roadways. Brookside, Rosewood, Stonebridge, The Willows, Willowgrove, University Heights Suburban Centre, Hampton Village, Hudson Bay Industrial, Marquis Industrial, Blairmore Suburban Centre, and another 10 unnamed proposed neighborhoods are being developed or are currently under construction.

A further annexation of extensive areas to the north, northeast and east of the city took place in July 2010.

On August 24, 2010, the Traffic Bridge, which symbolized the uniting of Saskatoon, Nutana and Riversdale into one city, was closed indefinitely due to structural integrity concerns were raised. In 2011, the city council decided to replace the iconic bridge, which was completed and opened to the public on October 3, 2018.

== Historical communities amalgamated into Saskatoon ==
Annexation of Saskatoon Neighbourhoods by year, 1911–2005
1911	Adelaide; Avalon; Exhibition	Grosvenor Park; Holliston; Mayfair	Mount Royal; East North Park; Nutana Park; Pleasant Hill; Varsity View; Westview
1955–59	Brevoort Park; College Park; Eastview; Forest Grove	Greystone Heights; Hudson Bay Industrial; Meadow Green	Montgomery Place; Mount Royal West; Richmond Heights River Heights 1 Silverspring; South West Industrial; Sutherland; U of S
1960–64	C.N. Industrial 1 Massey Place	Confederation Suburban Ctr. Westview	Fairhaven
1965–69	Airport Industrial	C.N. Industrial 2	South Nutana Park
1970–74	Airport Confederation; East College Park	Fairhaven Pacific Heights; River Heights 2	Wildwood
1975–79	Briarwood Dundonald; Hampton Village	Hudson Bay Ind. Lakeridge; Lakeview	Lawson Heights Marquis Industrial; Parkridge; Silverwood Heights; Wildwood; Willowgrove; University Heights S.C.
1980–84	Agriplace Arbor Creek; Briarwood	Erindale Marquis Industrial; Montgomery Extension	Willowgrove Lakewood SDA (Rosewood)
1985–89	Stonebridge		
1990–94	Marquis Industrial		
2000–04	Hampton Village	Willows	University Heights SDA
2005	Blairmore	Marquis Industrial (Akzo)	

Saskatoon became a city with the amalgamation with the above three communities, however the current size of Saskatoon has meant that the geographical presence of Saskatoon has encompassed several other early communities.

- North Saskatoon is now known as North Park.
- West Saskatoon was a post office from 1900, which changed its name to Saskatoon in 1902. This area is currently referred to as the Central Business District.
- Chappell was a CNR station west of Saskatoon, located near the present-day location of Montgomery Place.
- There was also a community known as Brownell near North Saskatoon; it was located near present-day 51st Street and Miners Avenue, in the present-day neighborhood of Hudson Bay Industrial.
- McNab Park was built 1967 as a Royal Canadian Air Force station and is located in the Airport Business Area. It has been used as a low-income housing development for many years. The community was decommissioned and dismantled in 2011–2012 and is being redeveloped as a business park.
- The "Magic City" of Factoria is now the neighborhood of Silverwood Heights. Billy Silverwood, a horse breeder and spring water bottler, owned land 2 miles (3 km) north of the 1912 Saskatoon city limits. The enterprises of horse breeding and bottling water, where an uncontaminated water supply was needed, were not a good combination. R.E. Glass, a Chicago entrepreneur, had a vision of an industrial community and purchased the Silverwood Bottling Company. He foresaw extending the rail line to service factories, breweries, flour mills, and expanded bottling works. The rail line came in 1913, and the beginnings of businesses lined the track, however World War I and the coming of electricity in 1918 made the venture unsuccessful.
- Caswell Hill was a hill located in the homestead of Robert Caswell; it was developed as Saskatoon's first suburb and is prominent in early photographs of the west side of Saskatoon.
- Crescent Heights was a proposed subdivision from 1912. It would have been located five miles (8 km) from the Saskatoon city limits, at the location of Battleford Trail Road, which remains outside the city limits to this day.
- West of Saskatoon were a number of CNR and CPR stations closely spaced together along their parallel tracks. The closest was Yorath, on the CNR line just west of the river, near Yorath Island and approximately where the landfill is located today. Garfield was the closest CPR station, approximately where the present-day neighbourhoods of Fairhaven, Saskatoon and Parkridge, Saskatoon are located. About three miles (5 km) farther out were Cory (CPR), Farley (CNR), and Eaton (CNR branch line toward Vanscoy), in approximately a north-south line; Eaton was renamed Hawker, as the post office was confused with Eatonia, and is now the location of the Saskatchewan Railway Museum. Eaton was also used briefly as a Ukrainian Canadian internment during World War I.
- Smithville Cemetery is just west of Saskatoon on Highway 14 just west of the city, although it is now within the city limits.
- East of Saskatoon, Newcross (north of Grasswood, earlier called South Saskatoon) and Duro were CNR stations between Saskatoon and Clavet, while Engen and Floral were east of Saskatoon on the CPR line.
- In 1904, the Grand Trunk Railway GTR built a station named Earl 3 three miles (5 km) south of the boundaries of Saskatoon at that time. This is presently the CN Industrial area.

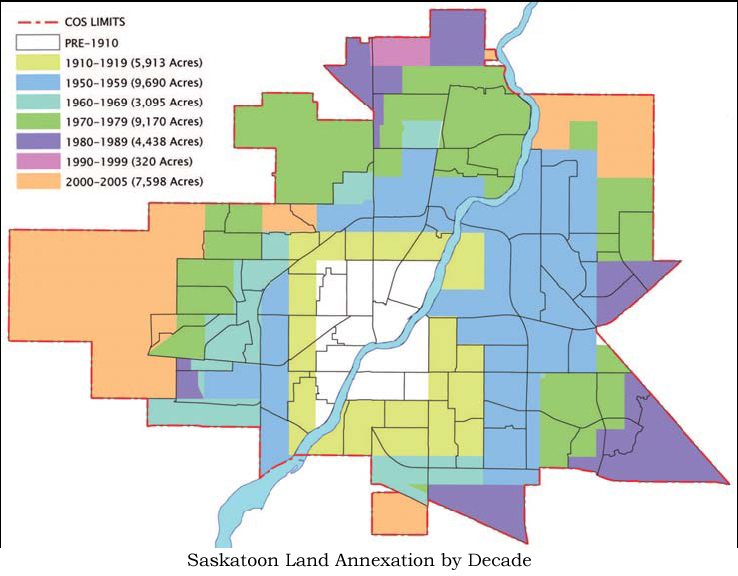
Saskatoon's land annexation by decade

=== Legal land location of amalgamated communities ===
Location name	Section	Township	Range west of Third Meridian	Notes
Haultain	36	34	5	1916 post office
Smithville	NE 28	36	6	
Garfield		38	7	
Diova S.D.		36	7	
Diova P.O.	24	36	8	
Grandora S.D.		36	8	
Grandora P.O.	19	36	8	
Brownell	SE 16	37	5	
West Saskatoon	28	36	5	
Sutherland	35	36	5	
Nutana	28	36	5	
Beckett	25	37	7	
Hawoods	20	36	8	
Dunfermline	35	36	8	
Little Stone S.D.	33	35	5	
Nutana S.D.		37	5	
Montgomery Place S.D.		36	6	
Gardenvilla S.D.	NE 13	37	5	

Currently Saskatoon is considered to be located encompassing townships 36 and 37, range 5 and township 36, range 6, west of the Third Meridian. (See also Dominion Land Survey – Each township is a 6-mile (10 km) square.)

== Historical population ==
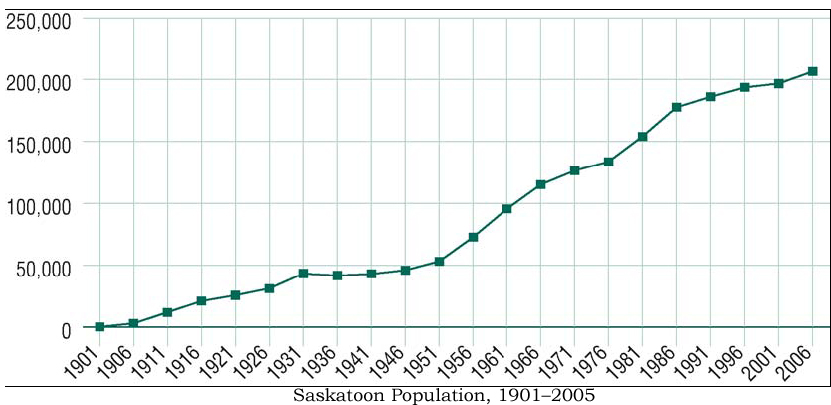
Saskatoon's population growth from 1901 to 2006. The city saw significant growth post-World War II, leading to a shortage of residential dwellings from 1945 to 1960.

Rate of population change
1901–2016
Census year	Population	Population change	5-year change
1901	311		
1906	3,011	2,700	868%
1911	12,004	8,993	299%
1916	21,054	9,050	75%
1921	25,739	4,685	22%
1926	31,234	5,495	21%
1931	43,291	12,057	39%
1936	41,734	(1,557)	−4%
1941	43,027	1,293	3%
1946	46,028	3,001	7%
1951	53,268	7,240	16%
1956	72,858	19,590	37%
1961	95,526	22,668	31%
1966	115,247	19,721	21%
1971	126,450	11,203	10%
1976	133,750	7,300	6%
1981	154,210	20,460	15%
1986	177,641	23,431	15%
1991	186,058	8,417	4.74%
1996	193,647	7,589	4%
2001	196,811	3,164	2%
2006*	206,500	9,689	5%
2011*	222,245	15,745	7.6%
2016*	246,376	34,131	10.9%
*These numbers are retrieved from their respective censuses.
