= Riel Industrial Sector =

- Sector
- Interactive map of Riel Industrial Sector
- Coordinates: 52°09′58″N 106°39′16″W
- Country: Canada
- Province: Saskatchewan
- City: Saskatoon

Area
  - Total: 19.84 km^{2} (7.66 sq mi)
- Area code: 306

Riel Industrial Sector, formerly known as North Industrial Sector or North Industrial Suburban Development Area (SDA), is located in the city of Saskatoon, Saskatchewan, Canada. It lies generally on the northern outskirts of Saskatoon, west of Lawson Sector, north of the Confederation Sector, and borders the Rural Municipality of Corman Park No. 344. Previously known as the North Industrial Sector, was renamed the Riel Industrial Sector on January 25, 2016.

== Layout ==
For zoning purposes there are four major types of zoning in the Riel Industrial Sector. There are light industrial areas which have economic business activity which do not interfere with neighborhood community interests, and are therefore zoned IL1 districts. Heavy Industrial areas are also in this area which show industrial economic concern which may create nuisance activities during their operating day. These zones are IH areas.a A business park meets business environment concerns. As well there are environmental industrial park zoning which ensures safe processing of environmentally hazardous products. These four main zoning areas receive further designated zoning from the City of Saskatoon.

- IL1-General Light Industrial District proposed development above.
- IL2-Limited Intensity Light Industrial District no conflict from the industry's processes to environment or neighbors.
- IL3-Limited Intensity Light Industrial District industry does not affect surroundings, but may need to create buffer zones to achieve this affect.
- IB-Industrial Business District plans to combine industry and business.
- IH-Heavy Industrial District
- AM-Auto Mall District serves customers to sell and service vehicles.
- Holding Symbol ‘H’ land parcel with uncertain development.
- RA1-Reinvestment Area District effectively re-vitalizes a deteriorating area.
- DM3-Saskatoon Planning District Zoning (Industrial 3 District) the transition stage wherein a rural area recently becomes an urban area, and zoning must complement both rural and urban planning.

The Riel Industrial Sector is 3,349.7 acres (13.556 km^{2}) in size with a density of 63%. The Riel Industrial Sector combines industrial and commercial land. There is still one large livestock operation within the SDA region. There is also a residential area remaining which is McNab Park the old RCAF housing. Larkhaven industrial is located in the area of the Saskatoon Inn.

== Subdivisions ==
There are five industrial areas located in the North Industrial Suburban Development Area (SDA) which are:

- Agriplace
- Airport Business Area
- Hudson Bay Industrial
- Marquis Industrial
- North Industrial
- North Development Area
- North West Development Area

The other seven industrial areas of Saskatoon, located outside the Riel SDA, are AgPro Industrial, West Industrial, and Southwest Industrial (Confederation Sector), Central Industrial and Kelsey-Woodlawn (Lawson Sector), C.N. Industrial (Nutana Sector), and Sutherland Industrial (University Heights Sector).

== Transportation ==
The Riel Industrial Sector is served by air for imports and exports to the industrial area by the Access to the Industrial SDA is achieved by Saskatoon Transit bus routes to the area which are the 11 Airport – Exhibition and the 14 North Industrial – City Centre. Access is also provided to the Riel Industrial Sector by Circle Drive and Idylwyld Drive, which are concurrent to Highway 16 (itself part of the Trans-Canada Highway and Yellowhead Highway) and Highway 11 (Louis Riel Trail) which connects Saskatoon to Regina and Prince Albert, and Highway 12. It also connects Saskatoon with the bedroom communities of Warman and Martensville. The CNR rail line runs in a north-south direction on the east perimeter of the Riel Industrial Sector and the area is serviced by spur lines.

== Development ==
There are plans to revamp the Riel Industrial Sector which include changing Airport Drive format to a “Gateway to Saskatoon”. To introduce Larkhaven Park formation as a park space. There is a process to phase out residential communities for example at McNab Park and re-vamp the area to light industrial and business park uses. There are approximately 600 people living in the Airport Business Area in 163 dwellings. This area was formerly known as R.C.A.F. McNab Park. There are about 352 businesses in the Airport Business Area. There are also future plans to develop the area west of Airport Drive and North west of Circle Drive.

== Recreation facilities ==
Another feature of industrial areas are recreational facilities. In the Riel Industrial Sector are the Canlan Ice Sports – Agriplace as well as the SaskTel Centre. The SaskTel Centre hosts concerts, Blades hockey games and Draggins Rod and Custom Show
