= Lakewood Urban Centre, Saskatoon =

Lakewood Urban Centre
- Neighbourhood
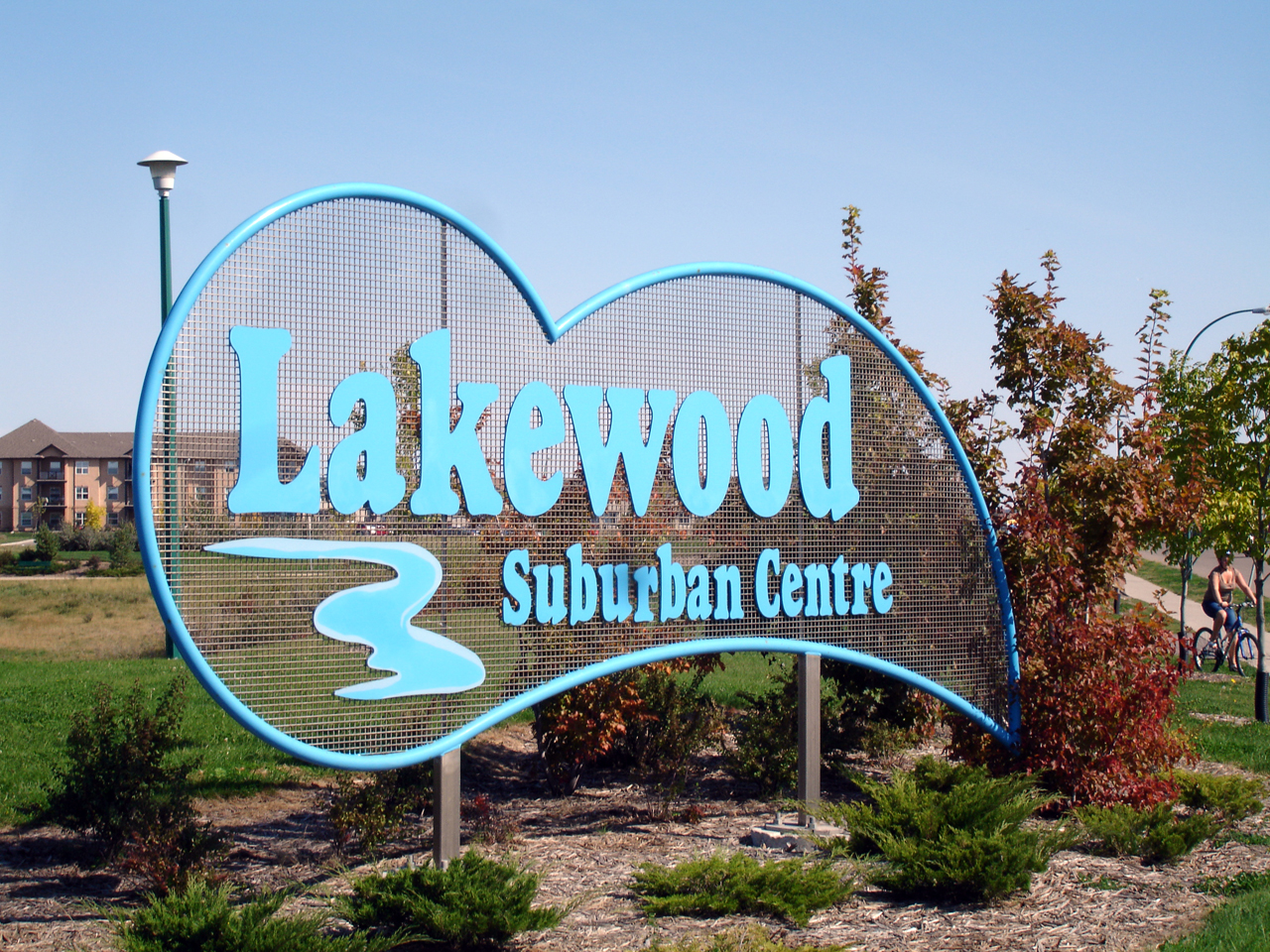
- Lakewood Urban Centre entrance sign, using the former name of Lakewood Suburban Centre.

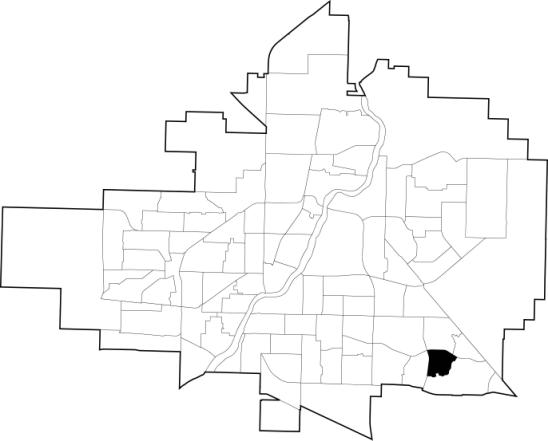
- Lakewood Urban Centre location map
- Coordinates: 52°5′53″N 106°34′0″W
- Country: Canada
- Province: Saskatchewan
- City: Saskatoon
- Sector: Lakewood
- Annexed: 1975-1984
- Construction: 2001-present

Government
  - Type: Municipal (Ward 9)
  - Administrative body: Saskatoon City Council
  - Councillor: Bev Dubois

Area
  - Total: 0.93 km^{2} (0.36 sq mi)

Population (2011)
  - Total: 1,850
  - Average Income: $65,927
- Time zone: UTC-6 (UTC)

Lakewood Urban Centre, previously known as Lakewood Suburban Centre, is a mixed-development neighbourhood located in southeast Saskatoon, Saskatchewan, Canada. It is a classified as a "suburban centre" subdivision, composed of mostly medium to high-density multiple-unit dwellings, commercial areas and civic facilities. As of 2011, the area is home to 1,850 residents. The neighbourhood is considered a middle-income area, with an average family income of $65,927, an average dwelling value of $227,522 and a home ownership rate of 76.8%.

== History ==
The land for the Lakewood Urban Centre was annexed between 1975 and 1984. Residential construction began in 2003 after infrastructure had been completed. The housing stock is composed entirely of low-rise apartment style condominiums and townhouses. City council approved architectural controls for some of Lakewood SC's development in 2006. All the lots in the neighbourhood have been purchased, so development will continue until full build-out is achieved.

When Lakewood Suburban Centre first appeared on city maps in the 1980s it had different boundaries further to the west, encompassing the Heritage subdivision, including the area recreation centre and library, as well as the Wildwood Golf Course. In the 1990s, the City of Saskatoon revised its community boundaries, extending the boundary of the Wildwood neighbourhood east to Boychuk Drive, encompassing the land previously defined as being the Lakewood Suburban Centre. Lakewood Suburban Centre was subsequently redefined as the region to the southeast of Boychuk Drive and Taylor Street. In the 2010s the neighbourhood was renamed from Lakewood Suburban Centre to Lakewood Urban Centre, along with the city's other suburban centres.

== Government and politics ==
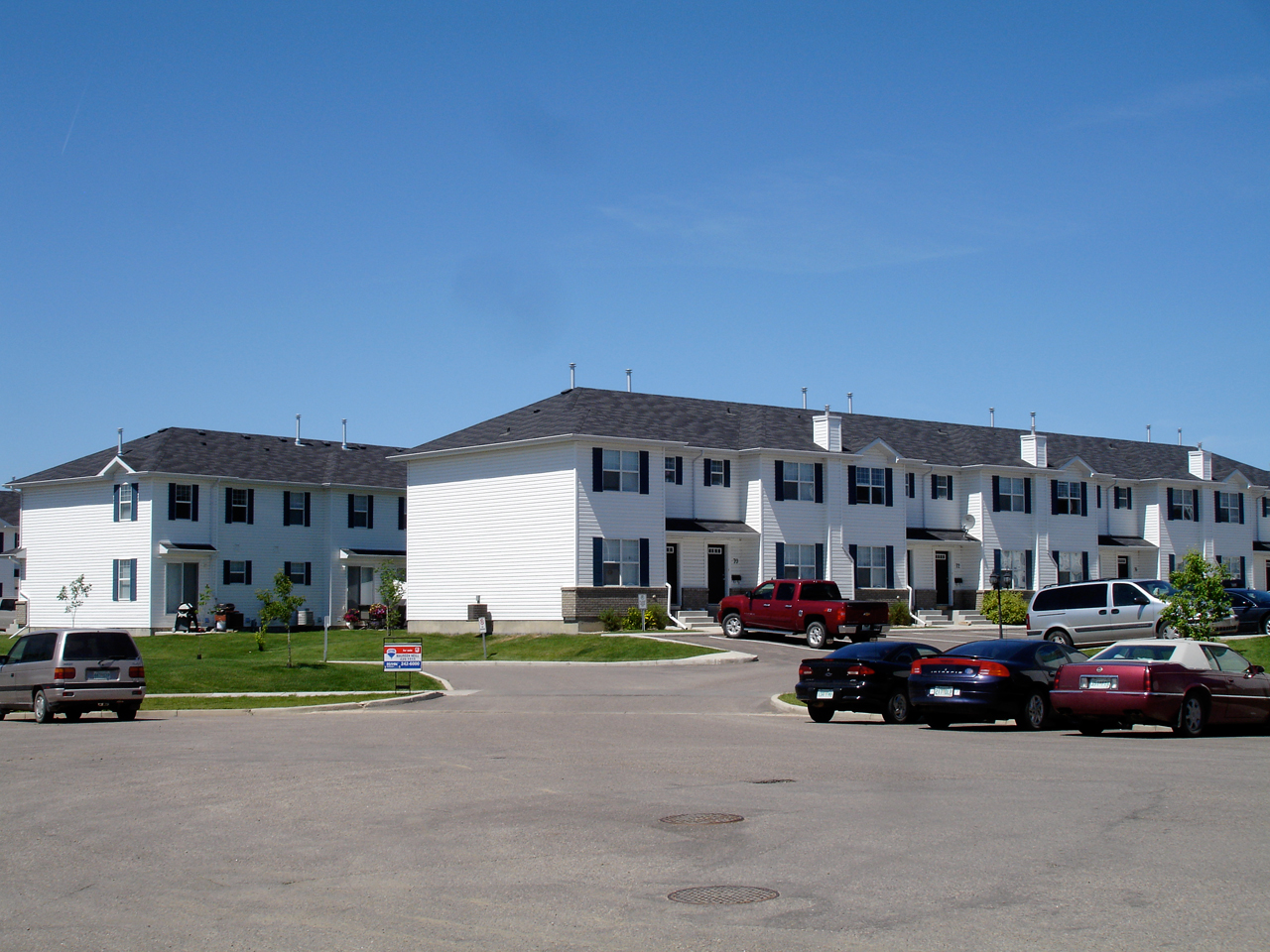
Condos in Lakewood SC

Lakewood Urban Centre exists within the federal electoral district of Saskatoon—Grasswood. It is currently represented by Kevin Waugh of the Conservative Party of Canada, first elected in 2015.

Provincially, the area is within the constituency of Saskatoon Southeast. It is currently represented by Don Morgan of the Saskatchewan Party, first elected in 2003 and re-elected in 2007, 2011 and 2016.

In Saskatoon's non-partisan municipal politics, Lakewood Urban Centre lies within ward 9. It is currently represented by Councillor Bev Dubois, first elected in 2016.

== Institutions ==
=== Education ===
There are no schools in Lakewood Urban Centre. The nearest schools are in the neighbouring Lakeridge subdivision.

=== Public safety ===
- Fire Station #8 - opened on October 22, 2010. Built to serve the growing population in the southeast part of Saskatoon, construction officially began on Fire Station #8 on August 17, 2009. It cost $5.4 million to build.

== Parks and recreation ==
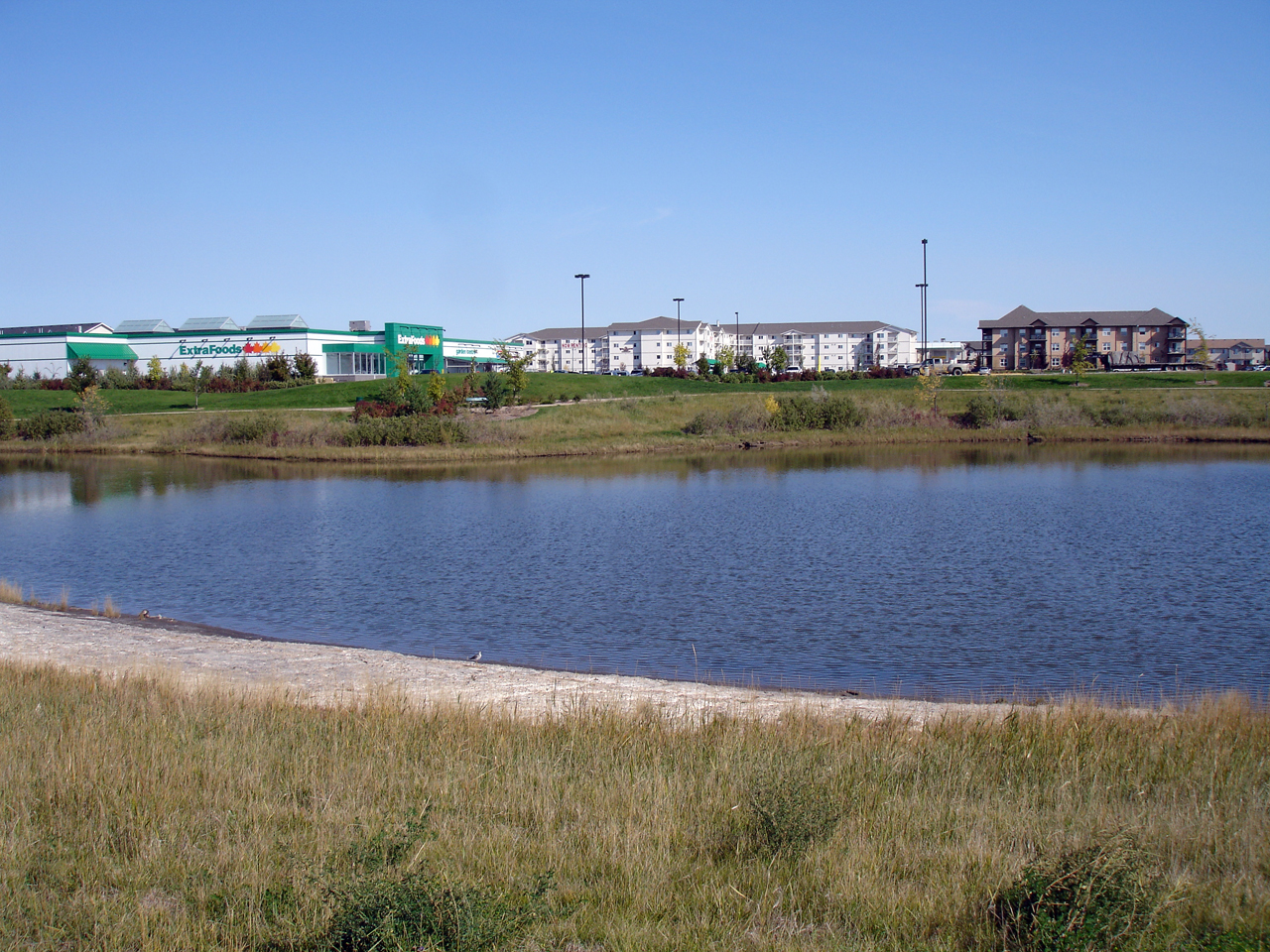
Trounce Pond

- Trounce Pond (8.7 acres)
- Southeast Park (proposed, 200 acres)

== Commercial ==
Lakewood Urban Centre has commercial development concentrated around the corner of Herold Road and Slimmon Road, with a combination of strip mall and stand-alone commercial buildings. Further commercial development is under way in the southeast corner of Rosewood, which will eventually be accessible via Taylor Street when it is extended further to the east at a later date.

== Location ==
Lakewood Urban Centre is located within the Lakewood Sector. It is bounded by Boychuk Drive to the west, and Taylor Street to the north. The south and east boundaries are formed by the new neighbourhood of Rosewood.
