= Richmond Heights, Saskatoon =

Richmond Heights
- Neighbourhood
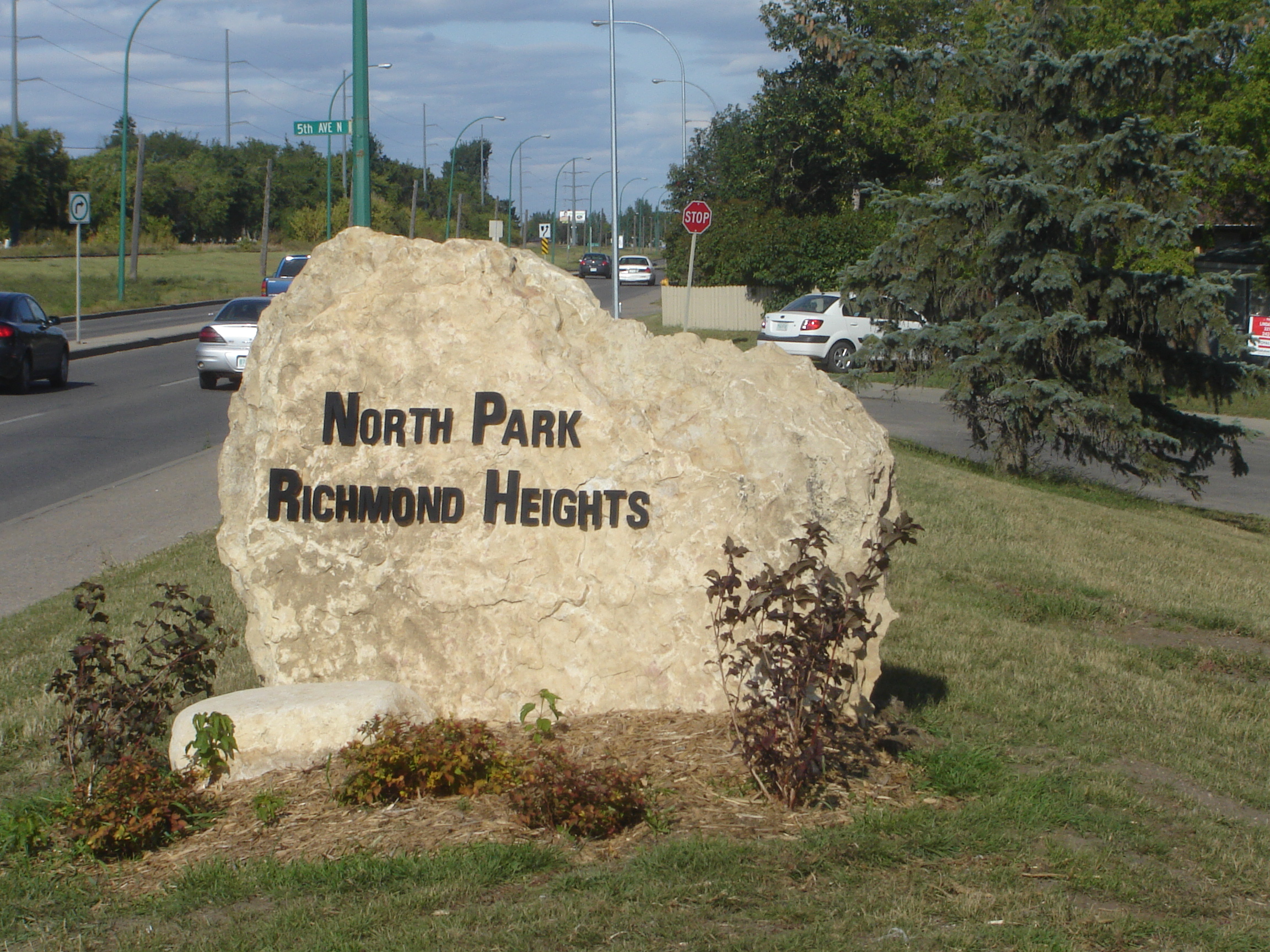
- Richmond Heights Welcome
- Interactive map of Richmond Heights
- Coordinates: 52.153611°N 106.642222°W
- Country: Canada
- Province: Saskatchewan
- City: Saskatoon
- Suburban Development Area: Lawson Suburban Development Area
- Neighbourhood: North Park
- Annexed: 1955-59
- Construction: 1960s

Government
  - Type: Municipal (Ward 1)
  - Administrative body: Saskatoon City Council
  - Councillor: Darren Hill

Population (2006)
  - Total: 940
  - Average Income: $57,275
- Time zone: UTC-6 (CST)

Richmond Heights, adjacent to the South Saskatchewan River, features walking trails in the Meewasin Valley. G.D. Archibald Park North hosts baseball and soccer games. Luther Heights is a Luther care community for those aged 60 and over. In 2006, 73.5% of the residents owned their own home; the average home size was 2.3 residents.

== Location ==
Within the Lawson Suburban Development Area (West Side), the neighbourhood of Richmond Heights is bordered on the North by Circle Drive. Warman Road lies to the west side. To the south is Windsor Street, and finally the eastern perimeter is the geophysical boundary of the South Saskatchewan River upon which G.D. Archibald Park North is found.

== History ==
Land was annexed for the Richmond Heights neighbourhood for the city of Saskatoon in 1955-59. The majority of dwellings were part of the original construction which took place in the 1960s

== Layout ==
The crescents / avenues are fashioned around Archibald Park West. The roads have been mainly named with a royal connection:

- Rupert Drive
- Richmond Crescent, Place (North, South)
- Eddy Place, Street
- Alexandra Avenue
- Noble Crescent
- Prince of Wales Avenue
- Empire Avenue

== Government and politics ==
Richmond Heights exists within the federal electoral district of Saskatoon—University. It is currently represented by Corey Tochor of the Conservative Party of Canada, first elected in 2019.

Provincially, the area is within the constituency of Saskatoon Meewasin. It is currently represented by Ryan Meili of the Saskatchewan New Democratic Party, first elected in a 2017 by-election.

In Saskatoon's non-partisan municipal politics, Richmond Heights lies within ward 1. It is currently represented by Darren Hill, first elected in 2006.

== Education ==
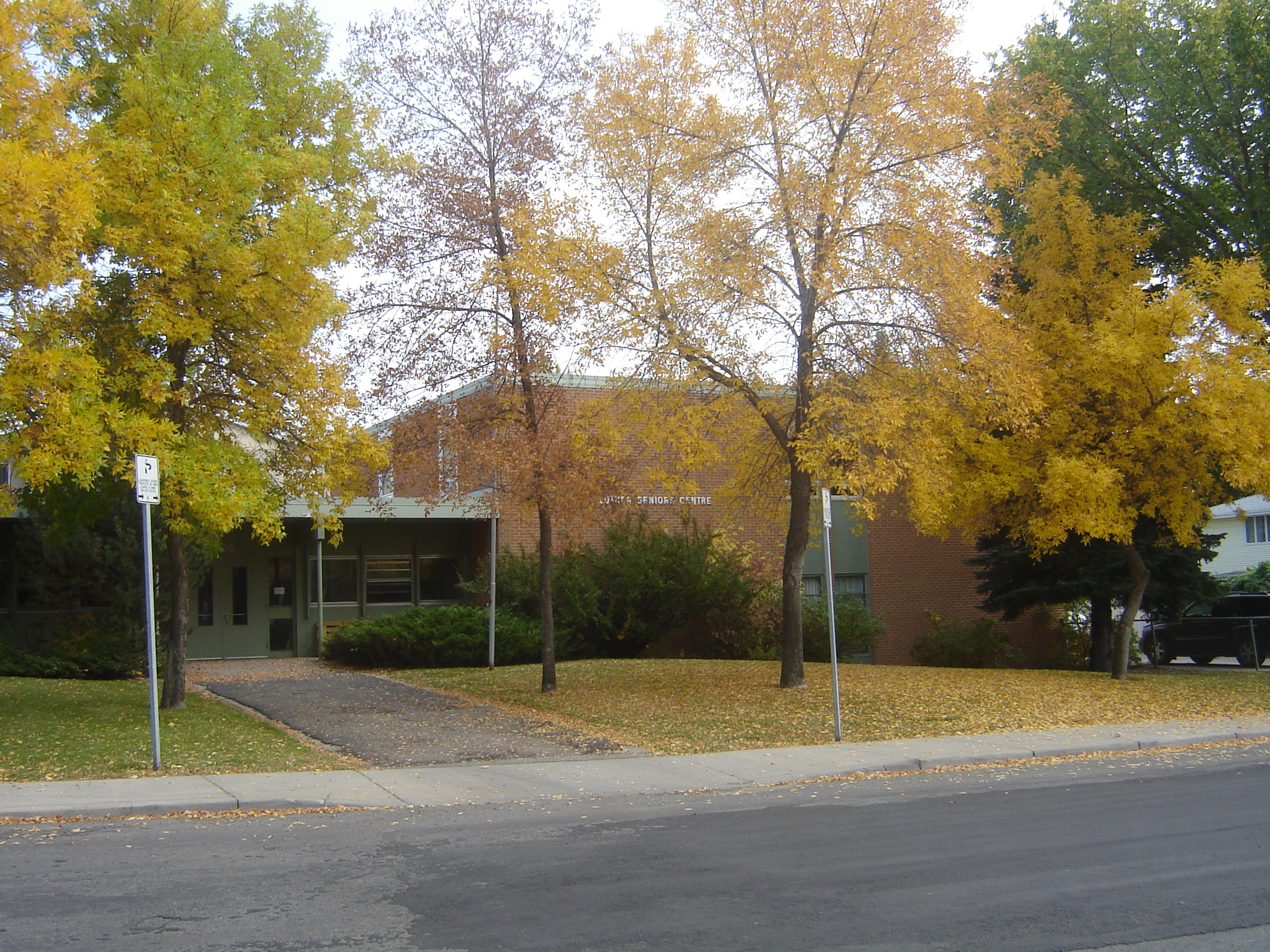
Richmond Heights Elementary School now the Luther Seniors Centre

No schools are part of this neighbourhood. In the 1970s, Richmond Heights School served kids in the neighbourhood before closing in the mid-1980s due to declining enrolment. The building is now the Luther Senior's Centre with a senior's condo complex to the east on the old playground site. Students were then transferred over to North Park Wilson School

== Shopping ==
There are some amenities within the neighbourhood such as New Red Lantern Inn in a strip mall located on Alexandra Avenue.

== Area Parks ==
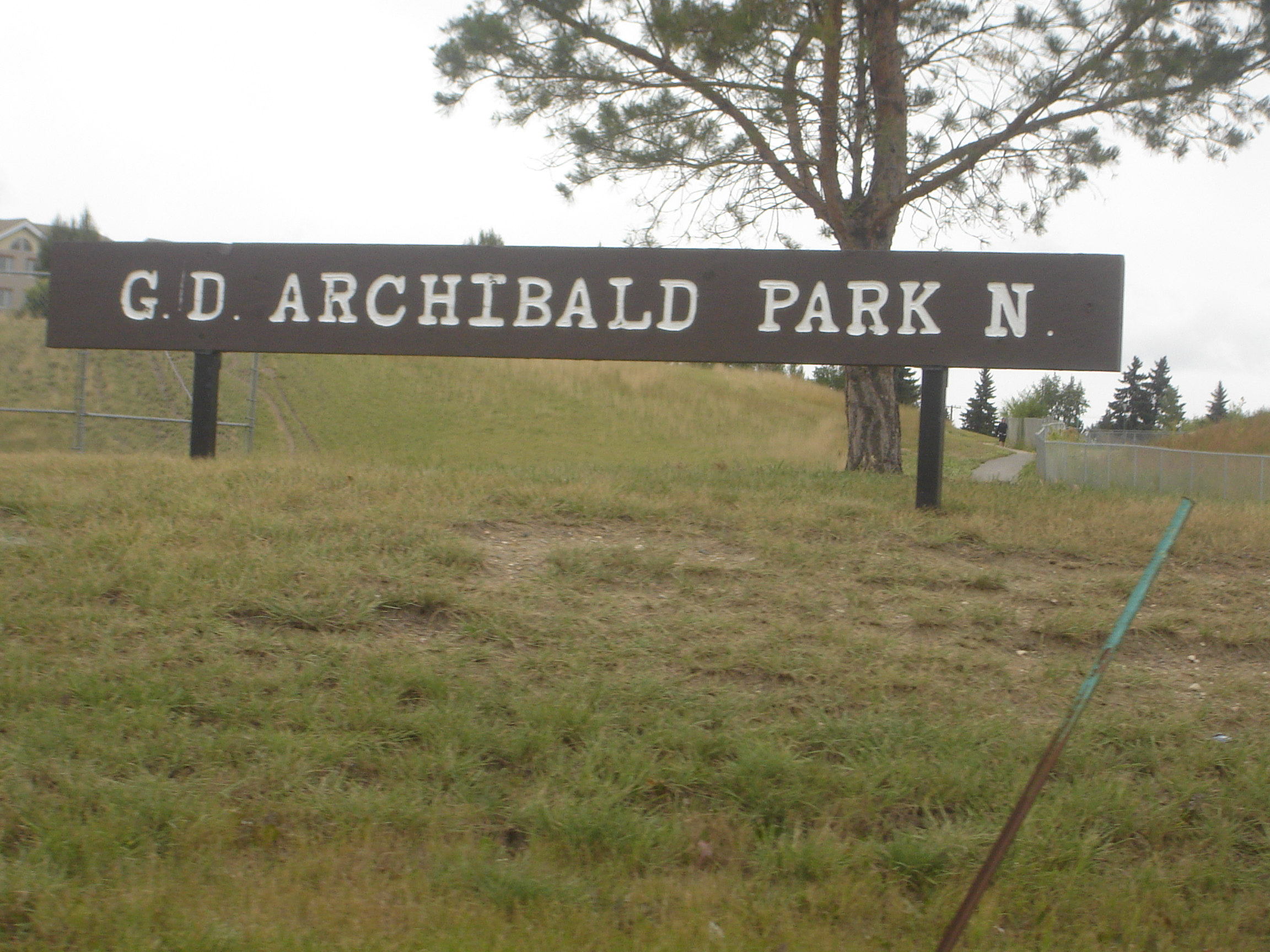
G.D. Archibald Park

- G.D. Archibald Park North (N) 8.40
  - hosts a wading pool, playground and many baseball and soccer games.
- G.D. Archibald Park West (N) 2.60

== Transportation ==
Spadina Crescent provides scenic transportation between the Central Business District and communities to the north which are part of the Lawson SDA. Warman Road is a main access road between Central Business District and the North West Industrial SDA which bypasses Richmond Heights with limited arterial access into the neighbourhood.

=== City Transit ===
Richmond Heights is serviced by City Transit Bus Routes Saskatoon Transit.

== Life ==
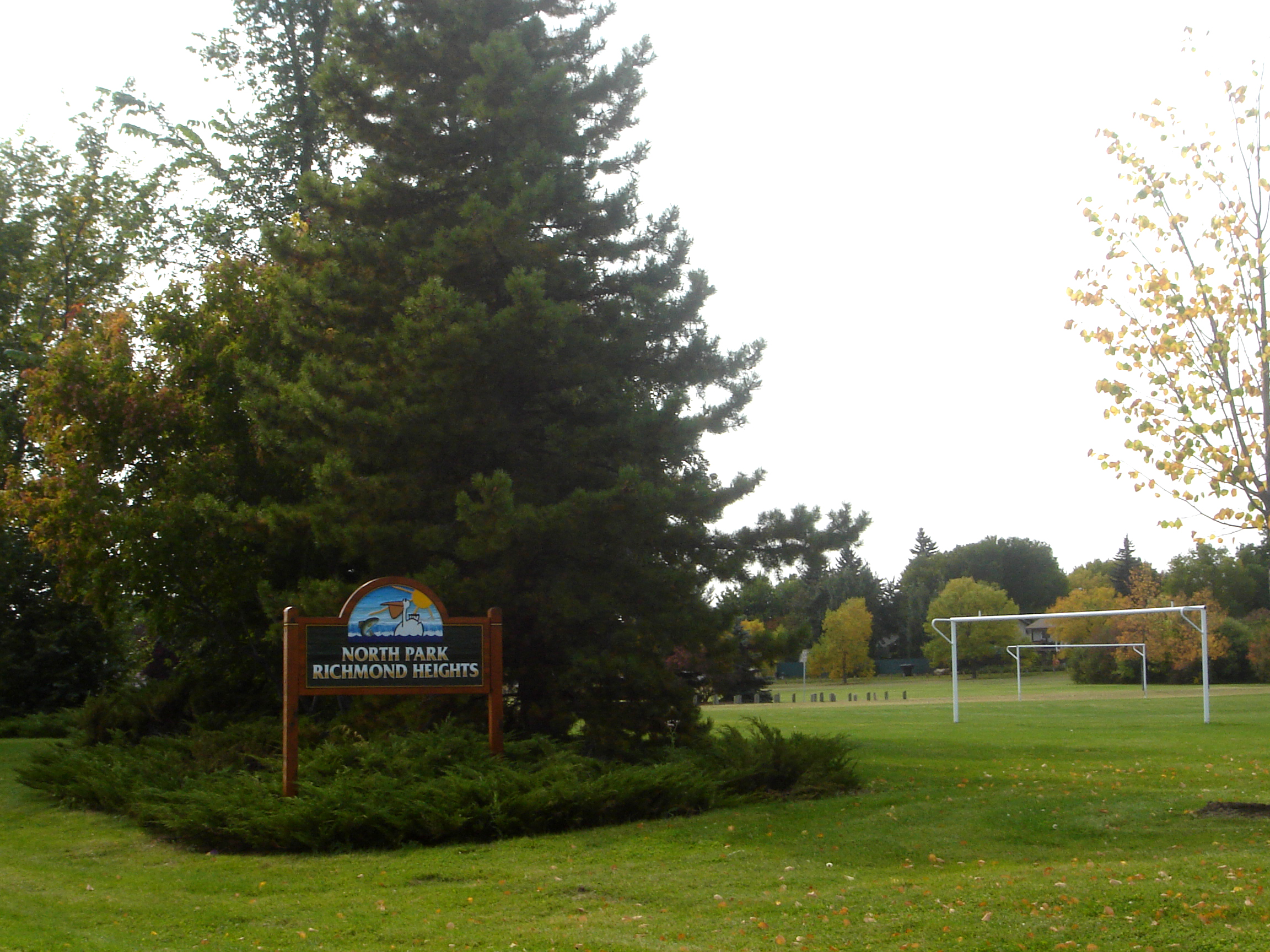
North Park Richmond Heights sign

The North Park / Richmond Heights Community Association has amalgamated to provide community services for the Saskatoon area between 33rd Street East and Circle Drive utilizing facilities available at North Park-Wilson, River Heights, and St. Paul Schools.
