= U of S Lands South Management Area, Saskatoon =

U of S Lands South Management Area
- Neighbourhood
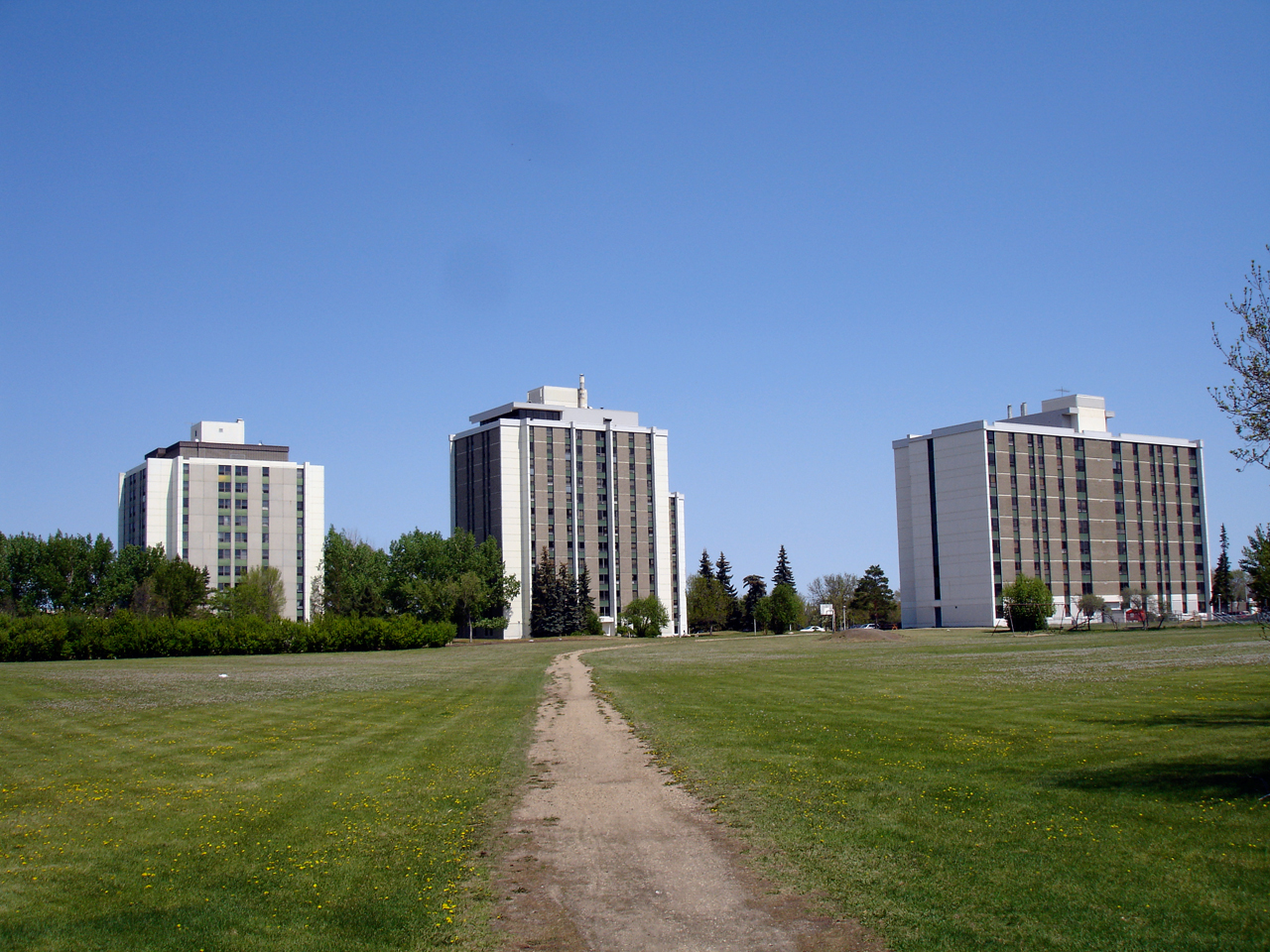
- McEown Park residence buildings

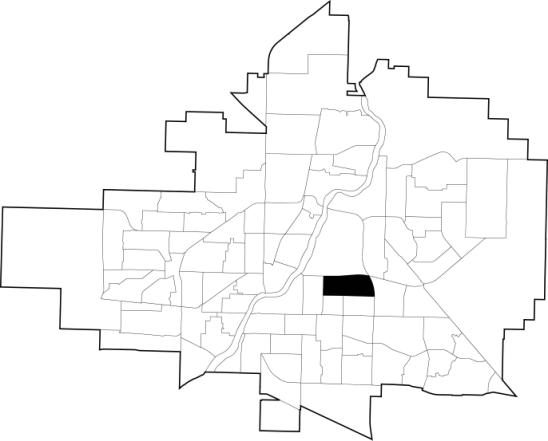
- U of S Lands South Management Area location map
- Coordinates: 52°7′30″N 106°37′22″W
- Country: Canada
- Province: Saskatchewan
- City: Saskatoon
- Suburban Development Area: Nutana
- Neighbourhood: U of S Lands South Management Area
- Annexed: 1955-1959
- Construction: 1955-1959

Government
  - Type: Municipal (Ward 1)
  - Administrative body: Saskatoon City Council
  - Councillor: Darren Hill

Area
  - Total: 1.67 km^{2} (0.64 sq mi)

Population (2006)
  - Total: 1,103
  - Average Income: $36,760
- Time zone: UTC-6 (UTC)

U of S Lands South Management Area is an area of and located in east-central Saskatoon, Saskatchewan, Canada. It is a categorized as a management area, as it lacks the residential, industrial or future development characteristics present in most neighbourhoods. The area is home to 1,103 residents living in residences belonging to the University of Saskatchewan. The neighbourhood is considered a lower-income area, with an average family income of $36,760, an average dwelling value of $221,222 and a home ownership rate of 0.2%, though this is, of course, due to residents being primarily students renting accommodation from the university.

== History ==
The land for the U of S Lands South Management Area was set aside for the University of Saskatchewan upon its creation in 1907. The city had planned to build a hospital at the corner of Cumberland Avenue and College Drive, going so far as to dig for the basements. However, the project was cancelled due to lack of funding. The excavations stood open for decades until a tragic incident forced the city to fill them in. In the mid-1950s, the Royal University Hospital was constructed in another part of the U of S property.

In 1931, the provincially funded School for the Deaf was opened. The building was renamed the R.J.D. Williams Building in 1982, after the school's longtime Dean of Residence. When deaf children were integrated into the regular school system in 1990, the School for the Deaf closed and the building was sold to the university.

Griffiths Stadium is a football playing field belonging to the University of Saskatchewan. The original stadium was located on the corner of Cumberland Avenue and College Drive, and opened in 1936. It was financed by donations from students, alumni, faculty and the business community. Students helped build the stadium as well, providing them income during the Great Depression. The desire for a new stadium and the widening of College Drive led to the construction of the current stadium a few hundred metres east of the original site. It opened on June 23, 1967. Improvements were made to the stadium prior to the 1989 Jeux Canada Games, and again in 2006 prior to hosting the Vanier Cup.

The McEown Park residence complex was opened on October 2, 1970. Three high-rise buildings were initially built: 14-storey Seager Wheeler Hall housed single students living in small groups; 11-storey Assiniboine Hall housed married students without children and single students with shared accommodation; and 9-storey Souris Hall housed married students with children. A fourth tower, Wollaston Hall, was added in 1976.

The Saskatoon Field House, a city-operated athletic facility, was officially opened on December 28, 1981.

Stadium Parkade was built over the former "Z lot" parking area to relieve parking pressure at the university campus. It was completed in 2004.

In 2006, the university began planning for the College Quarter, an expansion to the campus that would use up most of the remaining land in the South Management Area. In 2008, the university decided to partner with a private developer to build 200 student housing units on the land north of McEown Park. Saskatoon-based Meridian Development Corp., noted for its redevelopment of the downtown King George Hotel, originally planned to have the new townhouse residences completed for occupancy by the fall of 2010. However, the College Quarter master plan was not approved until December 2009, and the delay moved the completion date of the residences to the fall of 2011.

The area bordered by College Drive, Preston Avenue, Circle Drive and 14th Street, is a green belt that has been used for agricultural and horticultural study programs (as has remnant land west of Preston). Although there has been occasional suggestions of selling the land for residential development, as of 2015 no firm plans are in place for the future disposition of this land. As of 2017, official city maps show a network of roads within this area, however with the exception of a roadway accessing Patterson Gardens, these are at present utility roads not accessible to the public.

== Government and politics ==
The U of S Lands South Management Area exists within the federal electoral district of Saskatoon—University. It is currently represented by Brad Trost of the Conservative Party of Canada, first elected in 2004 and re-elected in 2006, 2008, 2011 and 2015.

Provincially, the U of S Lands South Management Area lies within the constituency of Saskatoon University. It is currently represented by former city Councillor Eric Olauson of the Saskatchewan Party, first elected in 2016.

In Saskatoon's non-partisan municipal politics, the U of S Lands South Management Area lies within ward 1. It is currently represented by Councillor Darren Hill, first elected in 2006.

== Institutions ==
=== Education ===
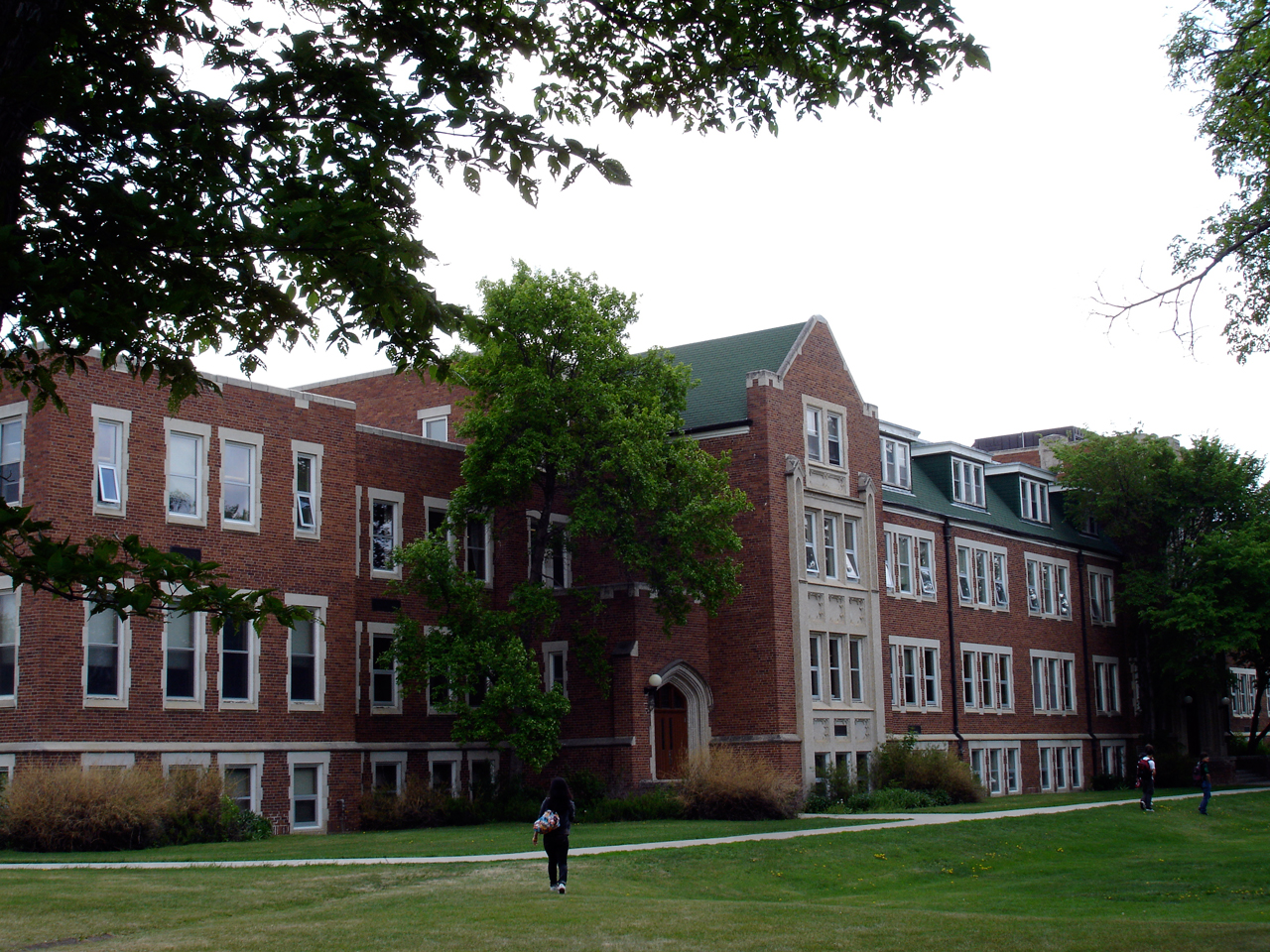
R.J.D. Williams Building

The University of Saskatchewan's Centre for Continuing and Distance Education (formerly the Extension Division) is located in the R.J.D. Williams Building.

== Parks and recreation ==
There are no city-administered parks within the U of S Lands South MA. However, much of the west section surrounding the McEown Park residences and Griffiths Stadium is green space and is therefore utilized in the same manner as a park.

The Saskatoon Field House is a multi-use sports facility. It features an indoor track; indoor courts for tennis, badminton, soccer and basketball; a weight room; fitness/dance studios; and multipurpose rooms for meetings.

Griffiths Stadium is home to the University of Saskatchewan's football team, the Huskies.

== Commercial ==
There is no major commercial development in this area, with the primary exception being a hotel. The closest businesses are in the northwest corner of the adjacent Varsity View neighbourhood. However, there are 3 home-based businesses.

== Location ==
U of S Lands South Management Area is located within the University Heights Suburban Development Area. It is bounded by College Drive to the north, 14th Street to the south, Circle Drive to the east, and Cumberland Avenue to the west. The only other road of note is Preston Avenue, which roughly bisects the area.
