= West Industrial, Saskatoon =

West Industrial
- Neighbourhood
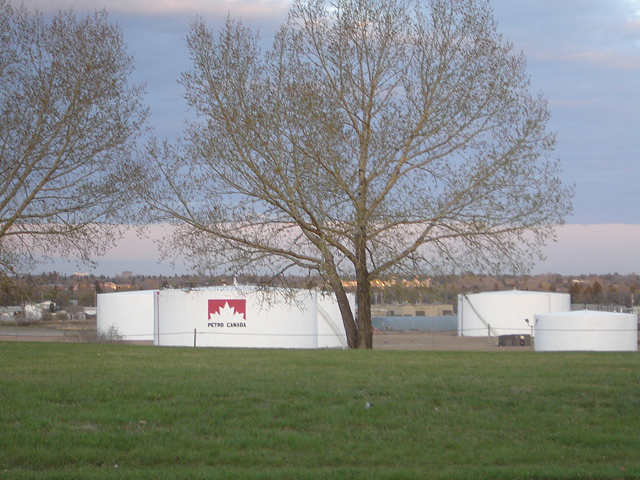
- Petro Can
- Interactive map of West Industrial
- Coordinates: 52°7′19″N 106°41′35″W
- Country: Canada
- Province: Saskatchewan
- City: Saskatoon
- Suburban Development Area: Confederation SDA
- Construction: 1960s

Government
  - Type: Municipal (Ward 2)
  - Administrative body: Saskatoon City Council
  - Councillor: Hilary Gough
- Time zone: UTC-6 (CST)
- GNBC CGNDB Key: HAVEO

West Industrial is a light industrial area in Saskatoon, Saskatchewan, Canada. This neighbourhood extends north of 11th Street, south of the rail and west of Avenue P south.
