= AgPro Industrial, Saskatoon =

AgPro Industrial
- Neighbourhood
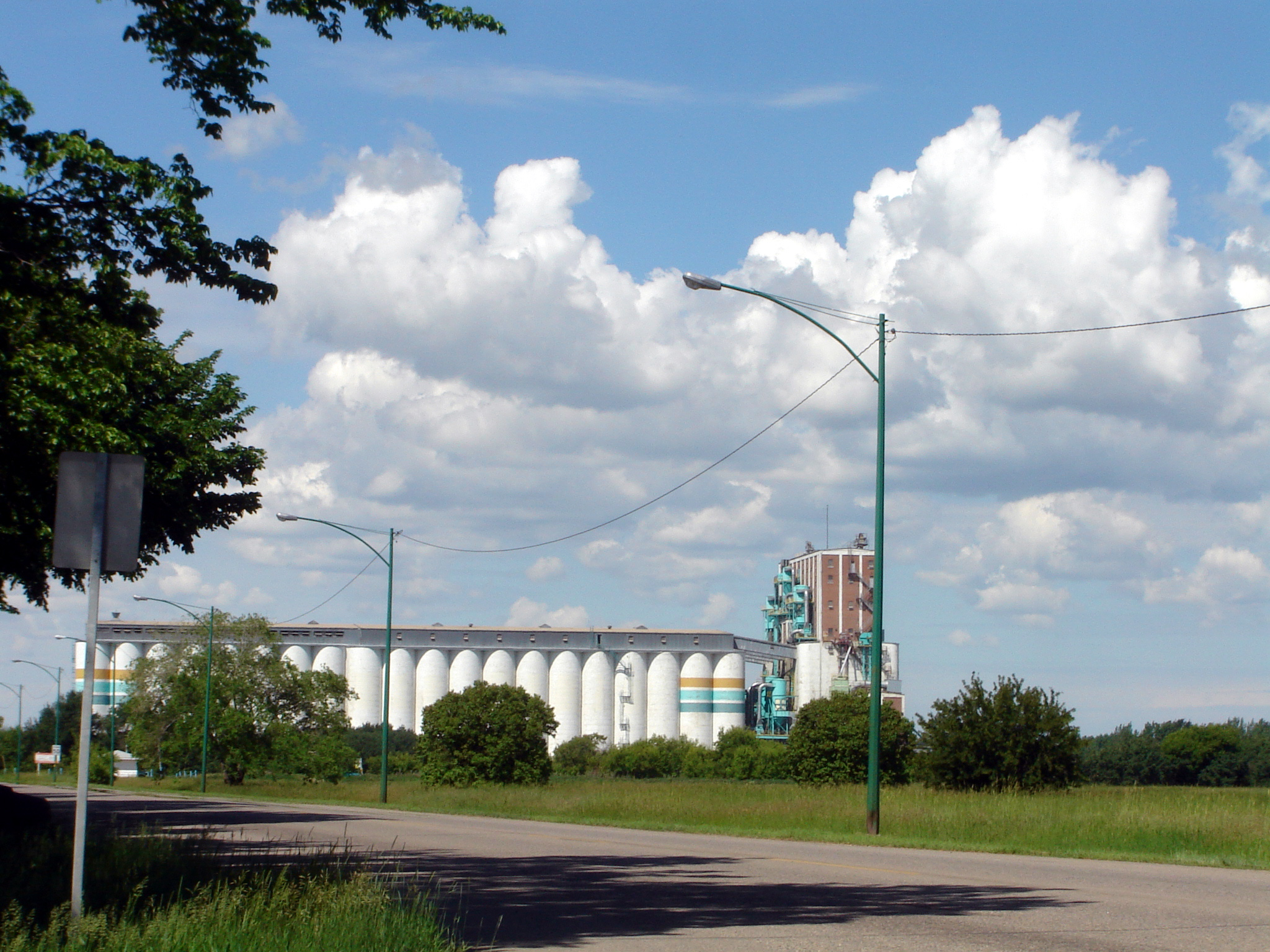
- Viterra (old Agpro) Terminal
- Interactive map of AgPro Industrial
- Coordinates: 52°6′58″N 106°44′31″W
- Country: Canada
- Province: Saskatchewan
- City: Saskatoon
- Suburban Development Area: Confederation SDA
- Neighbourhood: AgPro Industrial

Government
  - Type: Municipal (Ward 2)
  - Administrative body: Saskatoon City Council
  - Councillor: Hilary Gough
- Time zone: UTC-6 (CST)

AgPro Industrial is a small industrial subdivision located in west Saskatoon, Saskatchewan, Canada. Located in the Confederation SDA along 11th Street West and nestled between the residential communities of Fairhaven and Montgomery Place. 11th Street provides direct access to Saskatchewan Highway 7 and the newly completed Circle Drive.

A large portion of AgPro Industrial's east end was redesignated for residential development as a result of 11th Street being realigned to make way for the southwest Circle Drive extension and was subsequently absorbed by Montgomery Place; as of 2014 development of multi-family apartments has taken place.

== Economy ==
The Viterra Grain Terminal, formerly known as the Canadian Government Elevators, is located within this subdivision and is, as of 2014, the major commercial operation in the subdivision. Known for many years as the AgPro Grain Terminal, in January 2002, the Saskatchewan Wheat Pool (SWP) absorbed all of the AgPro Grain. As of 2012, it operates under the Viterra brand. The building itself has been a Saskatoon landmark since the 1930s. Although the facility no longer carries the AgPro name, the City of Saskatoon still officially labels this subdivision AgPro Industrial.

Kramer Ltd., a machinery dealership for Caterpillar, is also in this area. The SWP also operated a standard-sized grain elevator to the northwest of the Viterra terminal for many years, but this structure has been demolished.

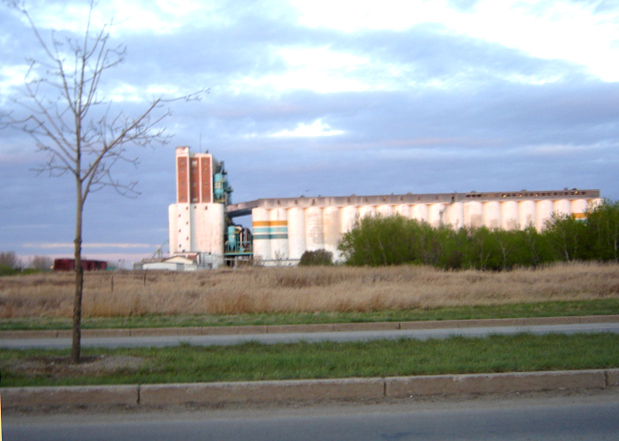
Viterra (old Agpro) Terminal

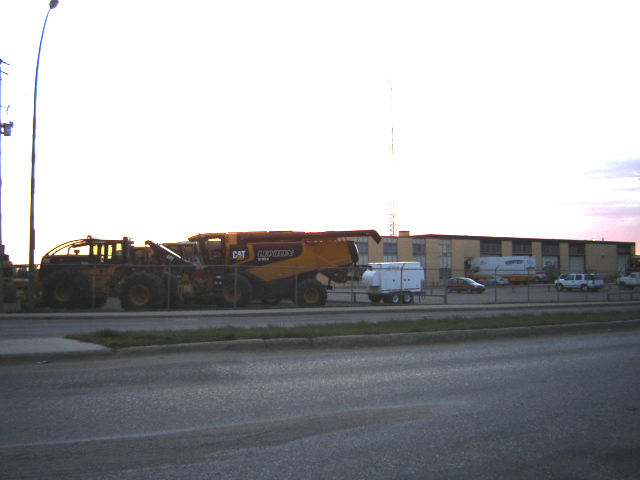
Kramer Tractor
