= South West Industrial, Saskatoon =

South West Industrial
- Neighbourhood
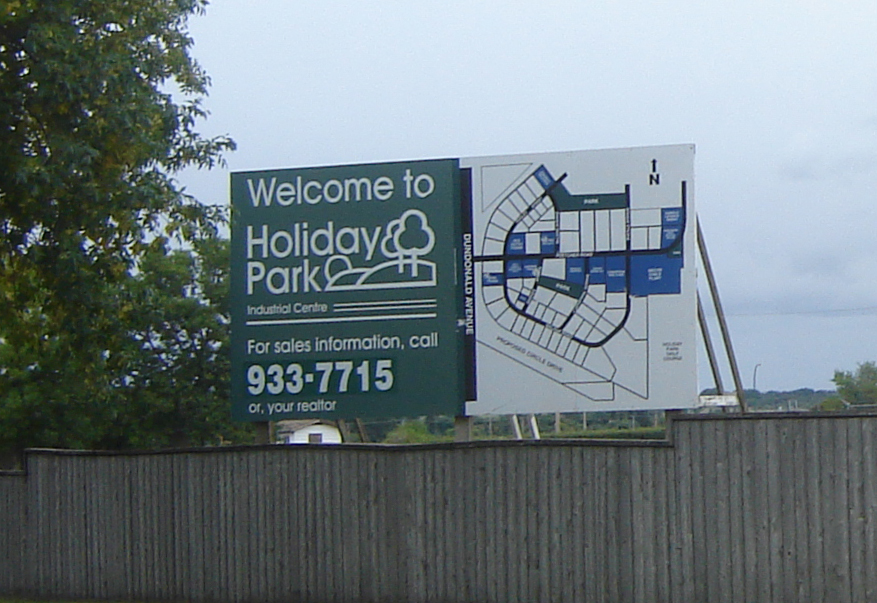
- The former Holiday Park Industrial Map sign, which stood at the former intersection of Dundonald Avenue & Fletcher Road, which was removed in 2010 as part of the Circle Drive South project
- Coordinates: 52°06′40″N 106°42′36″W
- Country: Canada
- Province: Saskatchewan
- City: Saskatoon
- Suburban Development Area: Confederation SDA
- Neighbourhood: South West Industrial

Government
  - Type: Municipal (Ward 2)
  - Administrative body: Saskatoon City Council
  - Councillor: Hilary Gough
- Time zone: UTC-6 (UTC)

South West Industrial, also known as Holiday Park Industrial and labelled SEDCO Industrial on city maps of the 1980s and 1990s, is an industrial subdivision located in the Confederation SDA in southwest Saskatoon, Saskatchewan, Canada.

== History ==
The area now known as South West Industrial had appeared at various times on city maps going back to at least the 1950s. Initially designed with a grid street layout, the area was originally conceived as a residential community. Later, however, the decision was made to promote industrial development. The current layout appeared on maps beginning in the early 1980s; the only portion of the original layout to survive was a remnant of Avenue Z that existed until Intercontinental Packers expanded its parking lot in the 1980s. As part of the concept plans after the demolition of the plant, the roadway returned, as part of an alignment that saw a new entrance road from 11th Street, in lieu of the elimination of the Fletcher Road exit at Dundonald Avenue as part of the Circle Drive South project. In order to make a new roadway into the industrial park, Dudley Street was realigned at the new road, which was named Dawes Avenue. The names assigned to the area are mostly names that had been assigned to other streets that were either removed or renamed in prior years; for example, Jonathan and Barnes come from streets that had been planned for the McNab Park community, but never developed; Malouf was originally assigned to a cul-de-sac in Parkridge that was renamed something else.

== Economy ==
Major businesses include Cameco Corporation, Hi-Way Greenhouse, Can-Pro Auto Parts and Mercury Graphics. The area was originally dominated by the Mitchell's Gourmet Foods plant (once known as Intercontinental Packers) for decades, until the building was demolished in the late 2000s to make way for an extension of Circle Drive. Although the subdivision has existed since the 1980s, it has a large number of vacant lots; this had the benefit of facilitating the construction of Circle Drive in the early 2010s as the City of Saskatoon was able to appropriate land for the freeway (and, specifically, its interchange with Valley Road) without needing to deal with too many businesses other than the aforementioned Mitchell's plant.

== Transportation ==
11th Street West and Circle Drive are the main traffic arteries into the area. The main road through South West Industrial is Fletcher Road, which becomes Avenue W to the north of Dudley Street. Construction of Circle Drive, however, forced the removal of Fletcher Road's western access into the area; the City built Dawes Avenue as a connector to 11th Street by way of Dudley Street, to compensate.

=== City Transit ===
South West Industrial is served by Saskatoon Transit bus route #9 (Riversdale/City Centre).

== Location ==
The southern boundary of the South West Industrial is the CNR track. The CPR tracks (west of Avenue W) and 11th Street West form the northern boundary. Holiday Park and the Gordie Howe Management Area lie to the east, and Dundonald Avenue forms the western boundary.

On June 20, 2008, the mayor announced that funding for the $300 million project from the federal, provincial and city governments was put in place to build a six-lane bridge and 7 km of freeway to complete the road. The project opened on July 31, 2013. One of the main access points into South West Industrial, Fletcher Road via Dundonald Avenue, was closed to make way for an interchange between Circle Drive and Valley Road; the only points of entrance and egress into the area is from the north and east. Several streets were also realigned to make way for the interchange; no demolition was required for this, however the alignment of the Circle Drive freeway itself and construction of an interchange at 11th Street West required one of the area's major tenants, Intercontinental Packers, to relocate and its longstanding facility east of 11th Street and Dundonald Avenue was demolished.
