= North Industrial, Saskatoon =

North Industrial
- Neighbourhood
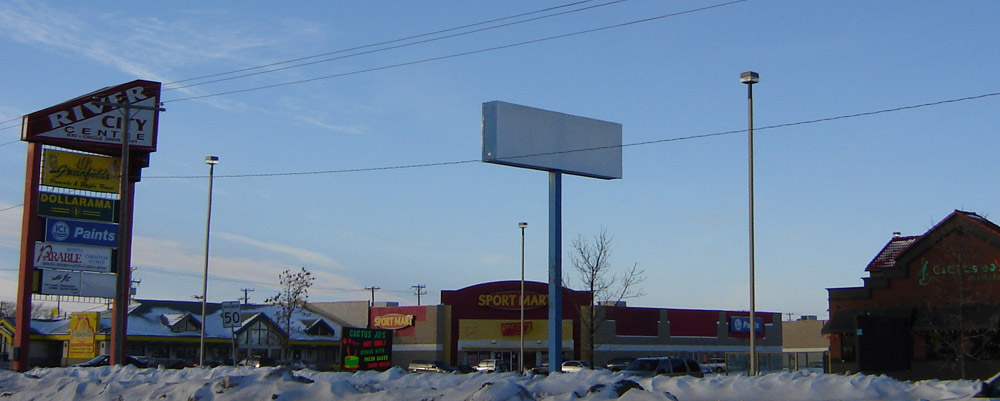
- River City Centre Mall
- Interactive map of North Industrial
- Coordinates: 52.161667°N 106.667222°W
- Country: Canada
- Province: Saskatchewan
- City: Saskatoon
- Suburban Development Area: North Industrial SDA
- Neighbourhood: North Industrial

Government
  - Type: Municipal (Ward 5)
  - Administrative body: Saskatoon City Council
  - Councillor: Randy Donauer

Area
  - Total: 2.59 km^{2} (1.00 sq mi)
- Time zone: UTC−6 (CST)

North Industrial is an established industrial community in the city of Saskatoon, Saskatchewan, which consists primarily of industrial and retail development.

== Industrial characteristics ==
Undeveloped land, office space, and existing industrial facilities are available in Saskatoon albeit considering Saskatoon's economic growth over the past years has been exponential. Industrial footage can be rented between $4.00 and $7.00, whereas Office square footage runs about $6.00. North Industrial contains Suburban Office Housing by providing 20.9% of Saskatoon's office real estate or 451,607 square feet (41,955.7 m^{2}). The north industrial fully serviced premium location industrial lots sell for about $190,000 an acre.

== Layout ==
51st Street is the northern edge of this industrial area. Idylwyld Drive runs concurrent with Highway 11 or Louis Riel Trail which runs concurrent with the Yellowhead Highway and Highway 16 marks the western boundary. Whereas Railway tracks which are parallel to Millar Avenue mark the eastern. To the south Circle Drive which is concurrent with the Yellowhead Highway, Trans-Canada Highway, and Highway 16 is included. At the southern perimeter all properties which extend from Venture Crescent and 40A Street East.

Until the late 1990s, North Industrial also included the industrial lands north of 51st Street, west of the rail line, and east of Idylwyld Drive up to 60th Street, but a reorganization of community boundaries resulted in the area north of 51st Street being redesignated Hudson Bay Industrial. North Industrial retained its name, even though it is no longer geographically accurate, having been supplanted by Hudson Bay Industrial and other areas further to the north.

== History ==
The North Industrial district was considered Saskatoon's northern gateway when development began in the 1950s and 1960s (there had been an earlier attempt at an industrial subdivision to the northeast called Factoria that had been unsuccessful). Development of the area began to accelerate in the 1960s with the development of Circle Drive, which incorporated the area's southern boundary, 42nd Street. Construction of Circle Drive facilitated the opening up of North Industrial to development, although the bridge and northeast leg of the freeway wasn't constructed until the early 1980s.

One popular destination for Saskatonians in the 1960s was the Skyway Drive-In, which remained open until the mid-1970s and was located north of Circle Drive or at the SE quarter of Section 34, Twp. 28, Range 24, Meridian W3. Presently if it was still existing it would be just north of 44th Street between Faithfull Avenue and Northridge Drive.

Development of the Circle Drive ring road resulted in 42nd Street being renamed Circle Drive in the mid-1960s, though it is still common to hear longtime residents using the old name (and, by association, the Circle Drive Bridge to the east is often called the "42nd Street Bridge"). Despite being connected to a freeway, the old 42nd Street segment continues to be used as of 2015 as a commercial arterial road, with assorted strip malls and big box retailers.

In the early 1980s, an attempt at purchasing the St. Louis Blues National Hockey League franchise included plans to develop a hockey arena in North Industrial, north of the Skyway Drive-In site. After the deal was rejected by NHL commissioners, plans for the new arena also stalled; eventually another site in nearby Agri-Place was chosen and Saskatchewan Place (now Credit Union Centre) was built.

== Shopping ==
=== River City Centre Mall ===
River City Centre Mall
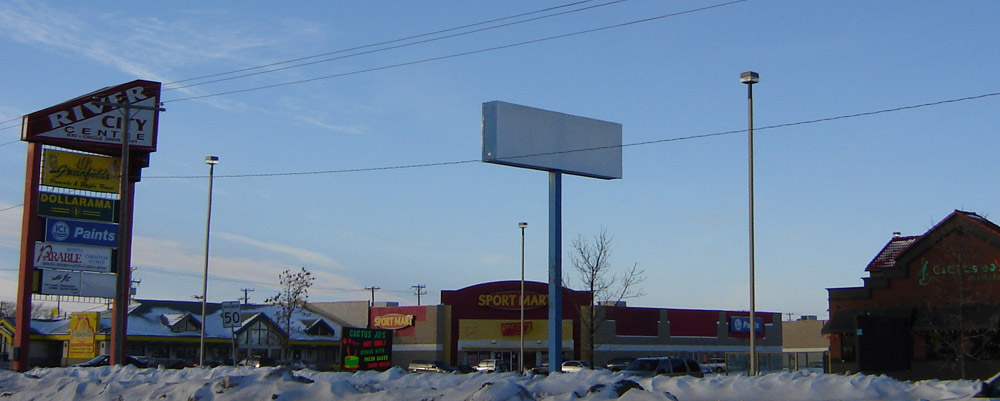
- Location: North Industrial, Saskatoon, Saskatchewan, Canada
- Owner: Sunstone Holdings of Regina
- Num. of anchor tenants: 5; Sears Home Centre, Giant Tiger, Staples, Scott's Parables, Dollarama
- Floors: 1
- Parking: above ground free

River City Centre Mall was Saskatoon's first big box-format shopping centre. Located at Circle Drive and Millar Avenue, it sold for $22 Million in April 2006.

== Recycling ==
SARCAN recycling in the North Industrial is located at 2327 Faithful Ave.

== Transportation ==
=== City Transit ===
Saskatoon Transit runs several routes through the North Industrial area, with links to both residential areas and other industrial developments.
