= Agriplace, Saskatoon =

Agriplace
- Neighbourhood
- Interactive map of Agriplace
- Coordinates: 52°11′33″N 106°40′53″W
- Country: Canada
- Province: Saskatchewan
- City: Saskatoon
- Sector: Riel Industrial Sector
- Annexed: 1980-1984

Government
  - Type: Municipal (Ward 5)
  - Administrative body: Saskatoon City Council
  - Councillor: Randy Donauer
- Time zone: UTC−6 (UTC)

Agriplace is an industrial park located in the Riel Industrial Sector Suburban Development Area of Saskatoon, Saskatchewan. Industrial parks are usually located close to transport facilities, especially where more than one transport modalities coincide. Sk Hwy 16, the Yellowhead, Sk Hwy 11, and Sk Hwy 11 are all accessed directly from Agriplace. The Saskatoon John G. Diefenbaker International Airport is southwest of the Sk Hwy 16, the Yellowhead highway.

== Geography ==
The land was annexed from the rural municipality of Corman Park between 1980 and 1984. The agriplace subdivision is nestled between three major trucking routes. Sk Hwy 16, the Yellowhead departs Saskatoon to North Battleford to the north west. Sk Hwy 11 to Prince Albert via Warman, and Sk Hwy 12 to Blaine Lake via Martensville mark the eastern boundary. 71st Street is the northern perimeter of the industrial park.

== History ==
First laid out in the early 1980s, Agriplace became well known to Saskatonians through the decision to replace the original downtown Saskatoon Arena with a new indoor arena facility. Three major locations were considered: on the site of a decommissioned power plant just west of the original Arena location (lands now part of River Landing), a site in the North Industrial district east of Idylwyld Drive, and a site in the south portion of the yet-to-be-developed Agriplace. Ultimately, Agriplace was chosen for the location of Saskatchewan Place (later renamed Credit Union Centre), an initially controversial decision due to Agriplace's remote location relative to the rest of the city and the fact accessing the area requires driving on freeways (it was not until the extension of Marquis Drive in the early 2010s that motorists from Saskatoon were given a non-freeway/non-service road option for accessing the area).

At one point the City of Saskatoon also pursued plans to relocate the city's exhibition grounds onto lands adjacent to the new arena and north of 60th Street West, but public opposition and lack of space led to this plan being dropped by the late 1980s.

Agriplace also received some additional notoriety when it first appeared on City maps. One of the area's major streets carries the name "Thatcher Avenue"; it appeared on maps the same year former MLA Colin Thatcher was on trial for murder, a sensational case that attracted international attention. In this case, however, the street wasn't named for Thatcher nor his father, former Saskatchewan Premier Ross Thatcher, but rather for a species of wheat, in keeping with the general naming conventions in the area.

In 2003, Saunders Avenue, one of the access roads into Credit Union Centre, was renamed Bill Hunter Avenue in honor of the hockey manager and promoter who attempted to get the St. Louis Blues National Hockey League team transferred to Saskatoon in the 1980s. The renaming was noted with irony as Hunter opposed the Agriplace location of the arena.

== Economy ==
The agriplace industrial park is a mix of commercial and industrial concerns. Costco, a members only bulk grocery and department store, is a major employer in the agriplace district. SaskTel Centre, formerly named Credit Union Centre and Saskatchewan Place, is a 12,000-seat arena hosting sporting, concert and large events to Saskatoon. Canlan Ice Sports Agriplace Centre is located on Apex Street. The Husky truck stop has relocated from Circle Drive to Agriplace. Motel 6 an Tim Hortons have opened near the Husky.

In the Agriplace subdivision are located 48 sectors giving employment to 780 full-time employees and 221 part-time employees.
