= C.N. Industrial, Saskatoon =

C.N. Industrial Area
- Neighbourhood
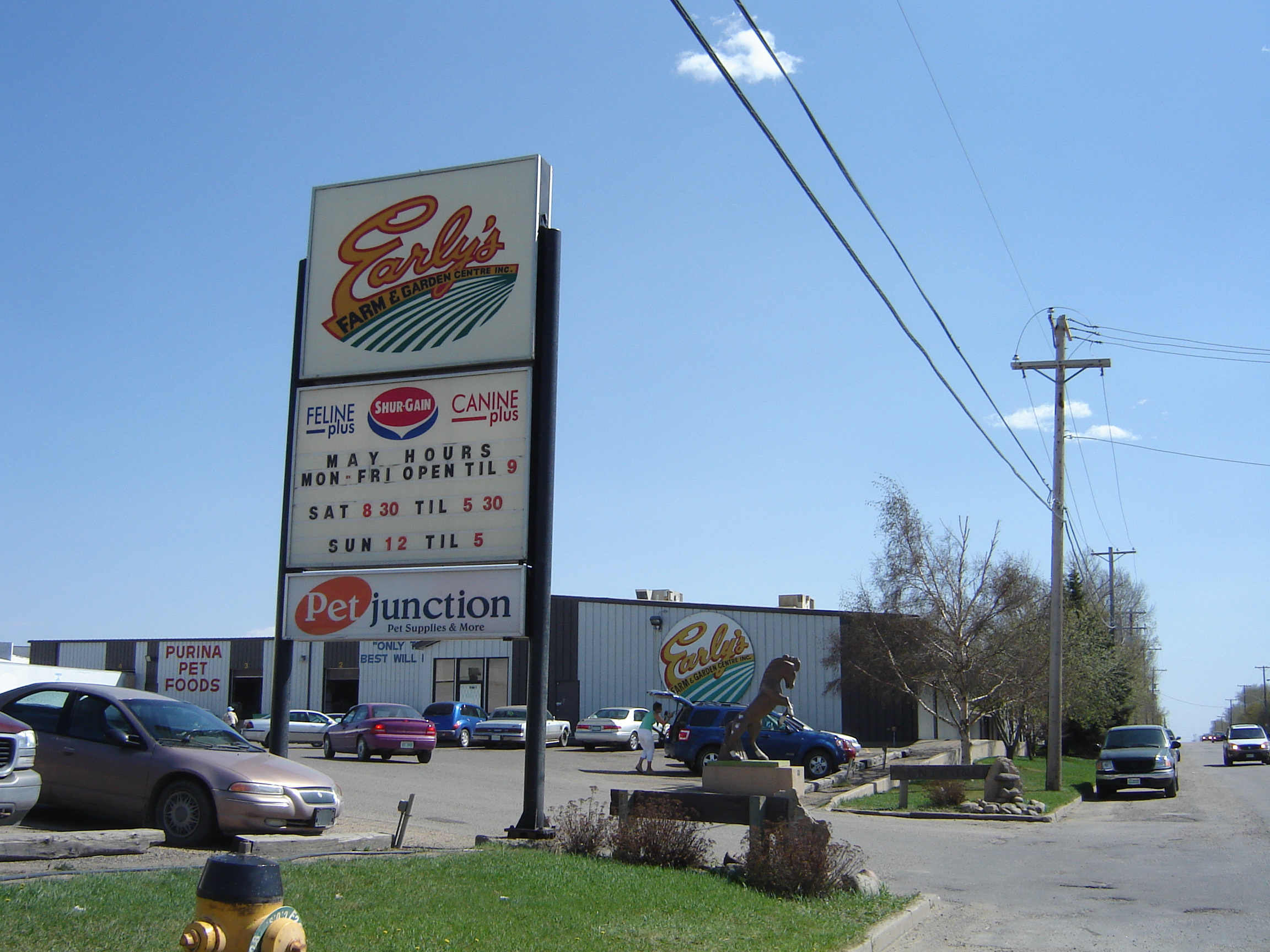
- Early's Seed and Feed
- Interactive map of C.N. Industrial Area
- Coordinates: 52°5′21″N 106°39′49″W
- Country: Canada
- Province: Saskatchewan
- City: Saskatoon
- Suburban Development Area: Nutana
- Neighbourhood: C.N. Industrial Area
- Annexed: 1960-1964
- CN Industrial 2 Annexed: 1965-1969

Government
  - Type: Municipal (Ward 7)
  - Administrative body: Saskatoon City Council
  - Councillor: Mairin Loewen

Population (2006)
  - Average Income: $
- Time zone: UTC-6 (UTC)

The CN Industrial Area is the industrial subdivision located in southern Saskatoon. It is also known as South Saskatoon, after the CN rail siding located in the area. It is a part of the Nutana Suburban Development Area. This industrial park was established with the Grand Trunk Pacific Railway crossing the South Saskatchewan River.

C.N. Industrial is bisected by Circle Drive, which directly links to all major highways entering the city, and is also connected directly to the Idylwyld Freeway, which links to downtown Saskatoon.

This neighbourhood on the east side of Saskatoon is not to be confused with the Canadian National Railway (C.N.) Yards Management Area located on Chappell Drive in the Confederation SDA of Saskatoon's west side. These two sides of Saskatoon are connected with the Grand Trunk Bridge (aka CN railway bridge) and the Gordie Howe Bridge over the South Saskatchewan River.

== Geography ==
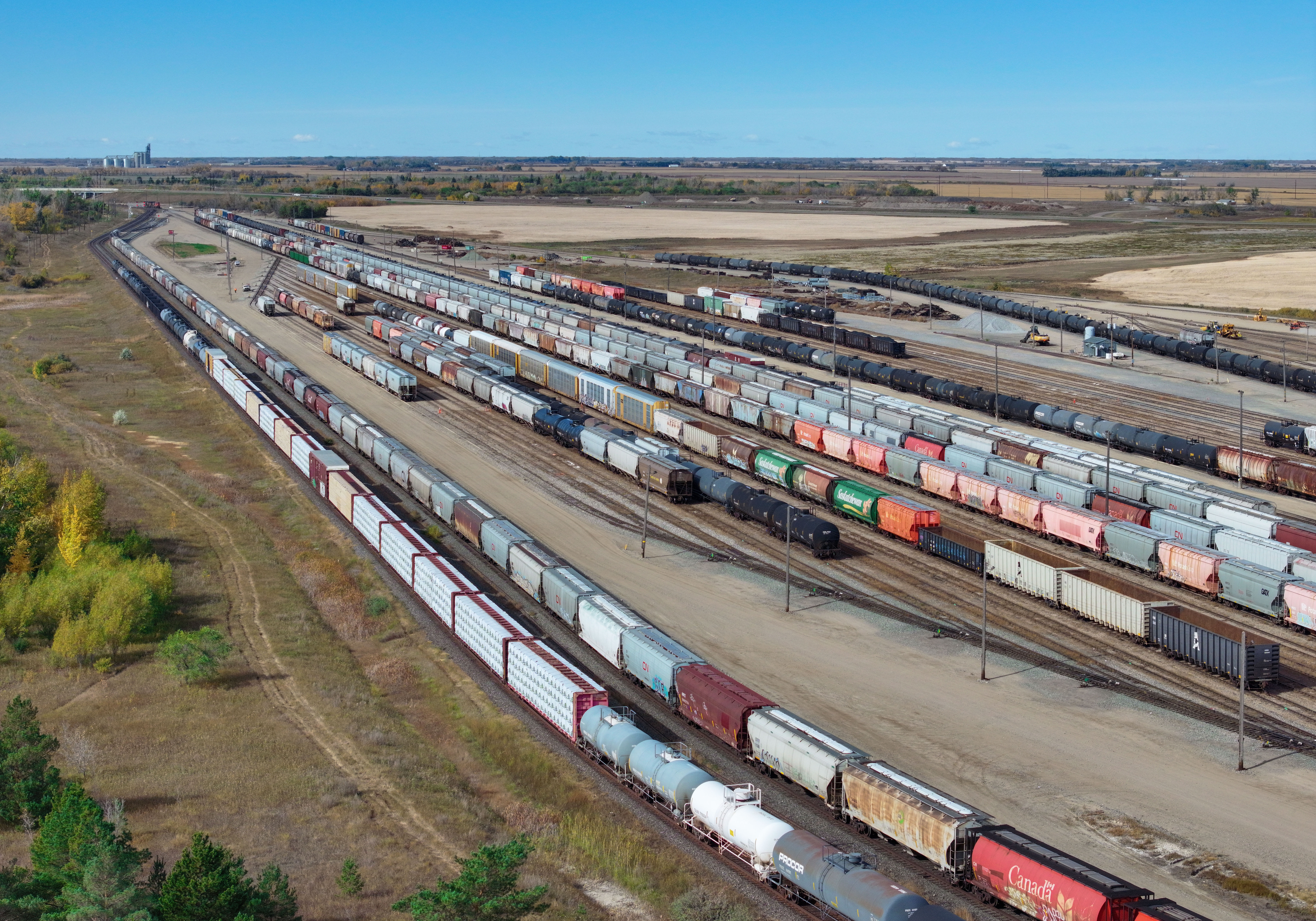
CN Chappell Yard

CN Industrial is bordered to the south by The Willows, Saskatoon, on the north by Idylwyld Drive and Avalon. Stonebridge is to the east, and Sk Hwy 219 to the west. Diefenbaker management area and the South Saskatchewan River are west of the CN Industrial area. The auto mall is a newer part of the CN Industrial area east of Portage Avenue to Clarence Avenue. There is a new interchange at Clarence Avenue and Idylwyld Drive to provide easier access to the area.

The Grand Trunk Bridge (Saskatoon) or CN Bridge crosses the South Saskatchewan River between the Queen Elizabeth Power Station on the upstream (west) side and Diefenbaker Park on the downstream (east) side. The train bridge commenced construction work in 1906 with rail line service beginning on September 21, 1908. A southwest extension of Circle Drive, which opened in July 2013, passes through C.N. Industrial. Access to businesses in C.N. Industrial is facilitated via an interchange at Lorne Avenue, but the area is now split into two sections with Jasper Avenue no longer crossing Circle Drive.

== Economy ==
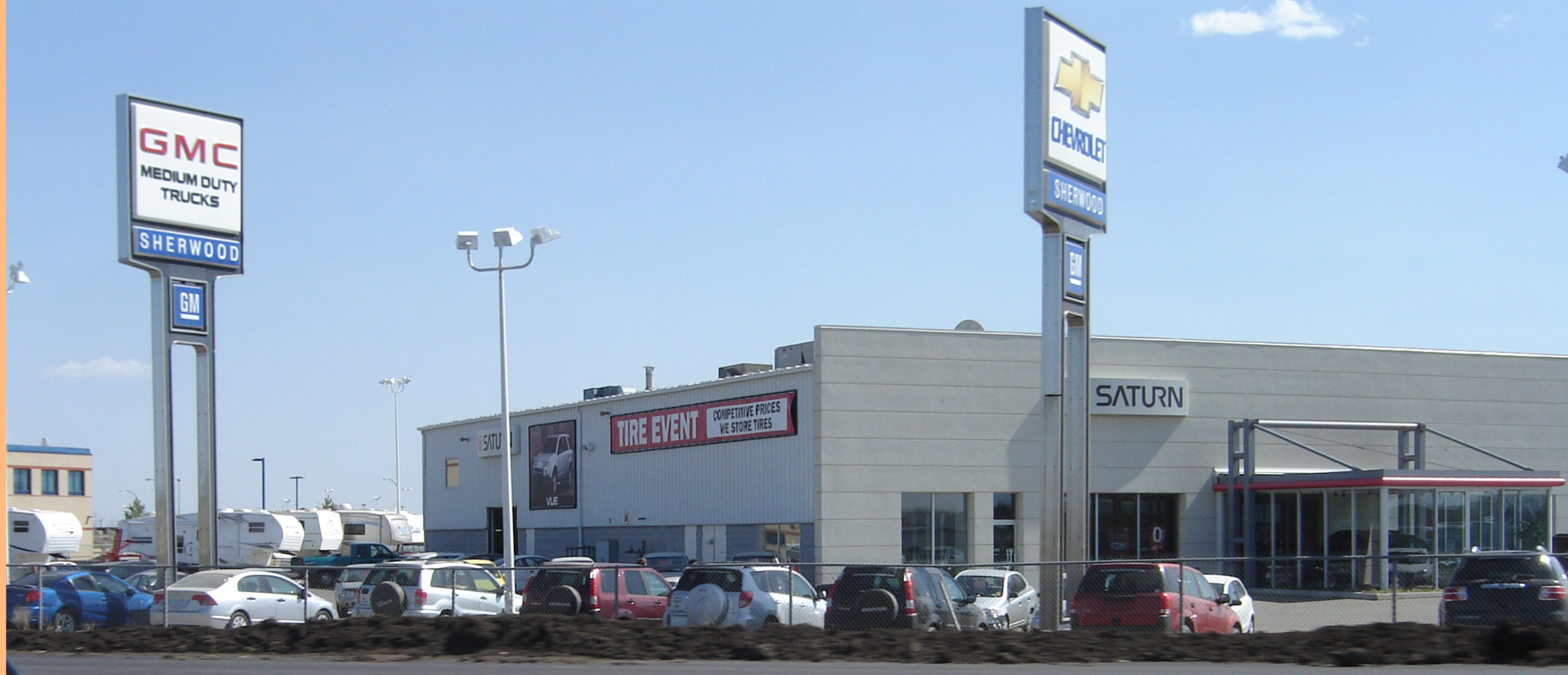
Auto mall

Some of the major employers in this area are Early Seed and Feed, Roadex Services, Ltd., and Speedway Moving & Storage. The Saskatoon Auto Mall, which opened on the east side of C.N. Industrial in the early 2000s, includes Saturn, Mini, Sherwood, Chevrolet, and BMW auto dealers, most of whom relocated to the auto mall from locations along 8th Street.

In addition, retail development has occurred on the west side of Clarence Avenue south of Brand Road in the wake of development of the Stonebridge commercial hub to the east and new residential communities beyond it. The city's detachment of the Royal Canadian Mounted Police relocated to C.N. Industrial from its previous location on 8th Street East in the 2000s. As of early 2019, a hotel is under construction at Lorne Avenue and Jasper Avenue North.

The Saskatchewan Western Development Museum maintains its major storage/refurbishment facility off Lorne Avenue in this area, southeast of the Saskatoon public branch of the museum.
