= Marquis Industrial, Saskatoon =

Marquis Industrial
- Neighbourhood
- Interactive map of Marquis Industrial
- Coordinates: 52°11′49″N 106°38′17″W
- Country: Canada
- Province: Saskatchewan
- City: Saskatoon
- Suburban Development Area: North Industrial SDA
- Neighbourhood: Marquis Industrial
- Annexed: 1980-1984

Government
  - Type: Municipal (Ward 5)
  - Administrative body: Saskatoon City Council
  - Councillor: Randy Donauer
- Time zone: UTC-6 (CST)

Marquis Industrial is an industrial park located in the North Industrial SDA Suburban Development Area of Saskatoon, Saskatchewan. Industrial parks are usually located close to transport facilities, especially where more than one transport modalities coincide. Highway 11 and Highway 12 are all accessed directly from Marquis Industrial. The Saskatoon John G. Diefenbaker International Airport is west of the Highway 11/12 concurrency along Idylwyld Drive.

== Geography ==
The land was annexed from the rural municipality of Corman Park between 1975 and 1984 and 1990-1994. In 2005 land was annexed for Akzo (Marquis Industrial). The Marquis Industrial subdivision is along two major trucking routes. Highway 11 to Prince Albert via Warman, and Highway 12 to Blaine Lake via Martensville mark the western boundary. Commercial and industrial enterprises along both sides of 71st Street are the northern perimeter of the industrial park.

From the 1980s until recently, the portion of Marquis Industrial east of the rail line and north of the Silverwood Heights community was demarcated as Silverwood Industrial.

== Economy ==
The Marquis Industrial park is a mix of commercial and industrial concerns. Merlin-Ford Lincoln is a car dealership located in the Marquis Industrial area and has not relocated to the auto mall in the Stonegate subdivision. Cover-all Building Systems, Case-New Holland agricultural machinery manufacturer, Peavey Mart, Maple Leaf pork processing facility, Akzo Nobel Chemicals Ltd., Beachcomber Hot Tubs, Centennial Plumbing and Heating are a few of the Marquis Industrial businesses. The Saskatoon Correctional Centre also is located in the Marquis Industrial park. NORAC Systems International Inc. opened their 2.87-acre (11,600 m^{2}) land, $2.5-million industrial plant in 2007.

In the Marquis Industrial subdivision are 1092 full-time employees and 24 part-time employees.

== Transportation ==
Until recently, the area was primarily accessed via Wanuskewein Road and Miller Avenue from the south and north and 71st Street from the west. An extension of Marquis Drive has now provided the region with its major road access, and in 2013 the city approved plans for a north commuter bridge off the east end of Marquis to connect to an extension of McOrmond Drive from the east, providing a major commuter link between Marquis Industrial and the residential communities in northeast and east Saskatoon. The bridge is not, however, being considered a truck route. This new route opened to traffic in the fall of 2018.
