= Hudson Bay Industrial, Saskatoon =

Hudson Bay Industrial
- Neighbourhood
- Interactive map of Hudson Bay Industrial
- Coordinates: 52.180000°N 106.655556°W
- Country: Canada
- Province: Saskatchewan
- City: Saskatoon
- Suburban Development Area: North Industrial SDA
- Neighbourhood: Hudson Bay Industrial

Government
  - Administrative body: Saskatoon City Council
- Time zone: UTC−6 (CST)

Hudson Bay Industrial Saskatoon, Saskatchewan, is in the Northwest section of the North West Industrial SDA. Now named Hudson Bay Industrial, in the early days of the Saskatoon's history, the area between 56th Street and 60th Street was originally to have been Swastika Park. Until the late 1990s, the area was part of the North Industrial subdivision until the City of Saskatoon redesignated the lands north of 51st Street and south of 60th Street with this new name. Hudson Bay Industrial subdivision consists primarily of industrial and retail development.

== Layout ==
60th Street is the northernmost perimeter, and 51st the southernmost. The streets are incremented numerically from 51st to 60th Street and run east and west. Wanuskewin Road and the CNR mark the eastern boundary. Idylwyld Drive delimits the eastern edge.

== History ==
The road names of this industrial subdivision mainly honour pioneers of Saskatoon.

List of Hudson Bay Industrial road names
Lambert Crescent
Faithfull Avenue, Crescent
Miners Avenue
Wells Avenue
Cleveland Avenue
Millar Avenue
Tubby Crescent
English Crescent
Molaro Place

== Retail Sector ==
There are a number of restaurants serving this industrial area lining 51st Street, some of these are A&W Restaurants, Taco Time, Extreme Pita, Boston Pizza, Wendy's, Tim Hortons to name a few. This arterial retail street also hosts shops such as Peavey Mart.

=== See also ===
List of shopping malls in Saskatoon

== Recreation ==
Between Tubby Crescent and English crescent are the Rugby fields

== Transportation ==
Saskatchewan Highway 11, Louis Riel Trail, or Idylwyld Drive connects three main Saskatchewan cities: Regina, Saskatoon and Prince Albert.

=== City Transit ===
- Saskatoon Transit
