= Airport Business Area, Saskatoon =

Airport Business Area
- Neighbourhood
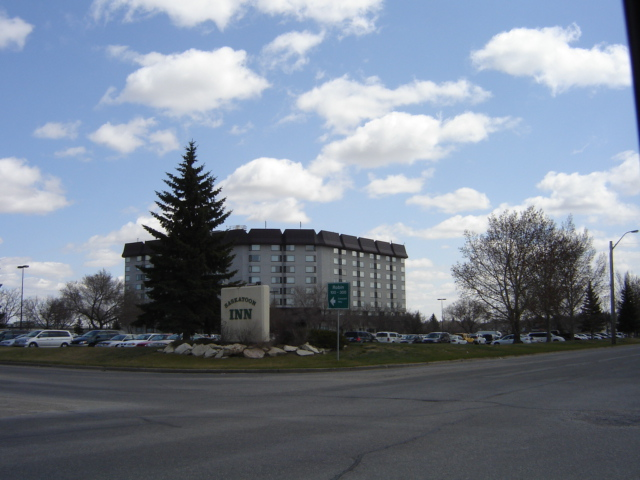
- Saskatoon Inn
- Interactive map of Airport Business Area
- Coordinates: 52°9′29″N 106°40′59″W
- Country: Canada
- Province: Saskatchewan
- City: Saskatoon
- Suburban Development Area: North Industrial SDA
- Neighbourhood: Airport Business Area
- Annexed: 1965-1969

Government
  - Type: Municipal (Ward 5)
  - Administrative body: Saskatoon City Council
  - Councillor: Randy Donauer
- Time zone: UTC-6 (UTC)

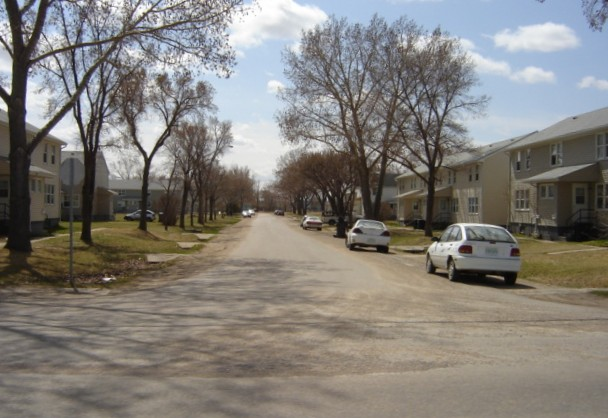
McNab Park residential area prior to demolition

Airport Business Area is an industrial park located in the North Industrial SDA Suburban Development Area of Saskatoon, Saskatchewan. Industrial parks are usually located close to transport facilities, especially where more than one transport modalities coincide. The Idylwyld Drive North, Sk Hwy 11 Louis Riel Trail, and Sk Hwy 12 concurrency are all accessed directly from the Airport Business Area. The Saskatoon John G. Diefenbaker International Airport is north of the Airport Business Area. Circle Drive marks the southern boundary, with access to SK Hwy 14 and Sk Hwy 16, the Yellowhead Trans Canada.

== Geography ==
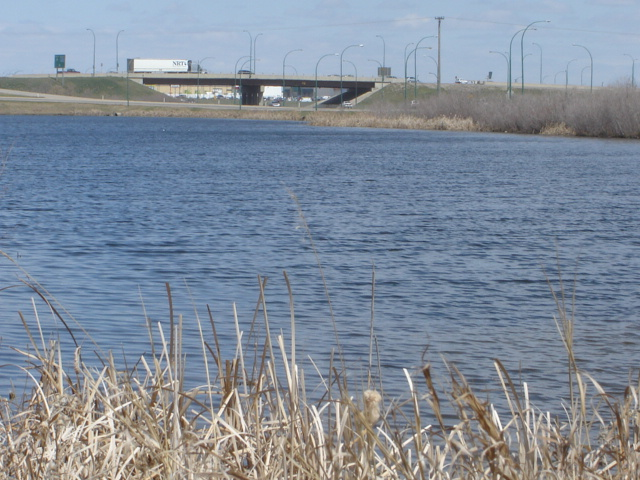
Hudson Bay Slough, Idylwyld Drive Parclo Interchange in distance. Airport Business Area, Saskatoon, Saskatchewan

The land was annexed from the rural municipality of Corman Park between 1965 and 1969. The Airport Business subdivision is several major trucking routes. The Idylwyld Drive North, Sk Hwy 11 Louis Riel Trail to Prince Albert via Warman, and Sk Hwy 12 to Blaine Lake via Martensville concurrency mark the eastern boundary. Circle Drive marks the southern boundary, with access to SK Hwy 14 and Sk Hwy 16, the Yellowhead Trans Canada. It is a main thoroughfare through the city connecting Regina, Saskatoon and Prince Albert, Saskatchewan. It also connects west Saskatoon with the bedroom communities of Warman and Martensville.

The area includes the western end of the Hudson Bay Slough, a water feature that used to dominate the northern end of Saskatoon. Much of the slough has been drained for development, but a large remnant has been preserved east of Avenue C and north of 45th Street as part of RCAF Memorial Park.

=== McNab Park - Airport Industrial - Larkhaven ===
Until the early 2000s, the Airport Business Area consisted of three separate districts:

McNab Park, a small residential community that served as military housing until the 1960s when Saskatoon's airport ceased to double as an air base, and continued to be used for low-cost housing until the early 2010s;

Airport Industrial, a business/commercial park that developed east of the airport and east of McNab Park beginning in the 1970s;

Lark Haven (alternately spelled Larkhaven), another business park that developed south of McNab Park in the early 1980s.

The Airport Business Area also includes the Hampton Village Business Park, located west of the Lake Haven section and east of Hampton Village and under development as of 2021.

An oddity to the area is Lark Place. This street has been shown on maps as a street that crossed at the intersection of Circle Drive and Airport Drive since the mid-1980s. Despite it still appearing on maps, Lark Place is considered a paper street with no plans for it to be developed in the near future.

McNab Park was decommissioned as a residential area in the early 2010s and all structures were demolished by early 2012 (its school was closed and demolished in the early 1980s); it is now being redeveloped as a business park (including several hotels), with a new street layout and new street names allocated. It remains to be seen if the longstanding street names in the area (Jeremy, Maney, etc.) are reassigned to other communities.

== Economy ==
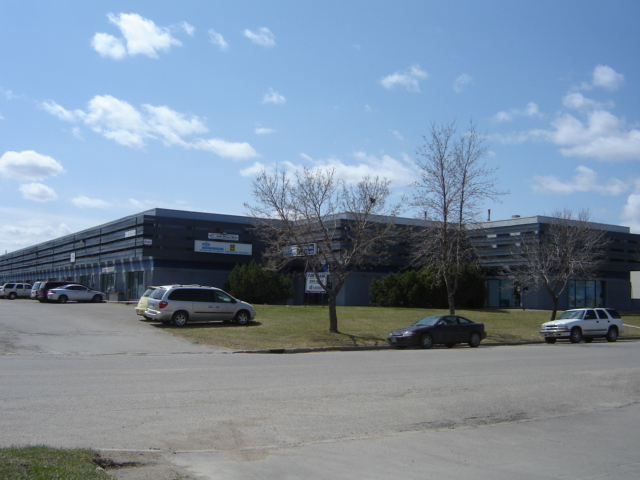
Saskatoon Airport Business Area.

The Airport Business Area park is a mix of commercial and industrial concerns south east of the Saskatoon John G. Diefenbaker International Airport. Areva NC (formerly named COGEMA resources), R.C.A.F. Memorial Park, Saskatoon Machine Works, Shaw Communications, Global Television are businesses based in the airport business park. Saskatoon Inn, Heritage Inn, Travelodge, Mainstay, Courtyard Marriot, Hampton Inn & Suites by Hilton, Sandman Hotel and Country Inn and Suites are next to the airport for the travelling business person. Saskatoon Hyundai and Auto Clearing are auto dealerships which make their home base in the Airport Business Area.

In the Airport Business Area subdivision are 3374 full-time employees and 841 part-time employees.

== Future plans ==
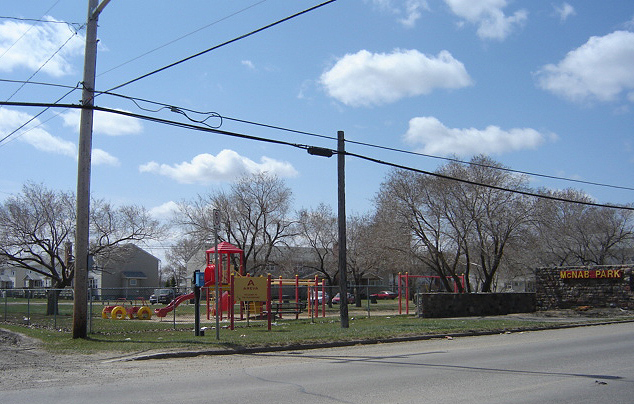
McNab Park Airport Business Area Saskatoon Sk

The airport business area is a part of the local area plans of the City of Saskatoon infrastructure development. Some of the upcoming plans are to structure Airport Drive as a "Gateway to Saskatoon", and the residential component at McNab Park was removed prior to 2011, with the area now being revamped for light industrial and business park uses. Other plans include renaming the area to Airport Business Area from Airport Industrial Area, and incorporating the proposed Hampton Industrial area within Airport Business Area. Development of the area west of Airport Drive and northwest of Circle Drive and reserving the Larkhaven Park formation as a park space are also in the plans. However plans as of late 2017 call for Aerogreen Road to be extended south from Cynthia Street, which will bisect the park; the same plans also show a major commercial development earmarked for the intersection of Claypool Drive and McClocklin Road.
