= Lawson Sector =

- Sector
- Interactive map of Lawson Sector
- Coordinates: 52°9′50″N 106°38′10″W
- Country: Canada
- Province: Saskatchewan
- City: Saskatoon

Area
  - Water: 0 km^{2} (0 sq mi) 0%

Population (2021)
  - Total: 34,620
- projected 2010
- Area code: Area code 306

Lawson Sector, previously known as Lawson Suburban Development Area (SDA), is a sector in Saskatoon, Saskatchewan, Canada. It is a part of the west side community of Saskatoon. It generally lies south and east of the Riel Industrial Sector, west of the South Saskatchewan River and the University Heights Sector, and north of the Core Neighbourhoods Sector.

== Neighbourhoods ==
- Central Industrial
- Kelsey-Woodlawn
- Lawson Heights
- Lawson Heights Urban Centre
- Mayfair
- North Park
- Richmond Heights
- River Heights
- Silverwood Heights

== Recreation facilities ==
- Lawson Civic Centre
- Saskatoon Kinsmen / Henk Ruys Soccer Centre – Indoor Facility
- Umea Park Soccer Field
- Umea Vast Park Soccer Field

== Shopping ==
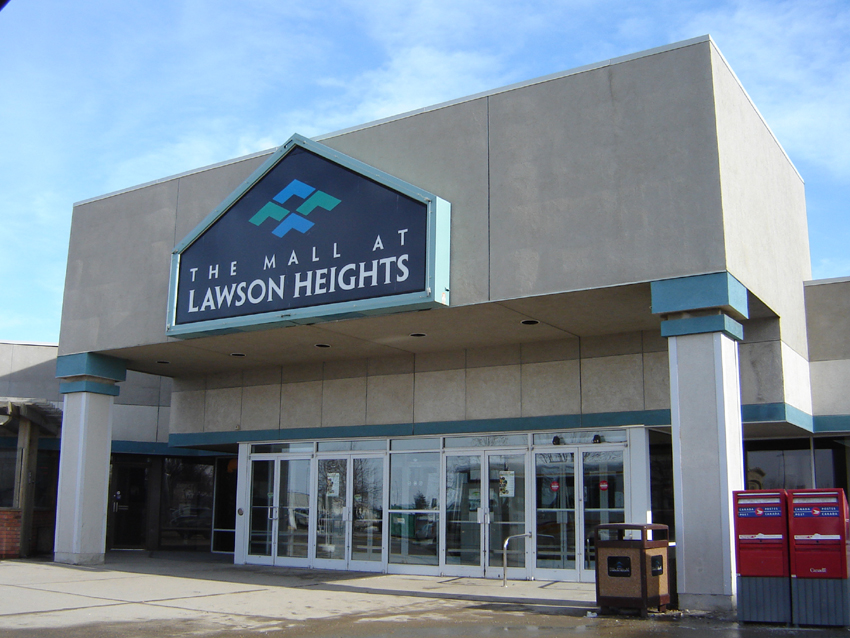
Lawson Heights Mall (formerly The Mall at Lawson Heights) Lawson Heights Urban Centre

- Lawson Heights Mall

== Education ==
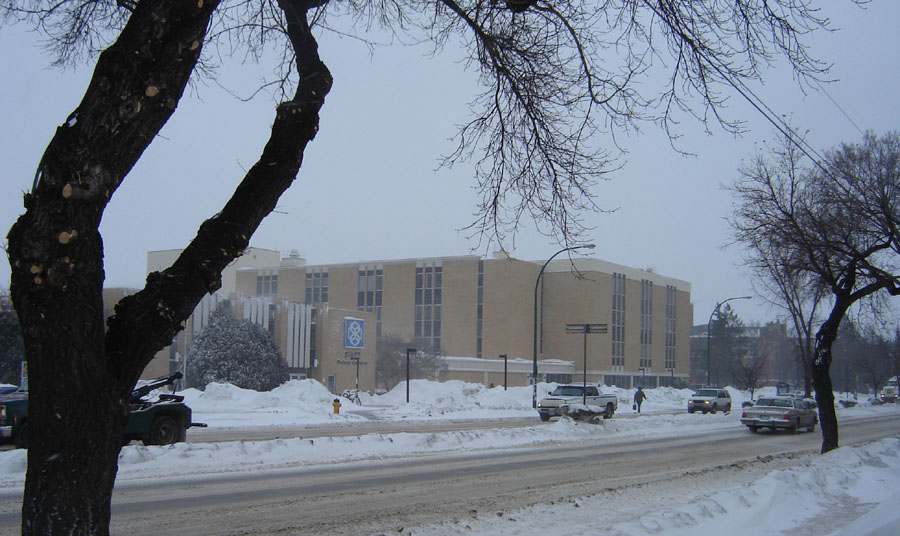
Kelsey campus of SIAST. Central Industrial

Lawson Sector is home to the following schools:

=== Separate education ===
==== Secondary schools ====
- Bishop James Mahoney High School

==== Elementary schools ====
- St. George School
- St. Michael School
- École St. Paul School
- St. Anne School
- St. Angela School
- Sister O'Brien School

=== Public education ===
==== Secondary schools ====
- Marion M. Graham Collegiate

==== Elementary schools ====
- Lawson Heights School
- École River Heights School
- Mayfair School
- North Park Wilson School
- Brownell School
- Silverwood Heights School

== Library ==
- Rusty Macdonald Branch Library
- Hector Trout Manor

== Transportation ==
Warman Road is the main north-south arterial through Lawson Sector, while Idylwyld Drive and Circle Drive pass through the southern portion of the sector.

=== City transit ===
The following routes service the area, all meeting at the bus terminal at Lawson Heights Mall.

- 12 River Heights – Stonebridge
- 13 Lawson – Exhibition
- 14 North Industrial – City Centre
- 70 Lawson Heights – Silverspring
- 80 Silverwood Heights – Erindale/Arbor Creek
