= River Heights, Saskatoon =

River Heights
- Neighbourhood
- Interactive map of River Heights
- Coordinates: 52°9′45″N 106°37′41″W
- Country: Canada
- Province: Saskatchewan
- City: Saskatoon
- Suburban Development Area: Lawson Suburban Development Area

Government
  - Type: Municipal (Ward 5)
  - Administrative body: Saskatoon City Council
  - Councillor: Randy Donauer

Population (2006)
  - Total: 4,385
  - Average Income: $90,089
- Time zone: UTC-6 (CST)
- Area code: Area code 306
- Website: River Heights Community Association

River Heights is a neighbourhood in Lawson Suburban Development Area, Saskatoon, Saskatchewan. Its eastern boundary borders the South Saskatchewan River. The suburb is just south of the Lawson Heights Mall. Development of the neighbourhood began in the very early 1960s (it appears on the official 1961 City of Saskatoon street map, though an issue involving restrictions on mortgage funds delayed its initial development, and by August 1967 only a small portion of the community had been developed), with full build out completed by the early 1980s. Most of the neighbourhood's land was annexed by the city in the late 1950s, with the eastern third of the district annexed in 1974. As a community name, River Heights predates the development by half a century, appearing on the May 1912 "Saskatoon and Environs" map that sketched out future development for the young city; at the time, the name was attached to a community in the current location of Montgomery Place.

== Demographics ==
The River Heights suburb has a population of 4,385 residents with an average household size of 2.6 people. The family income is on average $90,089. Approximately 76.9% of all residents own their own homes.

== Education ==
École River Heights School
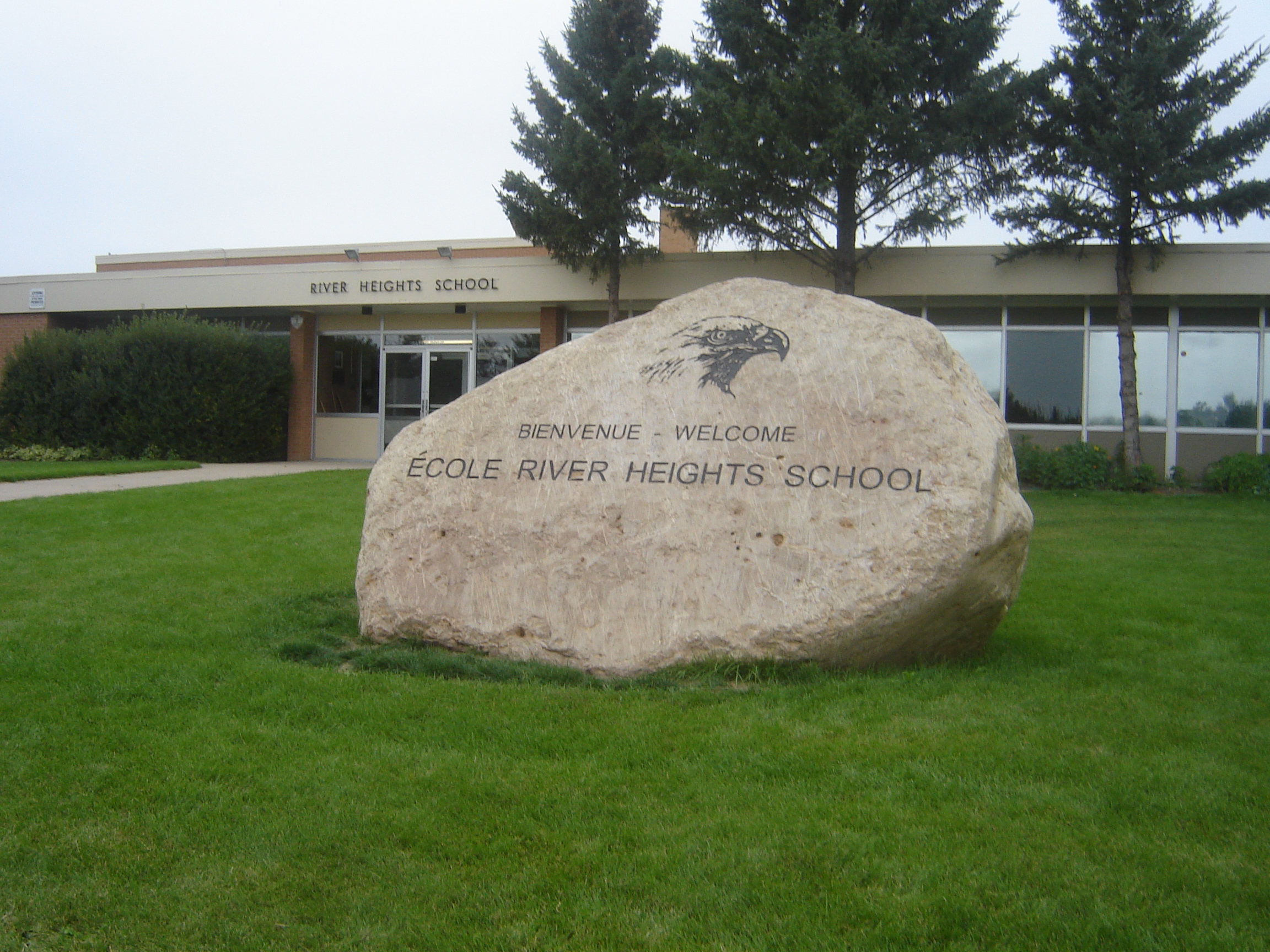
- 60 Ravine Drive; Saskatoon, Saskatchewan, S7K 1E2; Canada

Information
- Type: Elementary
- School board: Saskatoon Public School Division
- Principal: Sherry McConnell
- Grades: Pre-Kindergarten to Grade 8
- Enrollment: 416 (2017)
- Education system: Public
- Language: English, French
- Feeder to: Marion M. Graham Collegiate
- Website: École River Heights School

St. Anne School
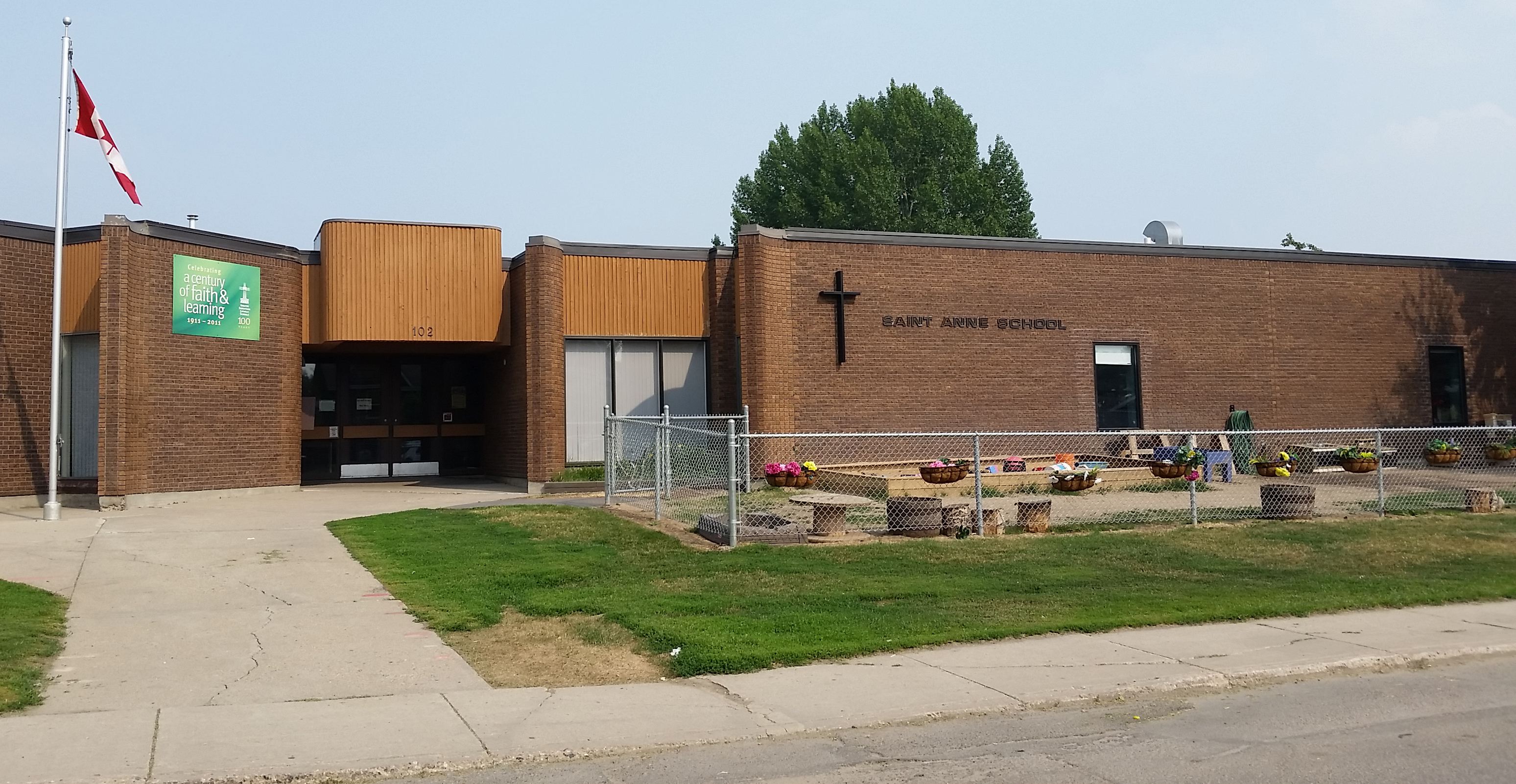
- 102 Ravine Court; Saskatoon, Saskatchewan, S7K 4H6; Canada

Information
- Type: Elementary
- Religious affiliation: Catholic
- Opened: 1976
- School board: Greater Saskatoon Catholic Schools
- Principal: Chad Gusikoski
- Grades: Kindergarten to Grade 8
- Enrollment: 188 (2017)
- Education system: Separate
- Language: English
- Feeder to: Bishop James Mahoney High School
- Website: St. Anne School

- École River Heights School - public, French immersion elementary, part of the Saskatoon Public School Division
- St. Anne School - separate (Catholic) elementary, part of Greater Saskatoon Catholic Schools

== Government and politics ==
River Heights exists within the federal electoral district of Saskatoon—University. It is currently represented by Corey Tochor of the Conservative Party of Canada, first elected in 2019.

Provincially, the area is within the constituency of Saskatoon Meewasin. It is currently represented by Ryan Meili of the Saskatchewan New Democratic Party, first elected in a 2017 by-election.

In Saskatoon's non-partisan municipal politics, River Heights lies within ward 5. It is currently represented by Randy Donauer, first elected in 2010.

== Commercial ==
Within River Heights itself, the only commercial development is at or adjacent to the Canarama Shopping Centre strip mall, which was built in the late 1970s at the intersection of Assiniboine Drive and Warman Road. The community boundaries, however, abut the Lawson Heights Mall and associated commercial to the north, commercial development off Circle Drive to the west and additional commercial on Pinehouse Drive, also to the north of River Heights.

== Public services ==
SaskEnergy provides electrical utilities to all Saskatoon neighbourhoods which existed after 1958. Water is treated and supplied by the City of Saskatoon Water and Wastewater Treatment Branch. There are health professional offices in the central business district, such as physician, dentist, optometric services. The three Saskatoon hospitals are located in other nearby neighbourhoods. St. Paul's Hospital is located in Pleasant Hill, Royal University Hospital is located in the University of Saskatchewan Land Management area, and Saskatoon City Hospital is located in City Park. The Northwest Division oversees the neighbourhoods on Saskatoon's west side surrounding the Central Division. The River Heights subdivision is served by the City of Saskatoon Saskatoon Fire & Protective Services.
