= Lawson Heights, Saskatoon =

Lawson Heights
- Neighbourhood
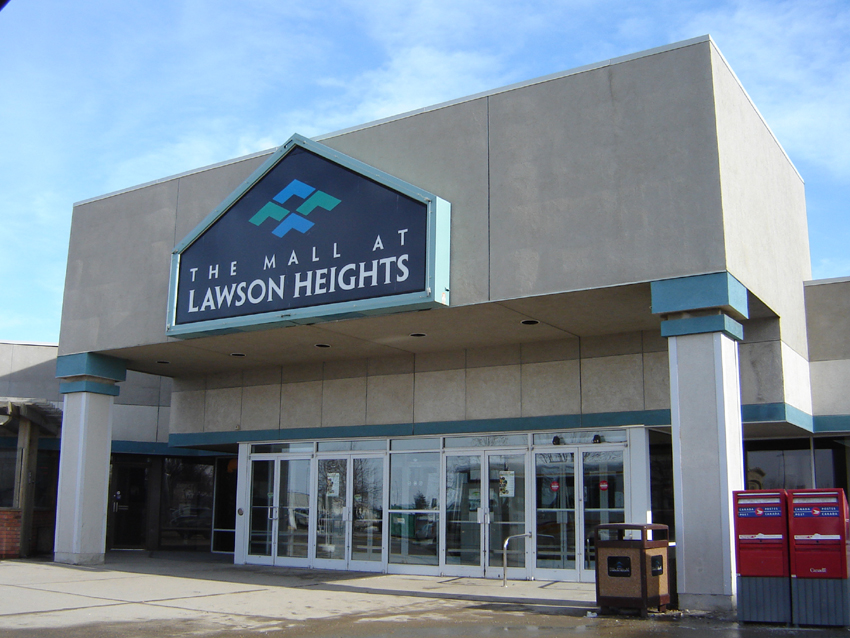
- Lawson Heights Mall (formerly The Mall at Lawson Heights)
- Interactive map of Lawson Heights
- Coordinates: 52°10′16″N 106°37′10″W
- Country: Canada
- Province: Saskatchewan
- City: Saskatoon
- Suburban Development Area: Lawson Suburban Development Area
- Neighbourhood: Lawson Heights

Government
  - Type: Municipal (Ward 5)
  - Administrative body: Saskatoon City Council
  - Councillor: Randy Donauer

Area
  - Total: 1.485 km^{2} (0.573 sq mi)

Population (2006)
  - Total: 4,815
  - Density: 3,242/km^{2} (8,398/sq mi)
  - Average Income: $78,130
- Time zone: UTC-6 (CST)

Lawson Heights is a residential neighbourhood located in northern Saskatoon, Saskatchewan, which was developed beginning in the late 1970s.

== History ==
Lawson Heights takes its name from Reverend Stephen George Lawson who homesteaded in the area (northeast quarter of section 10 Township 37 Range 5 West of the 3rd Meridian). He had come from Prince Edward Island and was a Presbyterian minister.

Construction on Lawson Heights began in the late 1970s and was considered completed by the end of 1980s. The average family size is 2.7 with homeownership at 64.6%. The average home selling price in 2006 was $256,013.

== Location ==
Within the Lawson Suburban Development Area (West Side), the neighbourhood of Lawson Heights is bounded to the north by Lenore Drive. It is basically triangular in shape. Primrose Drive is to the west. Pinehouse Drive is on the southern edge. Whiteswan Drive provides a scenic drive along the eastern edge, which borders upon the Meewasin Park on the river bank of the South Saskatchewan River.

== Recreation ==
- Saskatoon Kinsmen / Henk Ruys Soccer Centre.
- Lawson Civic Centre opened in 1989 in conjunction with the
  - Saskatoon's first wave pool
  - Tropical beach-like pool where the water starts at 0 and tapers off until finally reaching a depth of 6 feet (2 m).
  - Water features such as whirlpool and toddlers' pool
  - Multipurpose room
  - Indoor playground
  - Fitness room
  - Poolside deck
  - Outdoor park area

== Street naming ==
All the neighbourhood roads are crescents which connect back to the main thoroughfares. The streets are named after Saskatchewan lakes, and was the first of three neighbourhoods in the city to do this:

- Candle Court, Crescent, Way, Place
- Chitek Court, Terrace, Crescent
- Cochin Terrace, Crescent, Place, Way
- Cypress Court
- Dore Way, Crescent
- Frobisher Court, Crescent, Way, Place
- La Loche Road, Place, Court, Terrace
- Lenore Drive
- Manitou Court
- Nokomis Bay, Crescent, Place, Terrace
- Pinehouse Drive, Place
- Primrose Drive
- Quill Court, Bay, Crescent
- Redberry Road
- Reindeer Road
- Tobin Terrace, Crescent, Place, Way
- Turtle Court, Crescent, Place
- Wathaman Terrace, Crescent, Place, Way

== Government and politics ==
Lawson Heights exists within the federal electoral district of Saskatoon—University. It is currently represented by Corey Tochor of the Conservative Party of Canada, first elected in 2019.

Provincially, the area is within the constituency of Saskatoon Northwest. It is currently represented by Gordon Wyant of the Saskatchewan Party, first elected in a 2010 by-election.

In Saskatoon's non-partisan municipal politics, Lawson Heights lies within ward 5. It is currently represented by Randy Donauer, first elected in a 2010 by-election.

== Library ==
- One of the nine branches of Saskatoon Public Library locations established, The Rusty MacDonald Branch Library located in the Lawson Civic Centre celebrated its grand opening in 1989.

== Education ==
Lawson Heights School
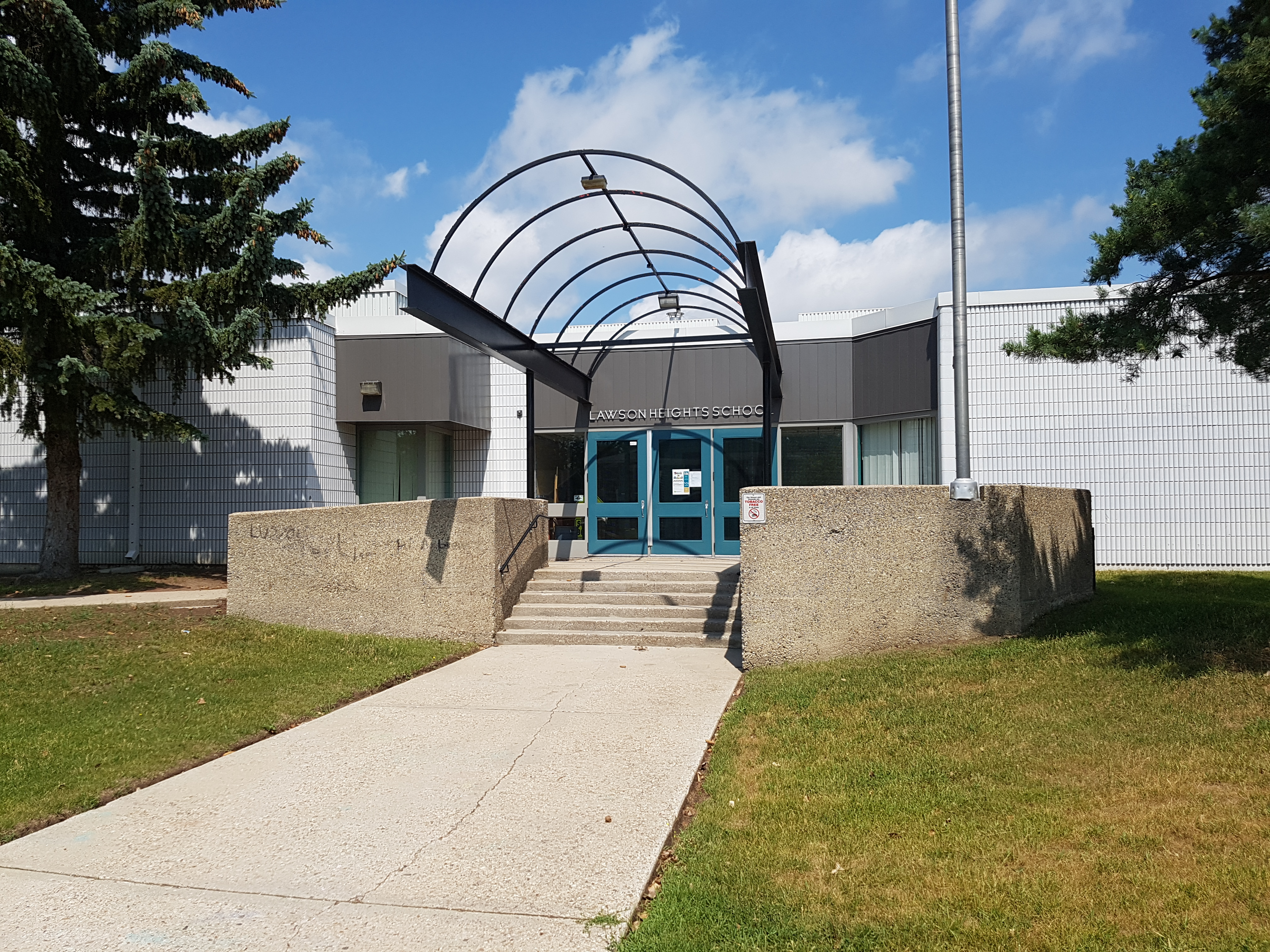

Location
- 430 Redberry Road; Saskatoon, Saskatchewan, S7K 5H6; Canada

Information
- Type: Elementary
- School board: Saskatoon Public School Division
- Principal: Jennifer Brokofsky
- Enrollment: 190 (2017)
- Education system: Public
- Language: English
- Feeder to: Marion M. Graham Collegiate
- Website: Lawson Heights School

St. George School
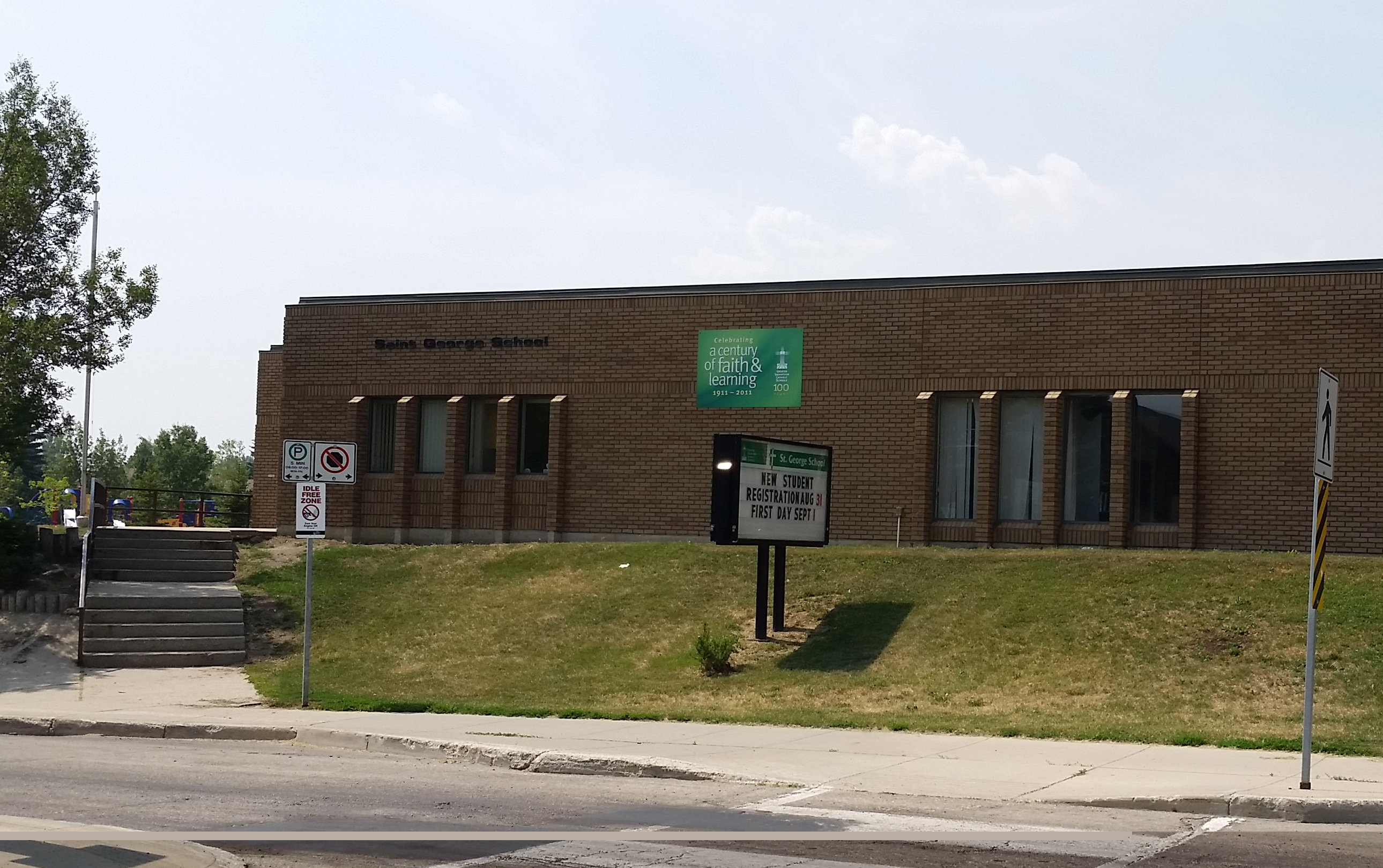

Location
- 748 Redberry Road; Saskatoon, Saskatchewan, S7K 5H3; Canada

Information
- Type: Elementary
- Religious affiliation: Catholic
- Opened: 1979
- School board: Greater Saskatoon Catholic Schools
- Principal: Renee Cratty
- Grades: Kindergarten to Grade 8
- Enrollment: 221 (2017)
- Education system: Separate
- Language: English
- Feeder to: Bishop James Mahoney High School
- Website: St. George School

- Bishop James Mahoney High School - separate (Catholic) secondary, part of Greater Saskatoon Catholic Schools
- Christian Centre Academy
- Lawson Heights School - public elementary, part of the Saskatoon Public School Division
- St. George School - separate (Catholic) elementary, part of Greater Saskatoon Catholic Schools

== Economy ==
- Technically Lawson Heights Mall, a nearby amenity, is located to the west in the Lawson Heights Suburban Centre, and the suburban centre includes additional commercial development along Primrose and Pinehouse Drive. Within Lawson Heights itself, there is no actual commercial development.

== Area Parks ==
- Rochdale Park 19.23 acres (77,800 m^{2})
- Umea Park, though located in three separate sections within the Lawson Heights Suburban Centre, is also considered an area amenity for residents of Lawson Heights.

== Transportation ==
=== City Transit ===
Lawson Heights is serviced by City Transit Bus RoutesSaskatoon Transit.

=== Potential bridge crossing ===
In February 2019, the City of Saskatoon called for design ideas for a potential river crossing that would primarily carry a sewer line but also be available for non-motorized users (pedestrians and cyclists). The study area for the bridge encompassed from just north of Pinehouse Drive in Lawson Heights to the southern boundary of the wastewater treatment plant in Silverwood Heights, and the proposed bridge linking Whiteswan Drive to the eastern shore of the South Saskatchewan River near the original alignment of Central Avenue north of Fedoruk Drive. Although originally proposed for completion by 2021, as of 2021 no construction has occurred.

== Life ==
Lawson Heights Community Association operates several sports and recreation programs at Lawson Heights and St. George Schools, Marion M. Graham Collegiate, Bishop James Mahoney High School, and local parks.

== See also ==
- Lawson Heights Suburban Centre, Saskatoon, Saskatchewan
