= Kelsey-Woodlawn, Saskatoon =

Kelsey-Woodlawn
- Neighbourhood
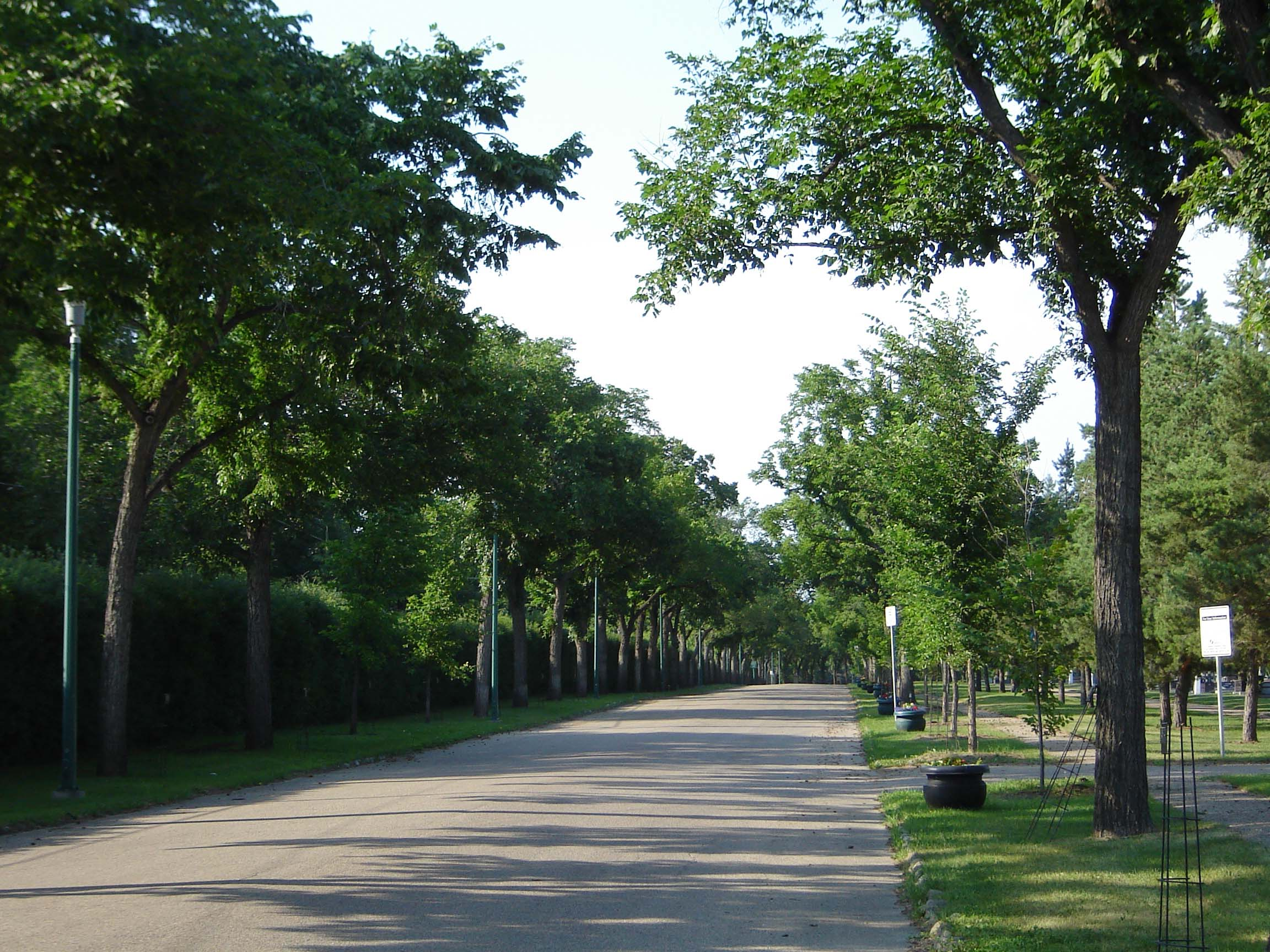
- The Next of Kin Memorial Avenue at Woodlawn Cemetery Saskatoon
- Interactive map of Kelsey-Woodlawn
- Coordinates: 52°09′03″N 106°39′18″W
- Country: Canada
- Province: Saskatchewan
- City: Saskatoon
- Suburban Development Area: Lawson SDA

Government
  - Type: Municipal (Ward 1)
  - Administrative body: Saskatoon City Council
  - Councillor: Darren Hill

Population (2005)
  - Total: 860
- Time zone: UTC-6 (CST)

Kelsey-Woodlawn is a combination of industrial park nestled between the North West Industrial SDA and the Central Industrial of down town Saskatoon. It is still serviced by the CNR rail lines to both the north and east. There are two older neighbourhoods, one still survives near SIAST - Kelsey institute on Idylwyld Drive North, and the other is the McVicar Addition near the Woodlawn Cemetery.

== Location ==
Within the Lawson Suburban Development Area (West Side), the Kelsey-Woodlawn neighbourhood spans as far north as the north industrial area bearing 40th Street as its northern perimeter. The CNR train track marks the eastern boundary at Warman Road, thus encompassing the Woodlawn Cemetery. The southernmost road within Kelsey-Woodlawn is 33rd Street East, and the western edge includes all the places along Idylwyld Drive. Most homes were built prior to the 1960s with no new construction virtually after 1980 at all and the main tenants would be students attending SIAST on 33rd Street and Idylwyld Drive.

== Layout ==
Along the Woodlawn Cemetery is a small neighbourhood known as the "McVicar Addition" The other residential community in the Kelsey Woodlawn subdivision are those who reside in the places which branch off Idylwyld Drive. These places are named after governors general of Canada.

Throughout the remainder of the area, the streets are numerically numbered from 33rd Street and continue north to 40th Street. The avenues are named after the provinces of Canada.

List of Places and Avenues
Location	Namesake
Connaught Place	Duke of Connaught
Grey Place	Earl Grey
Aberdeen Place	Lord Aberdeen
Minto Place	Earl of Minto
Stanley Place	Lord Stanley of Preston
Saskatchewan Avenue	Saskatchewan
Alberta Avenue	Alberta
Quebec Avenue	Quebec
Ontario Avenue	Ontario

== History ==
The Wood Lawn Cemetery is the only active municipal cemetery within city limits. It replaced the first cemetery - Nutana Pioneer Cemetery in 1910.

Next of Kin Memorial Avenue is bedecked with many planted trees honoring those who gave the ultimate sacrifice in war engagements. This Road of Remembrance was designated in 1993 as a National Historic Site.

== Government and politics ==
Kelsey-Woodlawn exists within the federal electoral district of Saskatoon West. It is currently represented by Brad Redekopp of the Conservative Party of Canada, first elected in 2019.

Provincially, the area is within the constituency of Saskatoon Meewasin. It is currently represented by Nathaniel Teed of the Saskatchewan New Democratic Party, first elected in a 2017 by-election.

In Saskatoon's non-partisan municipal politics, Kelsey-Woodlawn lies within ward 1. It is currently represented by Darren Hill, first elected in 2006.

== Education ==
St. Michael Community School
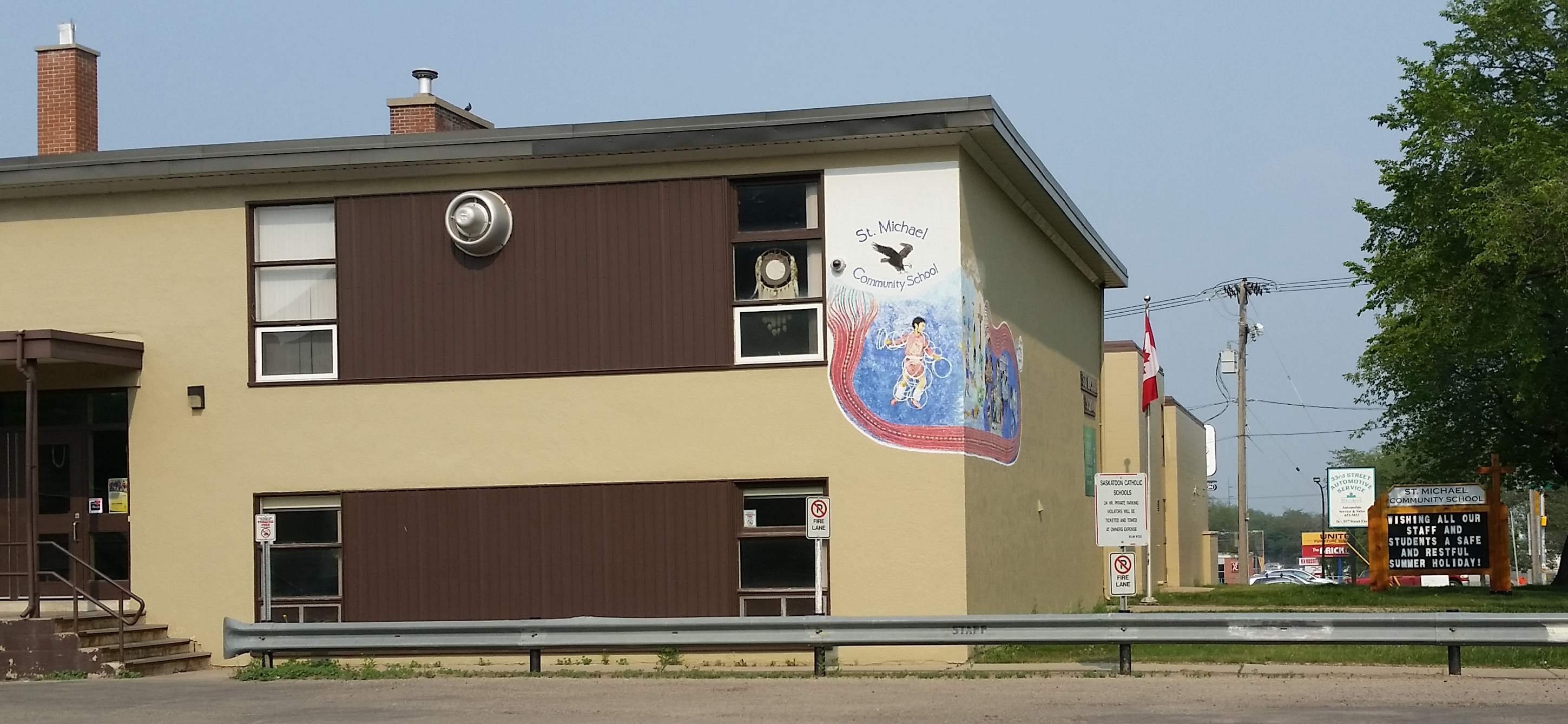

Location
- 22 - 33rd Street East; Saskatoon, Saskatchewan, S7K 0R7; Canada

Information
- Type: Elementary
- Religious affiliation: Catholic
- Opened: 1951
- School board: Greater Saskatoon Catholic Schools
- Principal: Cristin Dorgan-Lee
- Grades: Pre-Kindergarten to Grade 8
- Enrollment: 132 (2017)
- Education system: Separate
- Language: English
- Feeder to: E. D. Feehan High School
- Website: St. Michael Community School

- St. Michael Community School - separate (Catholic) elementary, part of Greater Saskatoon Catholic Schools

== Shopping ==
Within Kelsey-Woodlawn are industrial areas interspersed with the residential areas. The business and industrial areas stem off the Central Business District Warehouse area. The CNR rail yards were first located down town, and there are still CPR spur lines throughout the Kelsey Woodlawn Subdivision. Shopping is available at several various strip malls along Idylwyld Drive North, Quebec Avenue and 33rd Street East.

== Area Parks ==
- Dr. J. Valens Park 2.10 acres (8,500 m^{2})
- Industrial Park 6.00 acres (24,300 m^{2})

== Transportation ==
Idylwyld Drive has had many titles: Avenue A, Highway 11 and most currently Louis Riel Trail. It is a main thoroughfare through the city connecting Regina, Saskatoon and Prince Albert, Saskatchewan. It also connects west Saskatoon with the bedroom communities of Warman and Martensville

=== City Transit ===
Kelsey-Woodlawn serviced by City Transit Bus Routes Saskatoon Transit.
