= Spadina Crescent Bridge (Saskatoon) =

Bridge in Saskatoon, Saskatchewan, Canada

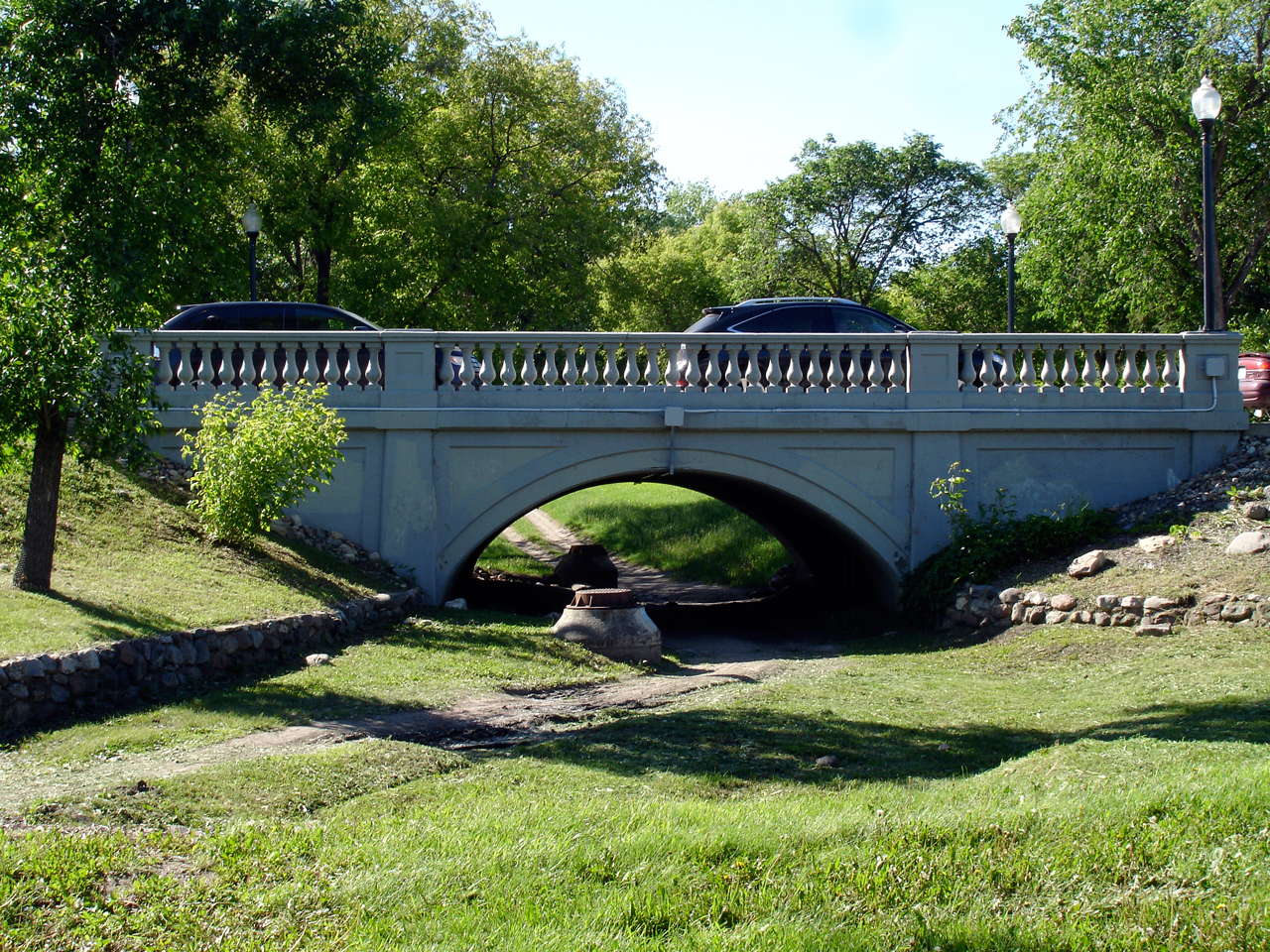
- Spadina Crescent Bridge
- Coordinates: 52°8′9″N 106°38′54″W
- Carries: 2 lanes of Spadina Crescent
- Crosses: Ravine in City Park, Saskatoon
- Locale: Saskatoon, Saskatchewan, Canada
- Official name: Spadina Crescent Bridge
- Maintained by: City of Saskatoon

Characteristics
- Design: Deck arch bridge
- Material: Steel, concrete
- No. of spans: 1
- Piers in water: 0

History
- Construction end: 1930

Location
- Interactive map of Spadina Crescent Bridge

Spadina Crescent Bridge is a deck arch bridge that spans a ravine in City Park along Spadina Crescent in Saskatoon, Saskatchewan, Canada.

The bridge was constructed in 1930, replacing an earlier wooden structure. It was built by the Saskatoon Contracting Co., owned by Leon and Paul Prescesky. In 1933, a series of ponds were dug in the ravine as a Depression-era relief project, meant to beautify "Central Park", as the area was known as then. The pond system was extended in the 1950s, but has since been filled in. The remaining ravine still serves as an outlet for storm water.

== See also ==
- List of bridges in Canada
- List of bridges
