= City Park, Saskatoon =

City Park
- Neighbourhood
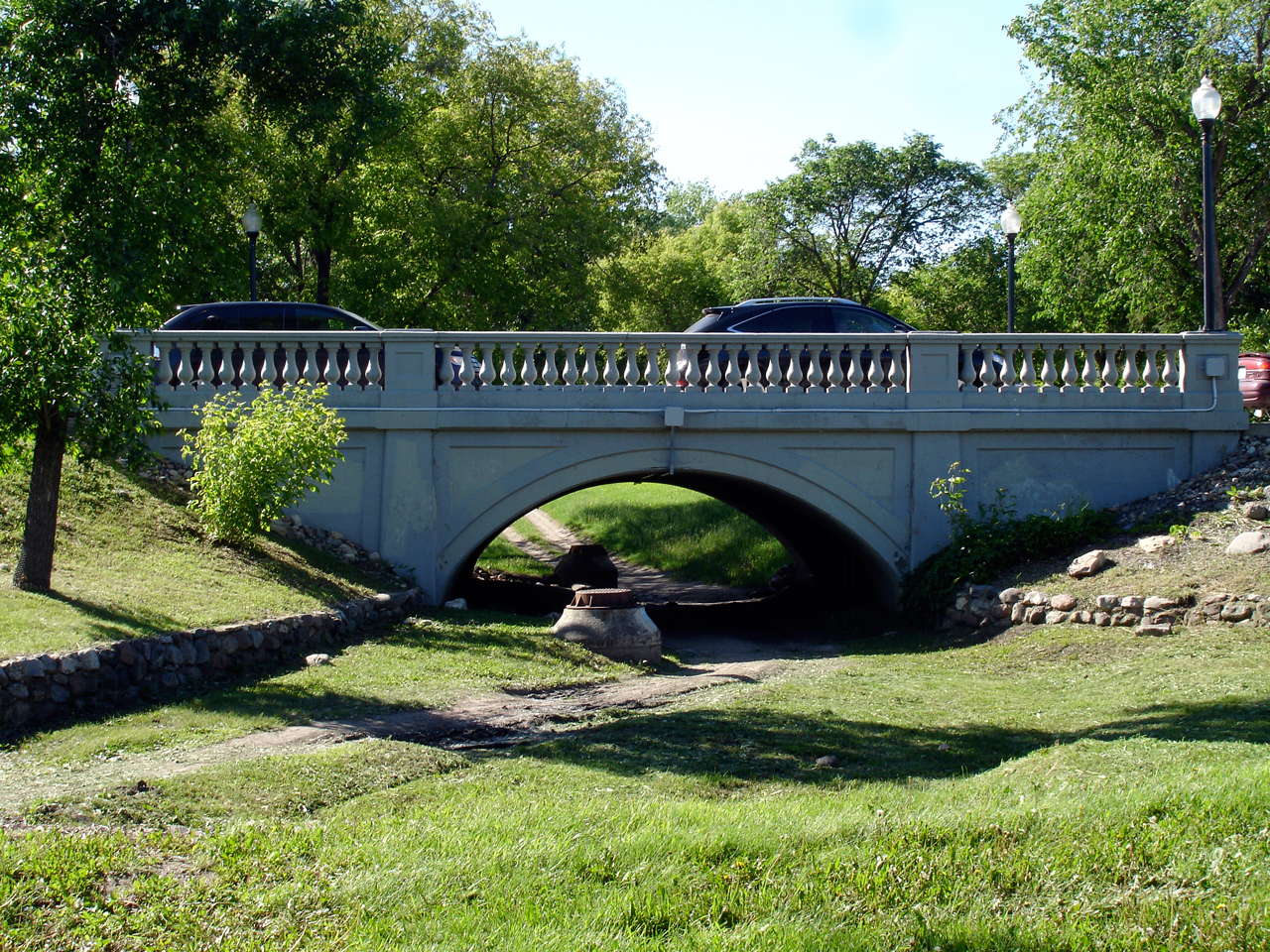
- Spadina Crescent Bridge

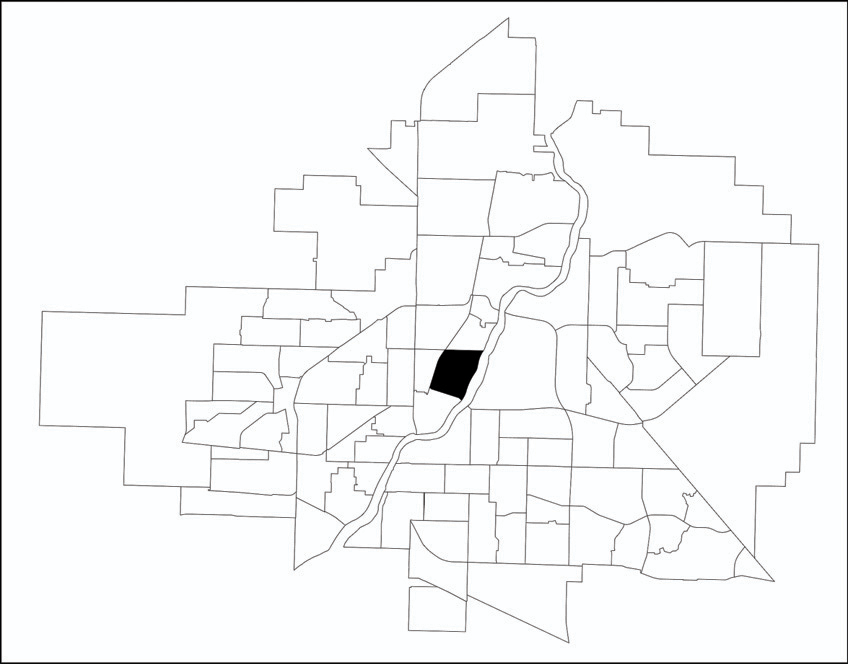
- City Park location map
- Coordinates: 52°8′8″N 106°39′12″W
- Country: Canada
- Province: Saskatchewan
- City: Saskatoon
- Suburban Development Area: Core Neighbourhoods
- Neighbourhood: City Park
- Construction: 1946-1960

Government
  - Type: Municipal (Ward 1)
  - Administrative body: Saskatoon City Council
  - Councillor: Darren Hill

Area
  - Total: 1.39 km^{2} (0.54 sq mi)

Population (2009)
  - Total: 4,405
  - Density: 3,170/km^{2} (8,210/sq mi)
  - Average Income: $42,236
- Time zone: UTC-6 (CST)
- Website: City Park Community Association

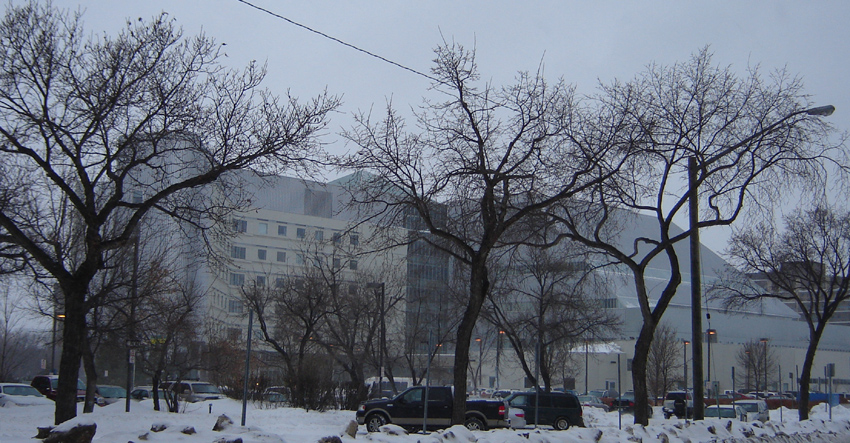
Saskatoon City Hospital

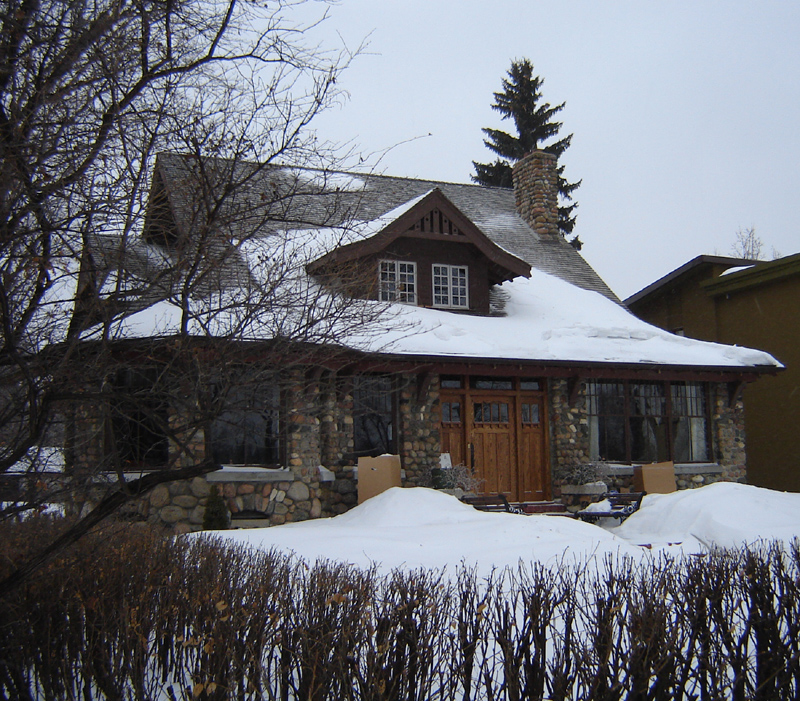
Alexander House, a municipal heritage property

City Park is a mixed-use neighbourhood located near the center of Saskatoon, Saskatchewan, Canada. It comprises a mix of single-family detached homes, apartment buildings and other semi-detached dwellings. It also contains a number of commercial zones with businesses. As of 2009, the area was home to 4,405 residents. The neighbourhood is considered a middle-income area, with an average family income of $42,236, an average dwelling value of $245,254 and a home ownership rate of 28.6%.

== History ==
City Park was originally known as Central Park and first had a golf course. In 1903, the annual exhibition was moved from the Louise Grounds in Nutana to City Park, and a horse racing track and grandstand were constructed. By 1910, the exhibition had moved to its permanent home in the city's south end. The outline of the old racetrack can still be seen in what is now Kinsmen Park.

City Park was one of the first areas annexed by the city after its incorporation in 1906. The Alexander Residence, built in 1912 on Spadina Crescent, was named for Dr. Harold E. and Edith Alexander, who owned the house from 1916 to 1946. It is one of the city's most notable examples of pre-World War I Arts and Crafts architecture. It was designated a municipal heritage property on May 12, 2001.

== Government and politics ==
City Park exists within the federal electoral district of Saskatoon West. It is currently represented by Sheri Benson of the New Democratic Party, first elected in 2015.

Provincially, the area is within the constituency of Saskatoon Meewasin. It is currently represented by Ryan Meili of the Saskatchewan New Democratic Party, first elected in a 2017 by-election.

In Saskatoon's non-partisan municipal politics, City Park lies within ward 1. It is currently represented by Darren Hill, first elected in 2006.

== Institutions ==
=== Education ===
City Park School
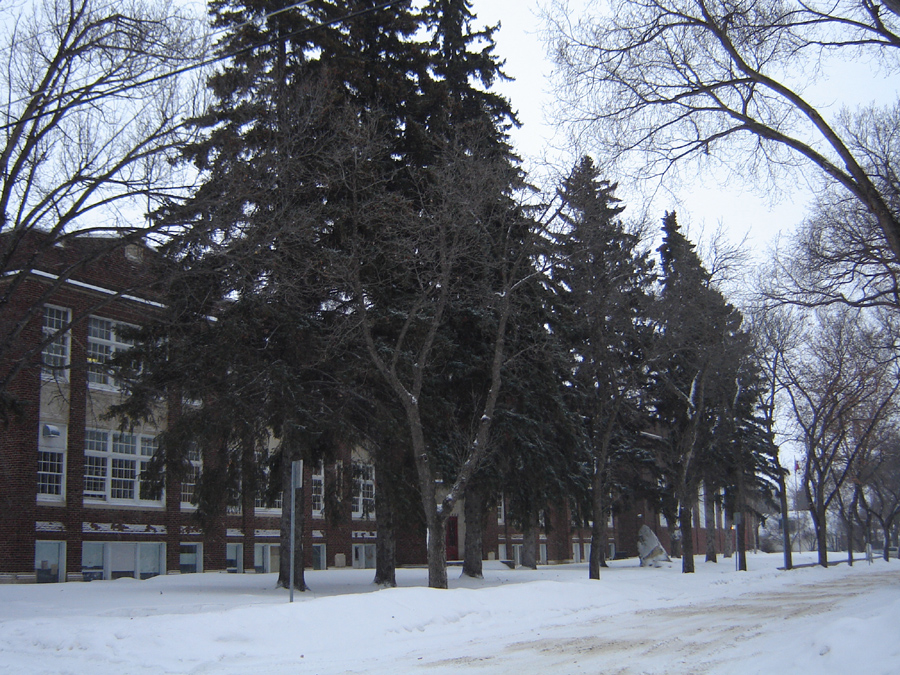

Location
- 820 9th Avenue North; Saskatoon, Saskatchewan, S7K 2Z2; Canada; 52.140225°N 106.648599°W

Information
- Former name: City Park Collegiate
- Type: Elementary
- Motto: Work, Community, Self, Family
- Opened: 1986
- School board: Saskatoon Public Schools
- Principal: Shanna Strueby
- Grades: Kindergarten to Grade 8
- Enrollment: 264 (2017)
- Education system: Public
- Language: English
- Colours: Purple, Silver and Black
- Team name: Eagles
- Website: City Park School

- City Park School - a K-8 school operated by Saskatoon Public Schools. Originally opened as City Park Collegiate in 1929, it served as a mainstream high school from its opening until 1984 when it closed as a result of the opening of Marion M. Graham Collegiate in the city's Silverwood Heights neighborhood. The school's former athletic program's teams were known as the Cowboys.

City Park Collegiate was re-established in 1986 as an alternative education program to meet the needs of students having difficulty in the regular school setting. In 2003–2004, the timetable was expanded to a fully modified program. This program offered modified versions of compulsory high school courses along with many regular-level, hands-on electives.

The facility was renovated in 2015 and is now a multi-use school hosting various division programs including an elementary Montessori program, an online learning center, Ecoquest, Outdoor School and more.

=== Health ===
- Saskatoon City Hospital - originally opened in 1909 as western Canada's first municipal hospital. The original building was on 6th Avenue North; by 1927 a larger facility was built at the present site on Queen Street. It was expanded in 1930 and again in 1950. In the 1990s, part of the hospital was demolished and replaced the current building, completed in 1993. The hospital offers full acute care services, surgical facilities, and other specialized services. Unlike Saskatoon's other two hospitals, Royal University Hospital and St. Paul's Hospital, the emergency department of City Hospital is not open 24 hours a day.

== Parks and recreation ==
- Wilson Park - 6.4 acres (2.6 ha)
- Mendel Site Park - 8.3 acres (3.4 ha)
- Meewasin Park - 9.3 acres (3.8 ha)
- Kinsmen Park - 29.0 acres (11.7 ha)

The Mendel Art Gallery was Saskatoon's major public art gallery, containing works of art from local, national and international artists, until its closure in 2015. Attached to the gallery was Saskatoon's civic conservatory, containing seasonal flower displays as well as tropical and arid plants.

The City Park Community Association organizes social and leisure programs, such as adult fitness, children/youth sports and preschool playgrounds. The association also maintains the outdoor rink at the former First Nations University of Canada campus.

== Public services ==
City Park is a part of the central division of the Saskatoon Police Services patrol system. Saskatoon Fire & Protective Services' central division covers the neighbourhood. Transit services to City Park are provided by Saskatoon Transit on routes 12 (River Heights/City Centre) and 14 (North Industrial/City Centre).

== Commercial ==
City Park contains several business districts. On the west side and south sides of the neighbourhood are commercial zones immediately adjacent to the Central Business District. Several professional businesses line Queen Street, which runs past Saskatoon City Hospital. There is a small collection of businesses near the center of City Park, at 7th Avenue North and Princess Street. Finally, there are businesses along the north edge of the neighbourhood, parallel to the Canadian Pacific Railway tracks. There are 66 home-based businesses in City Park.

== Location ==
City Park is located within the Core Neighbourhoods Suburban Development Area. It is bounded by the South Saskatchewan River to the east, railway tracks to the west, 33rd Street to the north, and 25th Street to the south. Most Streets are laid out in a grid plan, with avenues running north–south and streets running east–west. Some roads in the south and west parts of City Park are angled to align with their continuations in the Central Business District. Spadina Crescent roughly follows the course of the river on the east edge of the neighbourhood.
