= Mayfair, Saskatoon =

Mayfair
- Neighbourhood
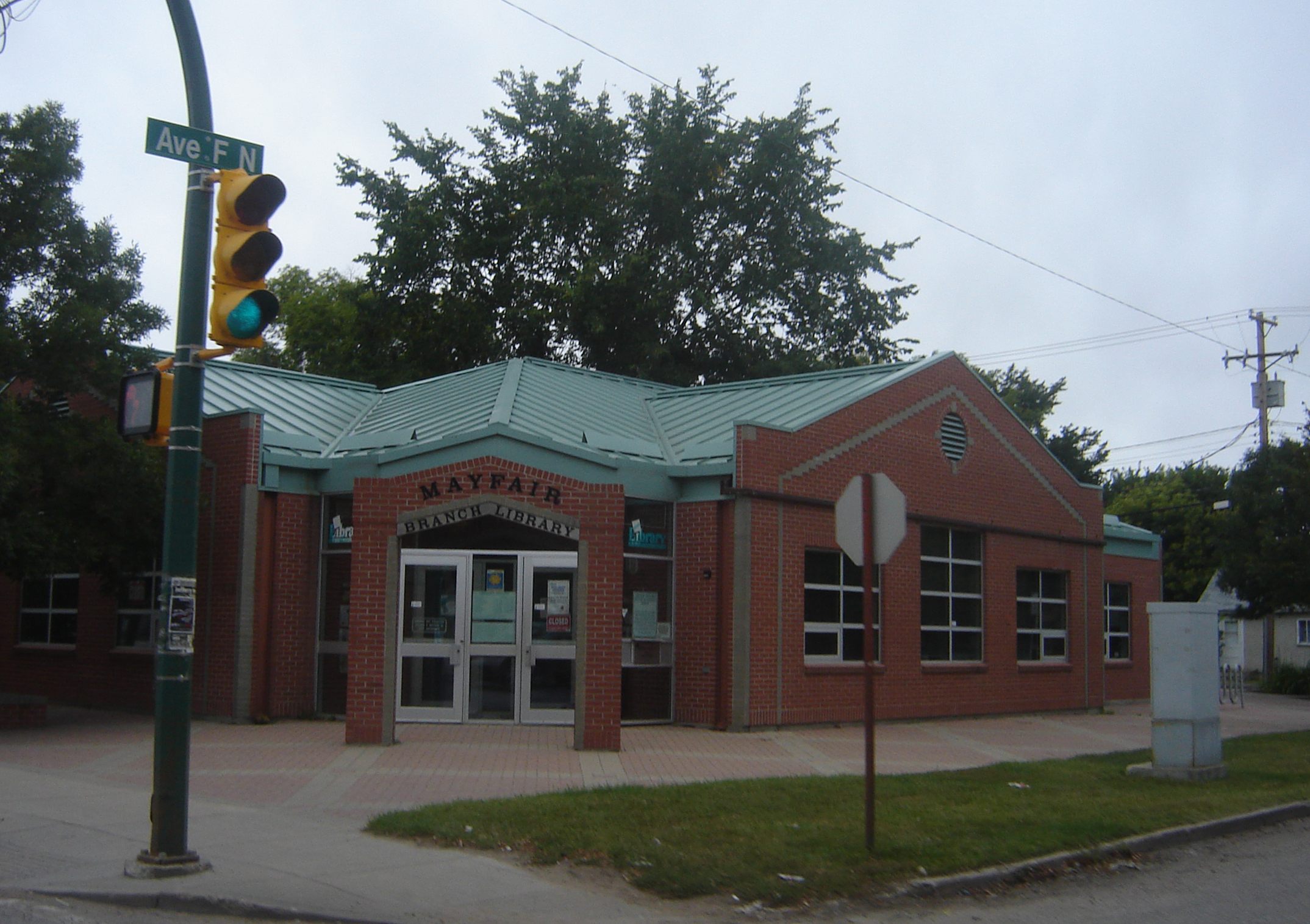
- Mayfair public library
- Interactive map of Mayfair
- Coordinates: 52°8′53.5″N 106°40′31.4″W
- Country: Canada
- Province: Saskatchewan
- City: Saskatoon
- Suburban Development Area: Lawson Suburban Development Area
- Neighbourhood: Lawson Heights

Government
  - Type: Municipal (Ward 1)
  - Administrative body: Saskatoon City Council
  - Councillor: Darren Hill

Area
  - Total: 0.952 km^{2} (0.368 sq mi)

Population (2006)
  - Total: 2,485
  - Density: 2,610/km^{2} (6,760/sq mi)
  - Average Income: $37,500
- Time zone: UTC-6 (CST)

Mayfair is a neighbourhood in the city of Saskatoon, Saskatchewan, Canada. Mayfair started out as a community outside of the villages of Riversdale, Nutana and Saskatoon and appears as its own place name on a map of 1907. In 1909 there were 60 residences built in Mayfair, and in 1911, the City of Saskatoon had grown large enough to encompass Mayfair. Homeownership amongst the residents is at 68.2%.

== Location ==
Within the Lawson Suburban Development Area (West Side), the neighbourhood of Mayfair is bounded to the south by 33rd Street East, the north by Circle Drive. The width is determined by Idylwyld Drive (Avenue A) and Avenue H.

== History ==
Mayfair was originally developed in the late 1800s-early 1900s as a separate community known as Mayfair Addition, with its own street naming. By 1912 the community had been annexed into the city, however its original street names continued to be in use for several years:

- 33rd Street West was previously named "Albert" (although it was also known at the same time as 33rd Street), Albert would go on to be reused as Albert Avenue on the east side as part of the grid system in the Nutana, Haultain, Queen Elizabeth and Avalon neighbourhoods.
- 34th Street West was previously named "James". James would go on to be reused in the Forest Grove neighbourhood.
- 35th Street West was previously named "Charles"
- 36th Street West was previously named "Lily"
- 37th Street West was previously named "Frisco"

- Book about Mayfair: City of Saskatoon Planning Dept. Mayfair: a Plan for Neighbourhood Improvement

== Layout ==
Streets are laid out east and west, avenues are laid out running north and south. Streets increment in number as travel heads northward. Avenues increment alphabetically as travel proceeds west. The whole of the Mayfair community is also laid out in a grid pattern.

== Library ==
- Mayfair Public Library opened September 23, 1952

== Education ==
Mayfair Community School
- 510 34th Street West; Saskatoon, Saskatchewan, S7L 0Y2; Canada

Information
- Type: Elementary
- Opened: 1921
- School board: Saskatoon Public Schools
- Principal: Mr. Pete Chief
- Grades: Pre Kindergarten to Grade 8
- Enrollment: 204 (2018)
- Education system: Public
- Language: English
- Website: Mayfair Community School

- Mayfair School Public Elementary School opened January, 1921.

Prior to the completion of the first stage of Mayfair School, pupils of the district were accommodated in temporary frame structures. The basement for the brick school at Mayfair had been completed in 1914. However, further progress on construction was not resumed until six years later. In January 1919, the Board realized that the use of the framed buildings would no longer meet the accommodation needs of the Mayfair district. Tenders were called for the completion of the permanent structure. A. W. Cassidy and Company was offered the contract, and work commenced in August of that year. The amount of the tender and sub-trades was a total of $212,484.00. This first stage of the building structure provided ten classrooms.

In 1952 an addition of four classrooms and an auditorium, was completed in 1952 at a total cost of $133,393.00.

Building plans for the 1958-59 school year provided for an addition of four classrooms at Mayfair school. Architects, Webster, Forrester and Scott, and contractor W.C. Wells, were involved in the project which was opened in September 1959.

The Mayfair community is located adjacent to the Kelsey campus of Saskatchewan Polytechnic to the southeast.

== Government and politics ==
Mayfair exists within the federal electoral district of Saskatoon West. It is currently represented by Brad Redekopp of the Conservative Party of Canada, first elected in 2019.

Provincially, the area is mostly within the constituency of Saskatoon Westview. It is currently represented by David Buckingham of the Saskatchewan Party, first elected in 2016. A small portion of the neighbourhood north of 38th Street is within the constituency of Saskatoon Northwest.

In Saskatoon's non-partisan municipal politics, Mayfair lies within ward 1. It is currently represented by Darren Hill, first elected in 2006.

== Shopping ==
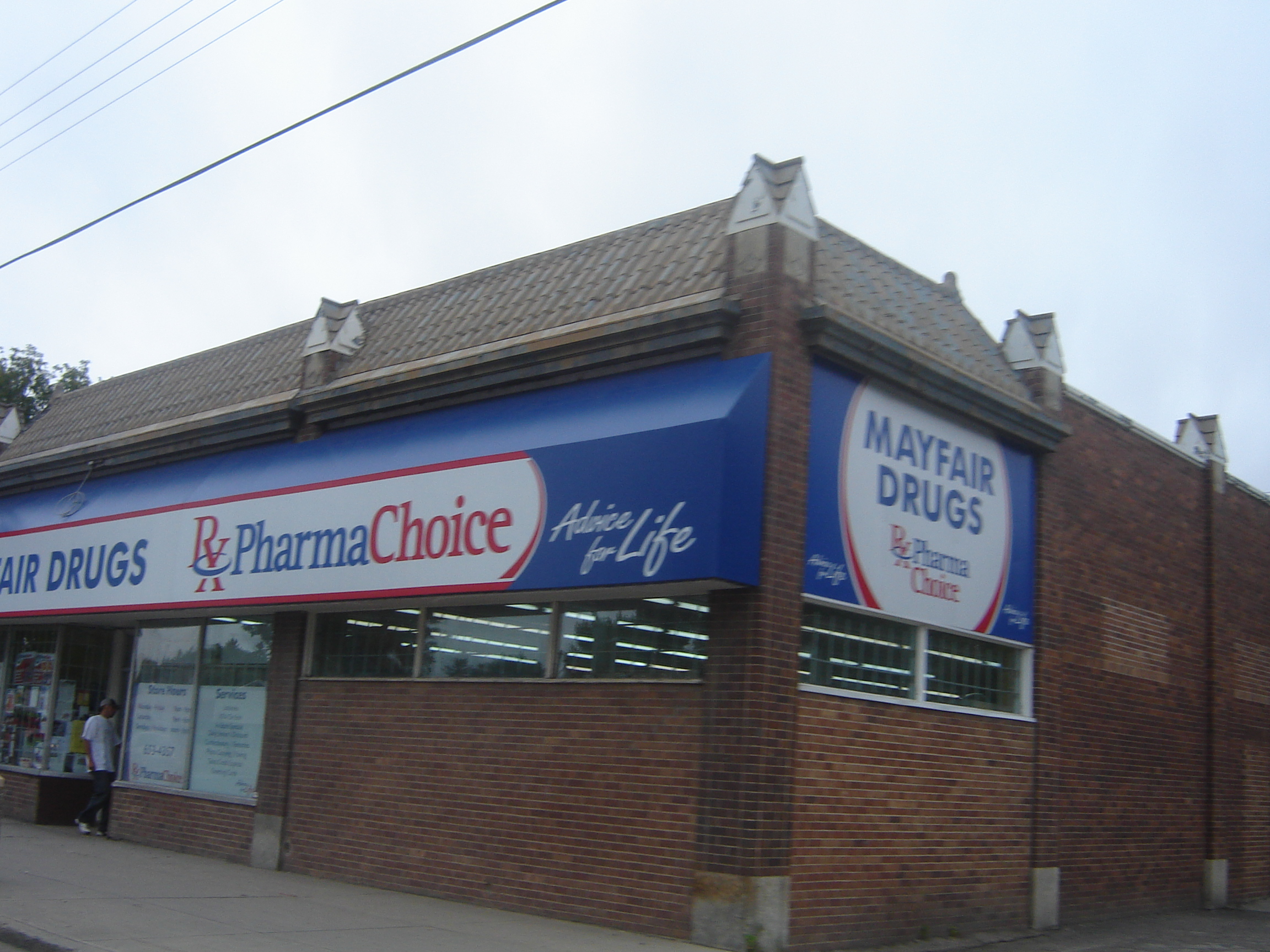
Mayfair Drugs

Shopping lines both sides of 33rd Street East, consisting primarily of small independent businesses; additional shopping can be found on Idylwyld Drive on the east.

- Mayfair Hardware opened June 1949
- Christie's Mayfair Bakery opened 1933
- FreshCo (formerly Safeway Inc.)
- Mayfair Sporting Goods Inc.

== Area Parks ==
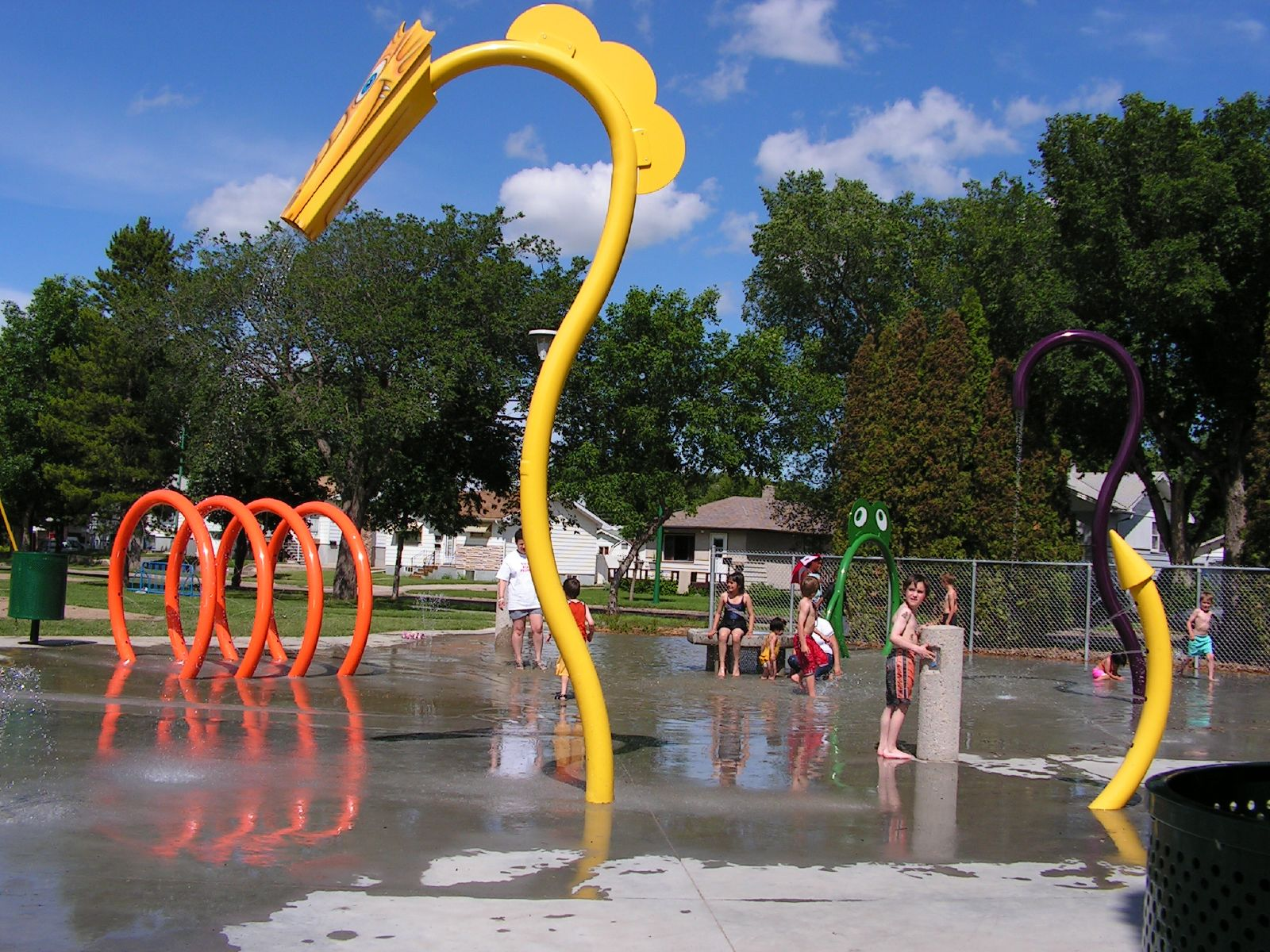
A.H. Browne Park

- A.H. Browne Park 4.83 acres (19,500 m^{2}). The park features a seasonal water park/padding pool, baseball diamond, tobaggon hill, and soccer/football field.

The park was built on land acquired by the City of Saskatoon for non-payment of taxes, It is located on 37th St. between Avenues D and F. It is a legacy of the pre-war boom and bust as land speculators found themselves unable to sell off their properties and in many cases simply allowed ownership to revert to the City.

The east half of the park (including the paddling pool) was built in 1955. In 1957 part of Avenue E was closed north of 37th and the park was extended west to Avenue F. Previously known informally as "Mayfair Park", it was now formally named in honour of long-time Parks Superintendent Alfred H. Browne. In 1980, with funding provided by the Mayfair Neighbourhood Improvement Plan (NIP) it was re-landscaped. A hill was built in the center, the ball diamond was moved and expanded and new playgrounds, a soccer pitch and basketball court were built.

== Transportation ==
Idylwyld Drive was previously known as Avenue A; it was part of Highway 11 until the number was reassigned to Circle Drive. It is a main thoroughfare through the city connecting Regina, Saskatoon and Prince Albert, Saskatchewan. It also connects west Saskatoon with the bedroom communities of Warman and Martensville and directly connects Mayfair to downtown. 33rd Street is the community's other major artery.

=== City transit ===
Mayfair is served by Saskatoon Transit.

== Life ==
The Hudson Bay Park | Mayfair | Kelsey-Woodlawn Community Association provides leisure activities for various age groups and they are made available for area residents at Mayfair community school.
