= Bishop James Mahoney High School =

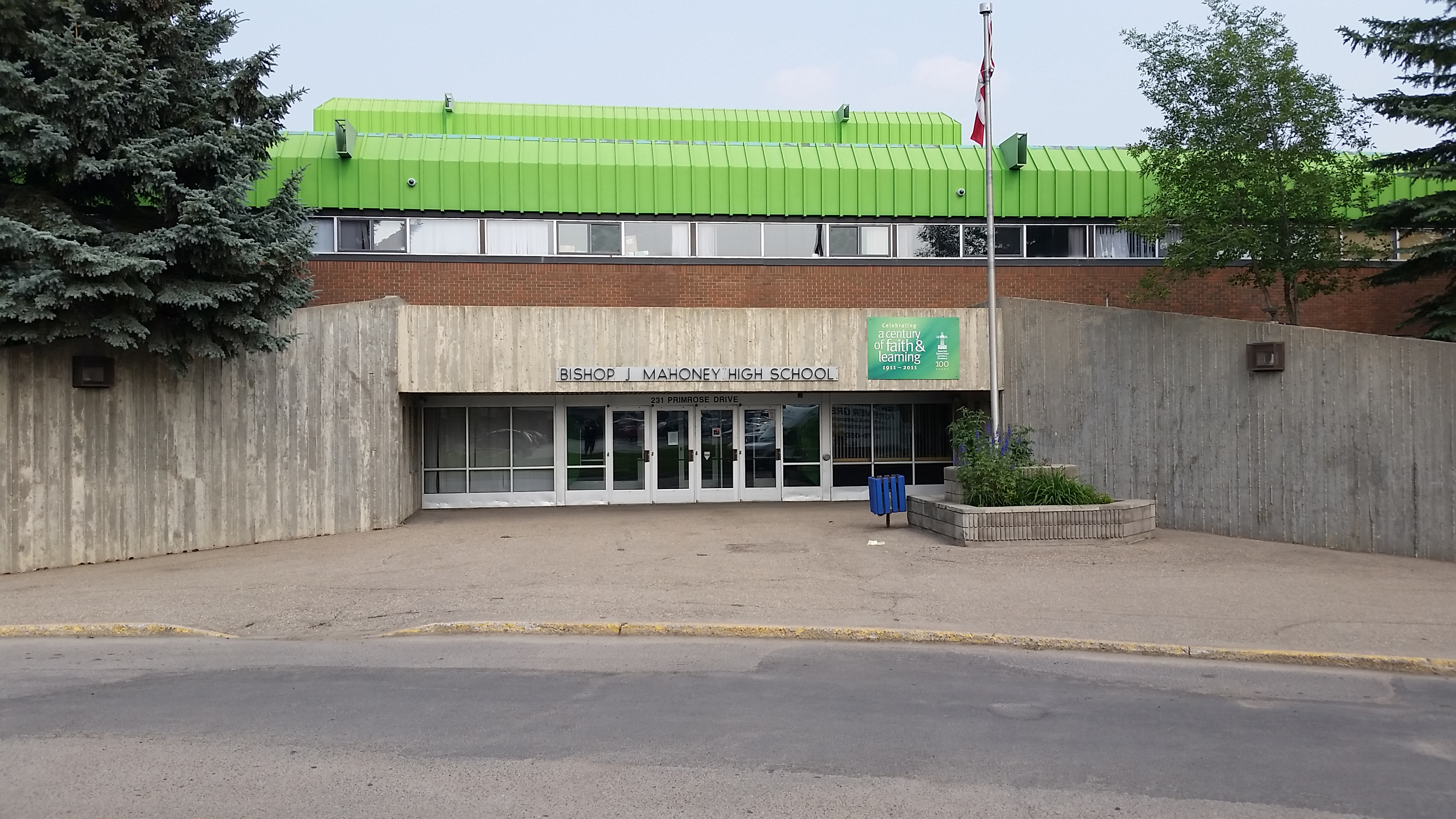

Location
- 231 Primrose Drive; Saskatoon, Saskatchewan, S7K 6Y3; Canada; 52.172260°N 106.632082°W

Information
- Type: Secondary
- Motto: Fidelis Deus (God is faithful)
- Religious affiliation: Catholic
- Opened: September 4, 1984
- School board: Greater Saskatoon Catholic Schools
- Principal: Cheryl Fenrich
- Grades: Grade 9 to Grade 12
- Enrollment: 871 (2025)
- Education system: Separate
- Language: English, French immersion
- Colours: Blue and green
- Team name: Saints
- Website: Bishop James Mahoney High School

Bishop James Mahoney High School (BJM) is a high school serving grades 9 to 12, located in the Lawson Heights neighbourhood in the north end of Saskatoon, Saskatchewan, Canada. It is also known as Bishop Mahoney High School. It is the only Catholic high school in the north end of Saskatoon, serving the Silverwood Heights, Lawson Heights, River Heights, Richmond Heights, and North Park neighbourhoods. It is operated by Greater Saskatoon Catholic Schools.

Currently its feeder schools are École Sister O'Brien School, St. Angela School, St. Anne School, St. George School and École St. Paul School.

== History ==
Bishop James Mahoney High School opened for classes on September 4, 1984. It is named in honour of the Most Reverend James P. Mahoney, former Bishop of Saskatoon, in recognition of his many contributions to Catholic Education in Saskatoon. Prior to his appointment as Bishop, Mahoney was a classroom teacher at the former St. Paul's High School and E. D. Feehan Catholic High School. He also served as the first principal of Holy Cross High School. During his episcopate, Bishop Mahoney remained interested and involved in Catholic education and as a speaker in the field of education.

== Sports ==
Sport	Grade	Season
Junior and senior football	9–12	Aug–Nov
Junior and senior volleyball	9–12	Sept–Nov
Junior and senior basketball	9–12	Nov–March
Junior and senior badminton	9–12	March–May
Boys' soccer	9–12	Apr–May
Girls' soccer	9–12	Sep–Nov
Cross country running	9–12	Aug–Oct
Wrestling	9–12	Dec–March
Track	9–12	April–May
Girls' and boys' curling	9–12	Oct–Mar
Golf	9–12	May

== Notable alumni ==
- Brian Guebert – former CFL player with Winnipeg Blue Bombers
- Melissa Hawach – involved in precedent setting multinational custody dispute
- Kelsie Hendry – Olympic pole vaulter
- Jenni Hucul – Canadian bobsledder
- Kaylyn Kyle – Canadian women's national soccer team player and Olympic bronze medalist
- Cory Mantyka – former NFL player with DET Lions
- Brent Sopel – former NHL player
