= North Park, Saskatoon =

North Park
- Neighbourhood
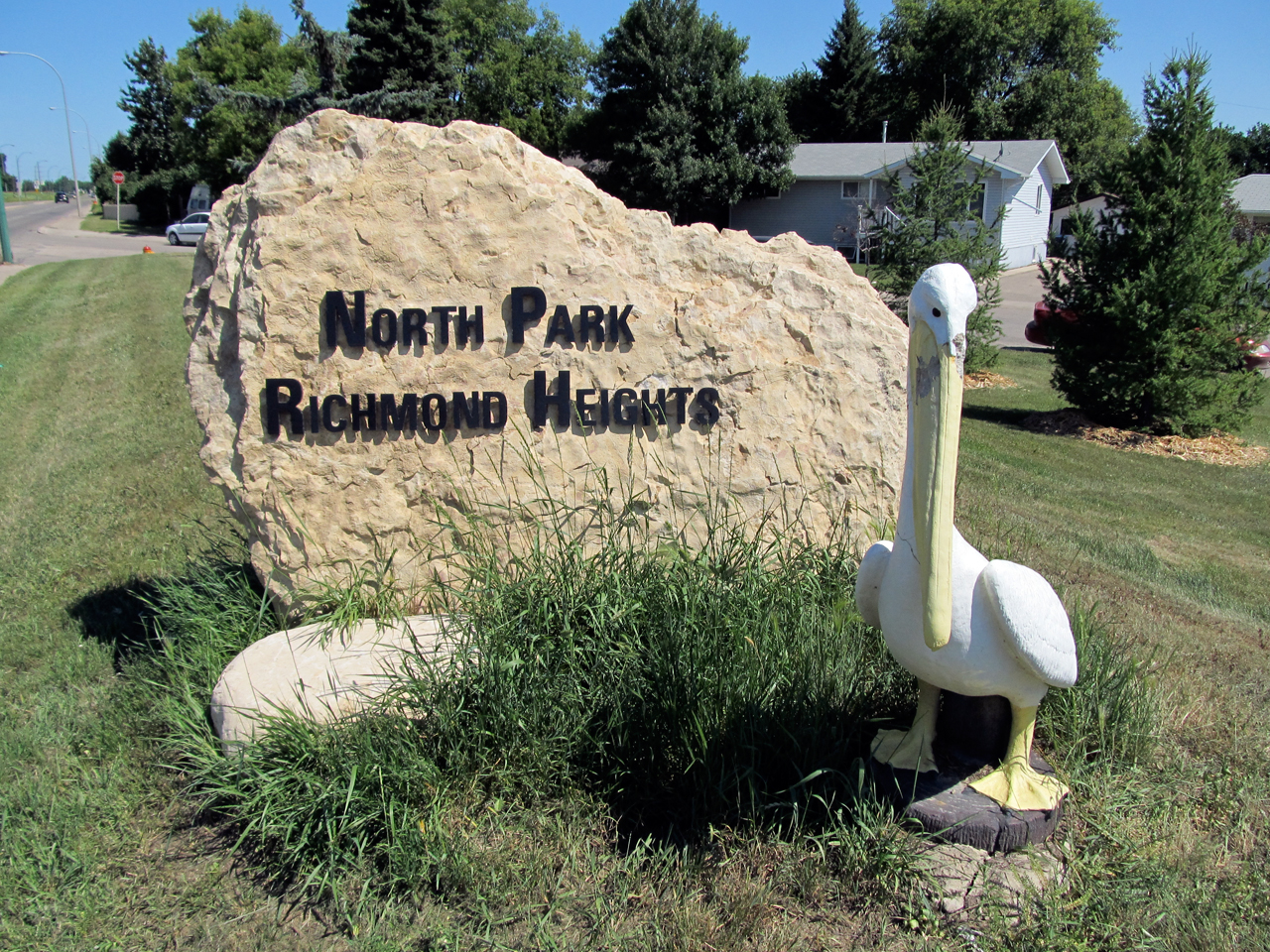
- North Park welcome sign
- Interactive map of North Park
- Coordinates: 52.147778°N 106.650278°W
- Country: Canada
- Province: Saskatchewan
- City: Saskatoon
- Suburban Development Area: Lawson Suburban Development Area
- Neighbourhood: North Park

Government
  - Type: Municipal (Ward 1)
  - Administrative body: Saskatoon City Council
  - Councillor: Darren Hill

Population (2006)
  - Total: 1,910
  - Average Income: $54,284
- Time zone: UTC-6 (CST)

North Park is a community which is just to the north of the Meewasin Riverworks observation area and the CPR Bridge. It has access along its eastern perimeter to the scenic walking trails along the South Saskatchewan River developed by the Meewasin Valley Authority. The average home selling price in 2006 was $101,176- $139,704. Each family was approximately 2.1 residents, and 63.9% of the residents owned their own home.

== Location ==
Within the Lawson Suburban Development Area (West Side), the neighbourhood of North Park is bordered by the south Saskatchewan River on the east and Warman Road which lay parallel to each other. 33rd Street East to the south and Windsor Street demarks the northernmost limit.

== History ==
There are some historic dwellings in North Park, as there was some development before World War II. Most of the construction of this area, however came to be in the decade after.

The Municipal Railway opened January 1, 1913 and contributed considerably to the growth of North Park and other outlying districts. The South Saskatchewan River provided prime real estate with a view of the scenic Meewasin Valley.

North Park's lifestyle and history are documented in the book The History of North Park by E.T. Pete Russell.

== Layout ==
Streets are laid out bordering the west bank of the South Saskatchewan River and are mainly a grid fashion. The north and south avenues which are central to the community, and corrections have been made to adapt and Empress Avenue and Spadina Crescent which run along the South Saskatchewan River.

North Park also has close access to a small light industrial area of City Park to the south of 33rd Street East.

== Education ==
- North Park Wilson School - public elementary, part of the Saskatoon Public School Division. North Park operated as a classroom of Wilson School between 1939 and 1954 before opening in its own 8 room school. The school was previously known as North Park School prior to the 1993 amalgamation with Wilson School.
- École St. Paul School - separate (Catholic) elementary, part of Greater Saskatoon Catholic Schools

== Government and politics ==
North Park exists within the federal electoral district of Saskatoon—University. It is currently represented by Corey Tochor of the Conservative Party of Canada, first elected in 2019.

Provincially, the area is within the constituency of Saskatoon Meewasin. It is currently represented by Nathaniel Teed of the Saskatchewan New Democratic Party, first elected in a 2022 by-election.

In Saskatoon's non-partisan municipal politics, North Park lies within ward 1. It is currently represented by Darren Hill, first elected in 2006.

== Area parks ==
- Marriott Park - 0.77 acres (3,100 m^{2})
- Horn Park - 0.44 acres (1,800 m^{2})
- North Park Rec. Unit - 0.92 acres (3,700 m^{2})

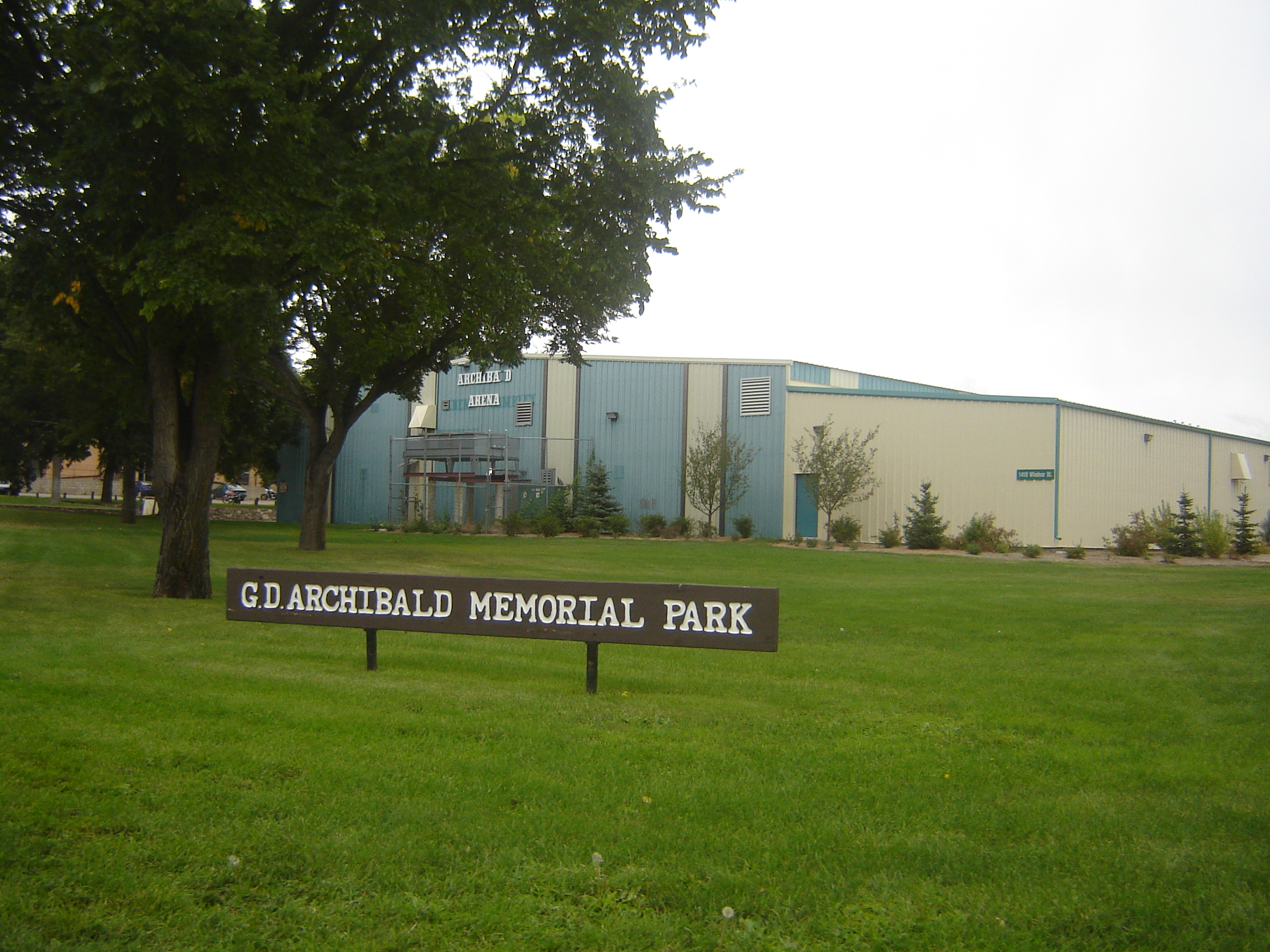
Archibald arena

== Transportation ==
=== City Transit ===
North Park is serviced by City Transit Bus Routes Saskatoon Transit.

33rd Street is a major roadway accessing western Saskatoon. Spadina Crescent provides scenic transportation between the Central Business District and communities to the north which are part of the Lawson SDA. Warman Road is a main access road between Central Business District and the North West Industrial SDA which bypasses North Park with limited arterial access into the neighbourhood.

== Life ==
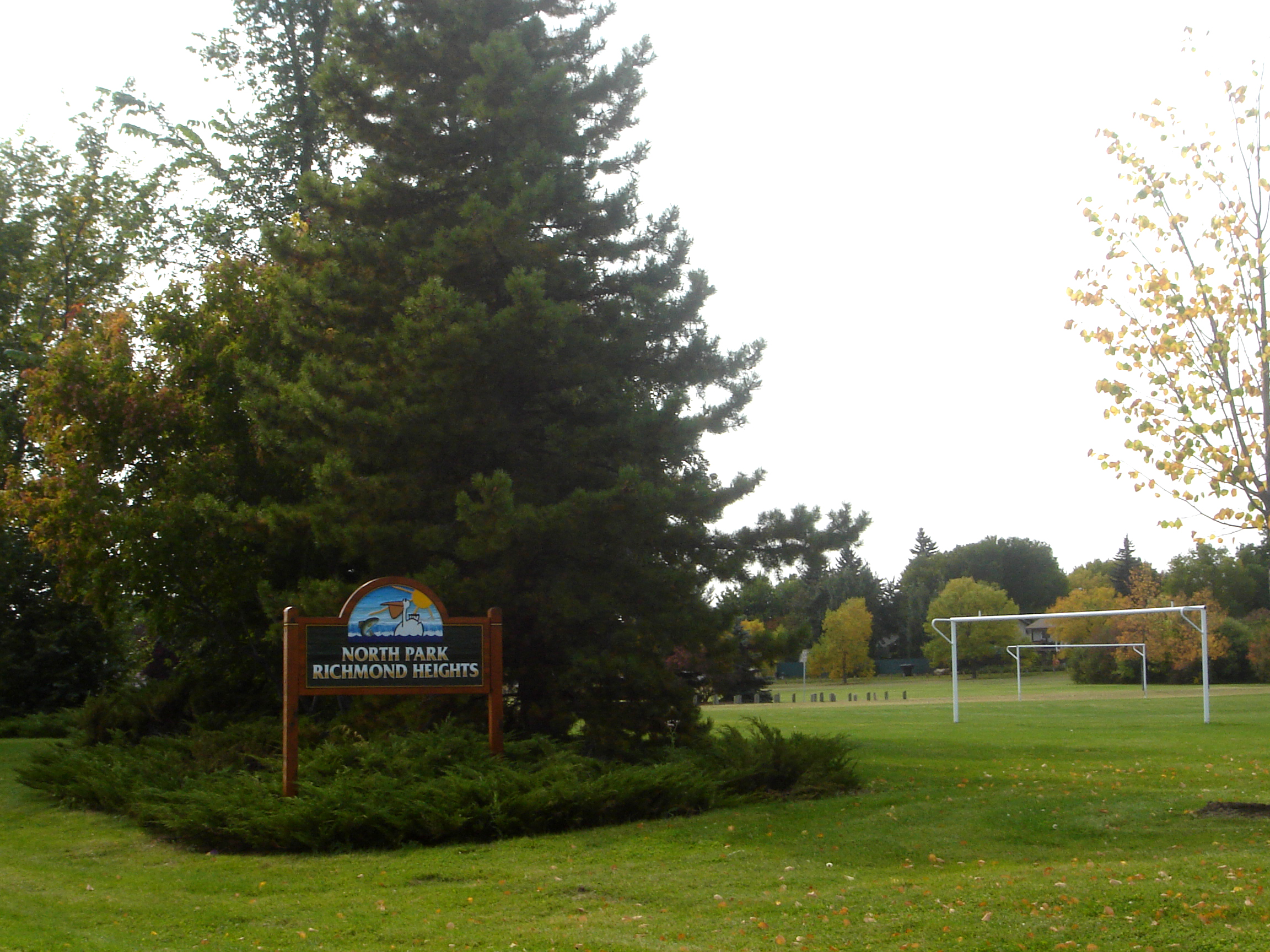
North Park Richmond Heights sign

The North Park / Richmond Heights Community Association has amalgamated to provide community services for the Saskatoon area between 33rd Street East and Circle Drive utilizing facilities available at North Park-Wilson, River Heights, and St. Paul Schools.
