= Silverwood Heights, Saskatoon =

Silverwood Heights
- Neighbourhood
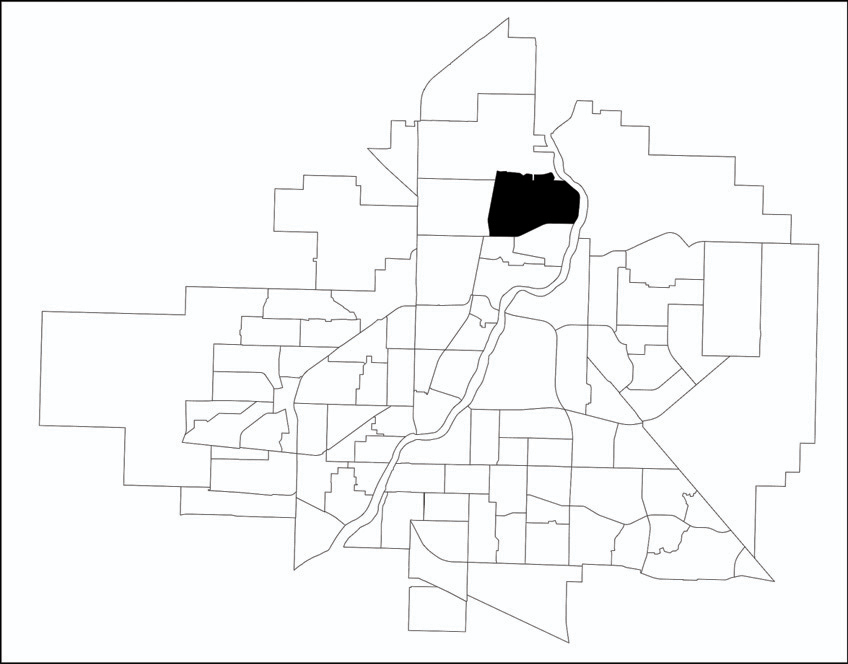
- Silverwood Heights location map
- Coordinates: 52°10′48″N 106°37′22″W
- Country: Canada
- Province: Saskatchewan
- City: Saskatoon
- Suburban Development Area: Lawson
- Neighbourhood: Silverwood Heights
- Settled: 1907
- Annexed: 1975-1979
- Construction: 1971-1990

Government
  - Type: Municipal (Ward 5)
  - Administrative body: Saskatoon City Council
  - Councillor: Randy Donauer

Area
  - Total: 3.71 km^{2} (1.43 sq mi)

Population (2024)
  - Total: 10,444
  - Density: 2,820/km^{2} (7,290/sq mi)
  - Median personal income: $49,600
- Time zone: UTC-6 (CST)
- Website: Silverwood Heights Community Association

Silverwood Heights is a mostly residential neighbourhood located in north-central Saskatoon, Saskatchewan, Canada. It is a suburban subdivision, composed mostly of single detached dwellings and some multiple-unit apartment and semi-detached dwellings. As of 2024, the area is home to 10,444 residents. The neighbourhood is considered a middle to high-income area, with a median personal income of $49,600, an average sale price of $302,232 and a home ownership rate of 76%.

== History ==
=== Beginnings ===
The land that is now occupied by Silverwood Heights was originally owned by a number of parties. They included an 1891 grant to the Temperance Colonization Society, who established the first permanent settlement in the Saskatoon area (Nutana); a farmer from Great Britain, John Malcolm Mark, who obtained land for a homestead in 1900; and Cleeve W. Taylor, another homesteader.

William Alexander "Billy" Silverwood arrived in Saskatoon from Ontario in about 1907 and bought land two miles (3 km) north of the city limits. A livestock dealer by occupation, he built a large barn on his land (known as the Silver Springs Farm) to house his horses and cattle. By 1911, he opened the Silverwood Springs bottling plant, using spring water found on his farm. Saskatoon did not yet have a safe drinking water supply, and deaths caused by typhoid fever from contaminated well water were common. Until the city completed its own filtration system, Silverwood's bottled water was a popular commodity.

=== Factoria ===
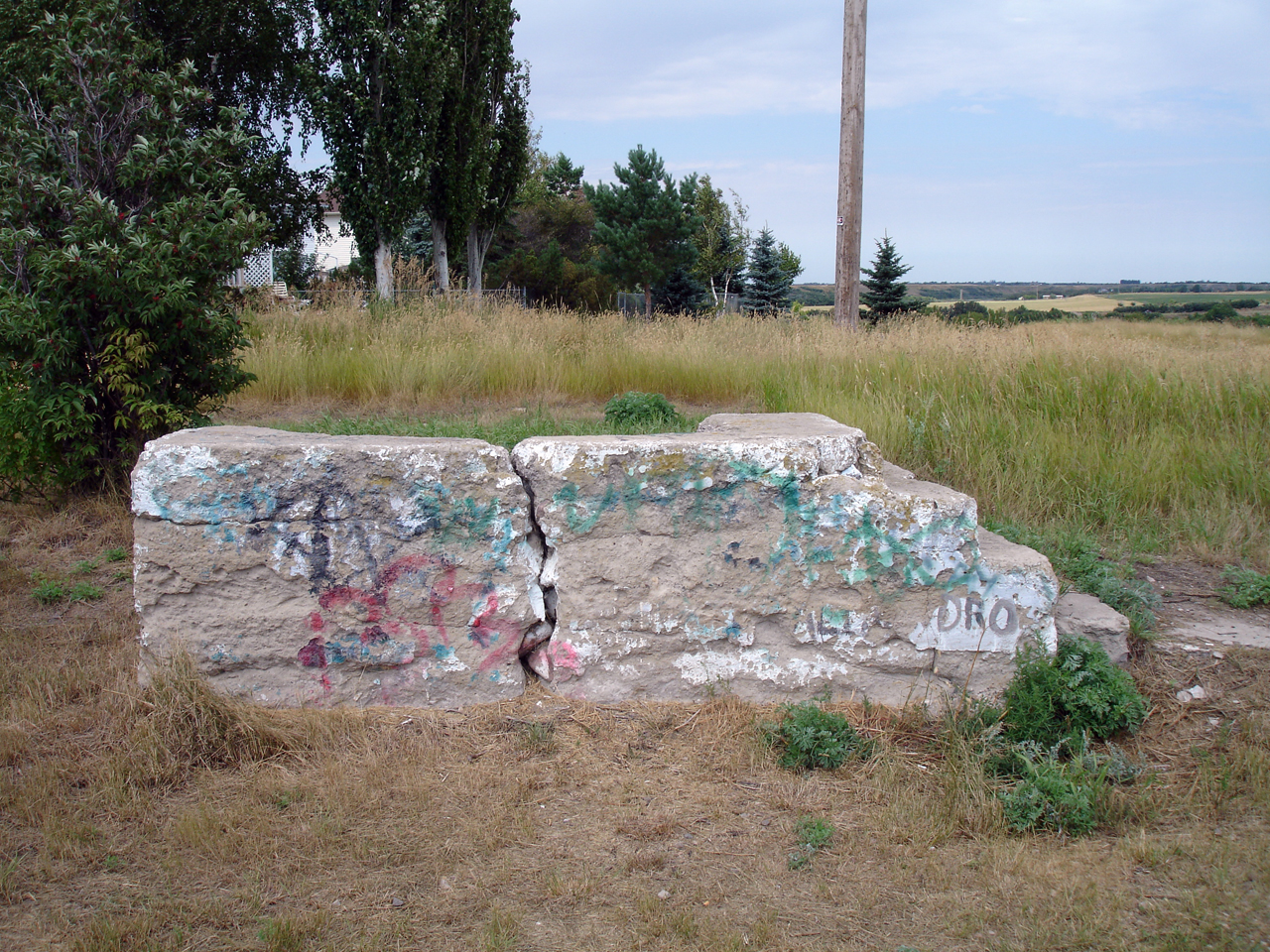
Remains of the Silverwood Barn, located at the end of present-day Adilman Drive

The natural spring water of the Silverwood farm attracted the attention of Robert E. Glass, a businessman from Chicago. He bought 470 acres (1.9 km^{2}) of land from Billy Silverwood, took over his bottling plant and intended to establish a brewery. While the brewery was never built, Glass had even bigger plans. An article in the November 9, 1912 Daily Phoenix newspaper not only announced his purchase of the Silver Springs Farm, but also his intentions to establish an industrial city called "Factoria" on the site. It was promoted as having abundant natural resources - water, limestone, sand and clay - to support a variety of manufacturing ventures.

By 1913, several businesses had set up shop in Factoria. They included a flour mill, a farm implement dealer, two brick factories, a hotel and restaurant. A CN Railway spur line had been extended to the site, and there were plans to incorporate as a village and to build a school and post office. However, the business owners were unable to pay for electricity to be supplied to the site, and by 1914 the economic picture turned sour. Outside capital (mainly from Britain) that fueled the prewar boom had evaporated in the lead-up to World War I. Banks responded by putting a freeze on credit, which severely curtailed investment.

Glass's grandiose dream of an industrial city had failed, and most of Factoria's businesses closed within a few years. The once-lucrative bottling plant had closed by 1914; by then, the city had constructed its own filtration system, and runoff from Silverwood's livestock operation had contaminated the spring water. Both the Factoria Hotel and Factoria Restaurant were gone by 1915. The Northern Brick, Tile & Supply Company was struck from the province's register of companies in early 1916.

By April 1918, the sought-after power line was finally completed. The new owners of the Northland Milling Company flour mill, Interprovincial Flour Mills Ltd., paid the $4500 cost to secure the line. Saska Manufacturing Company (later Jackson Machines Ltd.) continued to operate until 1923. The flour mill outlasted all its neighbours; it was purchased by the Robin Hood Milling Company in 1927 and reportedly operated until the World War II years.

=== Later years ===
As the businesses of Factoria failed, the land around them reverted to farmland. The structures were abandoned and either gradually fell into ruins or were demolished. In August 1951, the Silverwood barn was struck by lightning and destroyed in the resulting fire. Remains of its stone foundation are still visible, located at the end of present-day Adilman Drive. The City of Saskatoon gained title to much of the land by 1968, and formally annexed the land for Silverwood Heights between 1975 and 1979. The H. McIvor Weir Wastewater Treatment Plant was constructed in the neighbourhood in 1971. The majority of homes were constructed between 1981 and 1985, with a few hundred more being built in the decade before and after that period. All that remains of the former Factoria structures are a few scattered and eroded foundations.

== Street naming ==
Street names chosen for Silverwood Heights for the most part honor Saskatoon business pioneers and notable educators. In 1996, the stretch of Warman Road on the western edge of the neighbourhood was renamed Wanuskewin Road.

== Government and politics ==
Silverwood Heights exists within the federal electoral district of Saskatoon—University. It is currently represented by Corey Tochor of the Conservative Party of Canada, first elected in 2019.

Provincially, the area is within the constituency of Saskatoon Chief Mistawasis It is currently represented by Don McBean of the New Democratic Party, first elected in the 2024 General Election.

In Saskatoon's non-partisan municipal politics, Silverwood Heights lies within ward 5. It is currently represented by Randy Donauer, first elected in a 2010 by-election.

== Institutions ==
=== Education ===
Brownell School

Location
- 274 Russell Road; Saskatoon, Saskatchewan, S7K 7E1; Canada

Information
- Type: Elementary
- Opened: 1985
- School board: Saskatoon Public School Division
- Principal: Candace Wilson
- Grades: Kindergarten to Grade 8
- Enrollment: 247 (2025)
- Education system: Public
- Language: English
- Colour: Navy Blue
- Sports: Volleyball, Basketball
- Mascot: Brownell Bear
- Feeder to: Marion M. Graham Collegiate
- Website: Brownell School

Silverwood Heights School
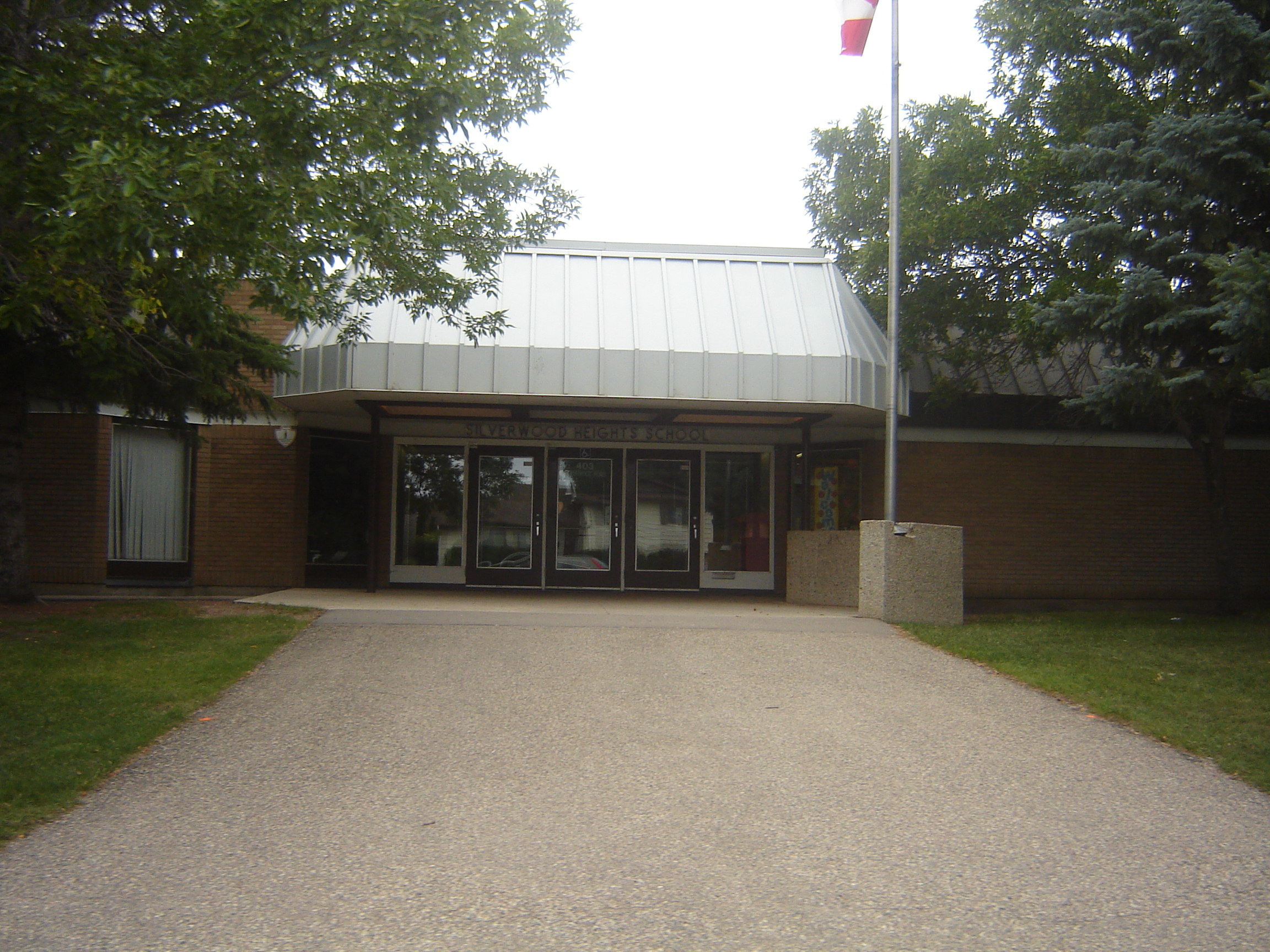

Location
- 403 Silverwood Road; Saskatoon, Saskatchewan, S7K 6G1; Canada

Information
- Type: Elementary
- Opened: 1979
- School board: Saskatoon Public School Division
- Principal: Danielle Tooley
- Grades: Kindergarten to Grade 8
- Enrollment: 231 (2025)
- Education system: Public
- Language: English
- Colours: Blue, white and yellow
- Team name: Silverwood Lightning
- Feeder to: Marion M. Graham Collegiate
- Website: Silverwood Heights School

École Sister O'Brien School
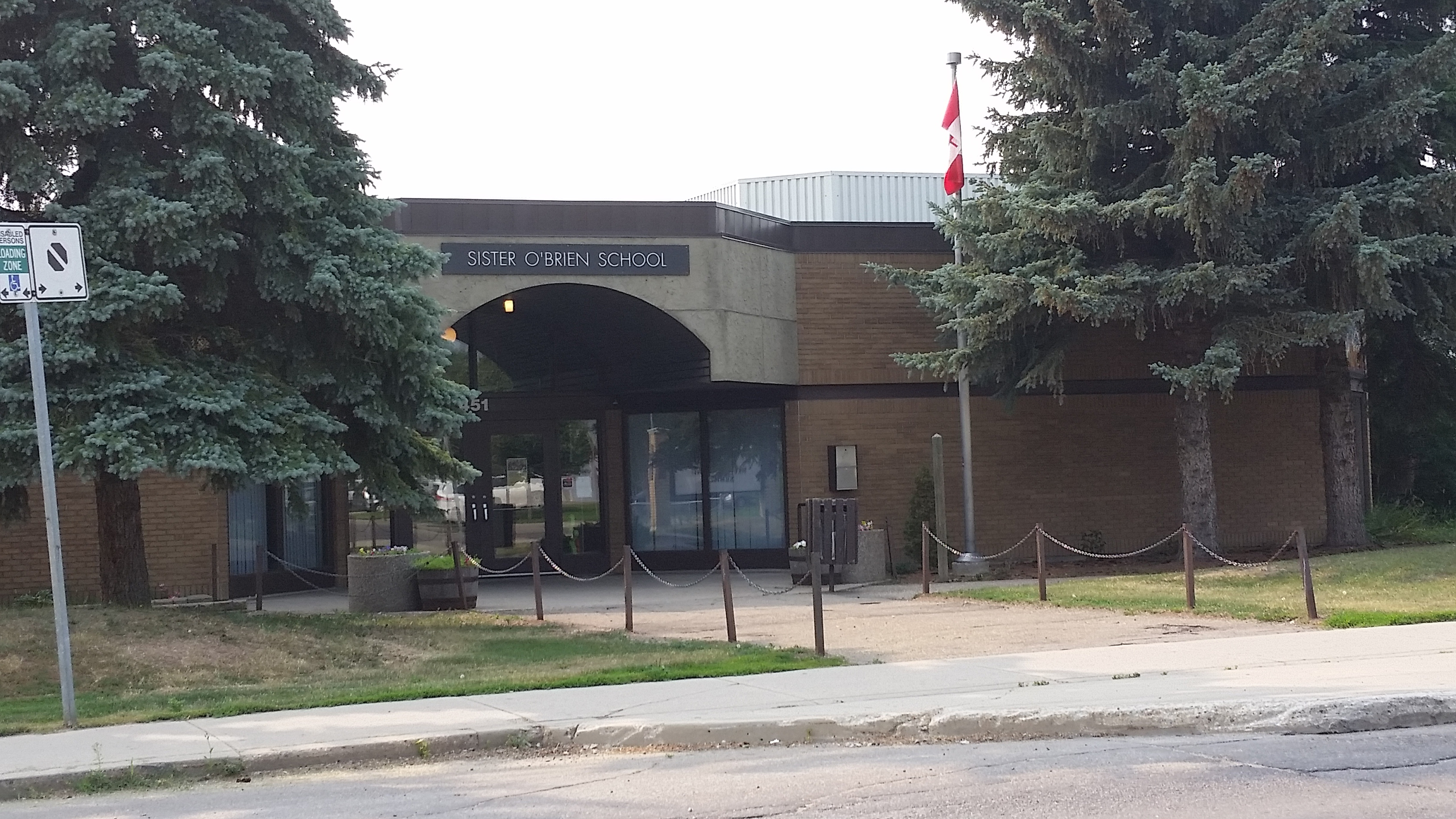

Location
- 451 Silverwood Road; Saskatoon, Saskatchewan, S7M 1L3; Canada

Information
- Type: Elementary
- Religious affiliation: Catholic
- Opened: 1981
- School board: Greater Saskatoon Catholic Schools
- Principal: Jessica Grikis
- Grades: Kindergarten to Grade 8
- Enrollment: 208 (2025)
- Education system: Separate
- Language: English, French
- Feeder to: Bishop James Mahoney High School
- Website: École Sister O'Brien School

St. Angela School
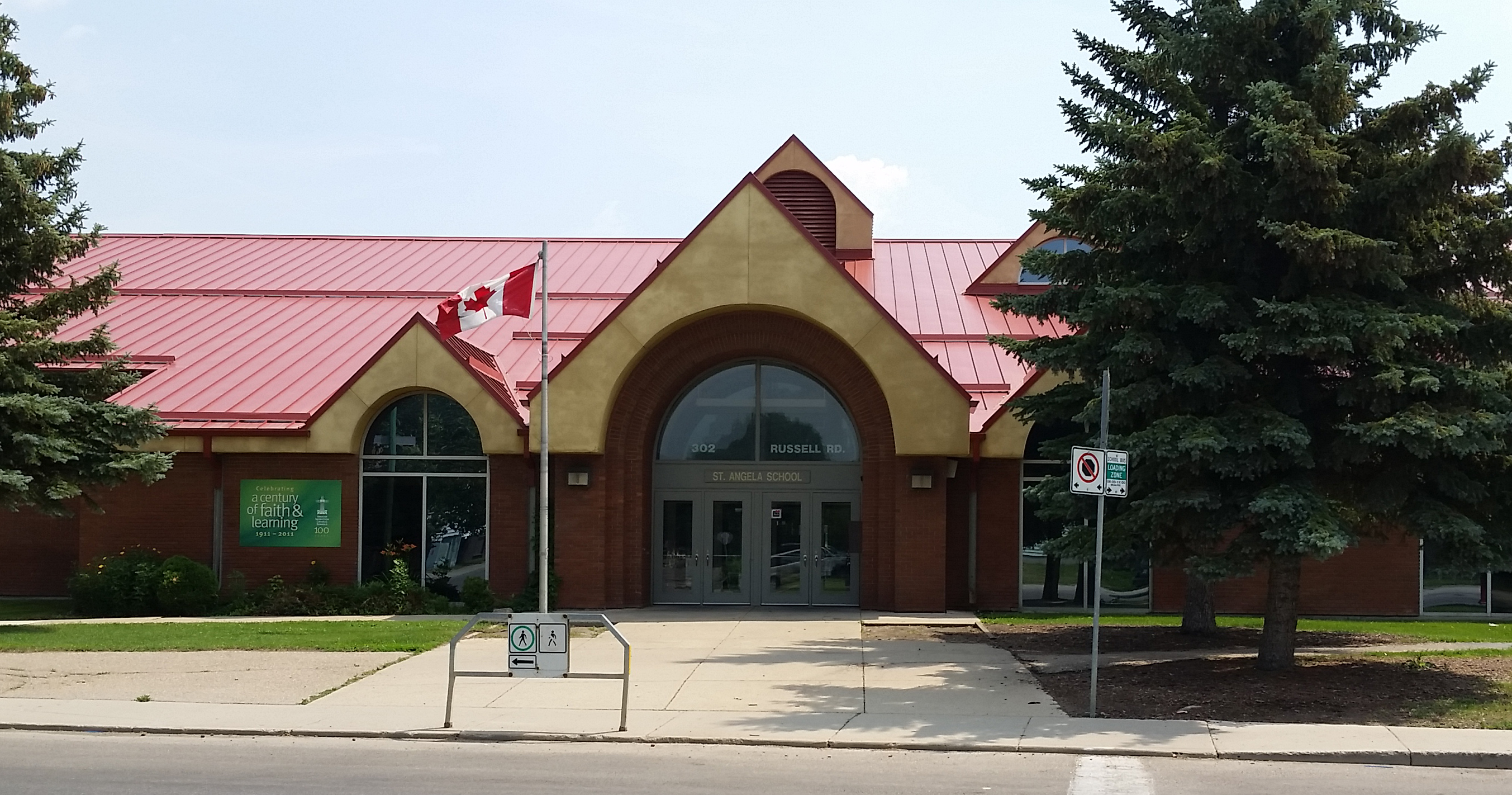

Location
- 302 Russell Road; Saskatoon, Saskatchewan, S7K 6P2; Canada

Information
- Type: Elementary
- Religious affiliation: Catholic
- Opened: 1987
- School board: Greater Saskatoon Catholic Schools
- Principal: Joshua Klein
- Grades: Kindergarten to Grade 8
- Enrollment: 295 (2025)
- Education system: Separate
- Language: English
- Feeder to: Bishop James Mahoney High School
- Website: St. Angela School

- Brownell School - public elementary, part of the Saskatoon Public School Division
- Marion M. Graham Collegiate - public secondary, part of the Saskatoon Public School Division
- Silverwood Heights School - public elementary, part of the Saskatoon Public School Division
- École Sister O'Brien School - separate (Catholic) elementary, part of Greater Saskatoon Catholic Schools. Named in honour of Sister Anne O'Brien, a distinguished member of the Sisters of Service and attendance officer for the school division for 15 years.
- St. Angela School - separate (Catholic) elementary, part of Greater Saskatoon Catholic Schools

=== Public Services ===
Fire Station #7 provides service to the north end of Saskatoon including Silverwood Heights and Lawson Heights.

Silverwood Heights is a part of the Northwest division of the Saskatoon Police Services patrol system.

== Parks and recreation ==
- Silverwood-Adilman Linkage - 1.9 acres (0.77 ha)
- W.J.L. Harvey Park South - 14.9 acres (6.0 ha)
- Meewasin Park - 20.5 acres (8.3 ha)
- W.J.L. Harvey Park North - 41.5 acres (16.8 ha)

The Silverwood Heights Community Association organizes a variety of recreational, social, and educational programs for adults, children/youth, and preschoolers. It is also responsible for looking after area rinks and playgrounds, and is active in helping fund park development.

The Silverwood Golf Course is located adjacent to the community's northern boundaries but is not directly accessible from Silverwood Heights proper.

== Commercial ==
The only commercial development in Silverwood Heights are a couple of neighbourhood convenience stores, plus a grocery store at the corner of Wanuskewin Road and 51st Street. The rest of the land is zoned for residential use. The community is adjacent to the Lawson Heights Suburban Centre, which includes a regional shopping mall and other commercial development, and also the commercial strip along 51st Street extends west from the community. To the north is industrial development.

== Industrial ==
All of Silverwood's former industrial lands from the Factoria period have been converted to residential use. The only modern industrial facility is the City of Saskatoon's wastewater treatment plant on Whiteswan Drive.

== Transportation ==
=== Proposed new bridge ===
In February 2019, the City of Saskatoon called for design ideas for a potential river crossing that would primarily carry a sewer line but also be available for non-motorized users (pedestrians and cyclists). The study area for the bridge encompassed from just north of Pinehouse Drive in Lawson Heights to the southern boundary of the wastewater treatment plant in Silverwood Heights, and the proposed bridge linking Whiteswan Drive to the eastern shore of the South Saskatchewan River near the original alignment of Central Avenue north of Fedoruk Drive. Although originally proposed for completion by 2021, as of 2026 no construction has occurred.

== Location ==
Silverwood Heights is located within the Lawson Suburban Development Area. It is bounded by the Silverwood Golf Course to the north, Lenore Drive to the south, the South Saskatchewan River to the east, and Wanuskewin Road to the west. Roadways are laid out in a modern system of curving collector roads and local roads.
