= Central Industrial, Saskatoon =

Central Industrial
- Neighbourhood
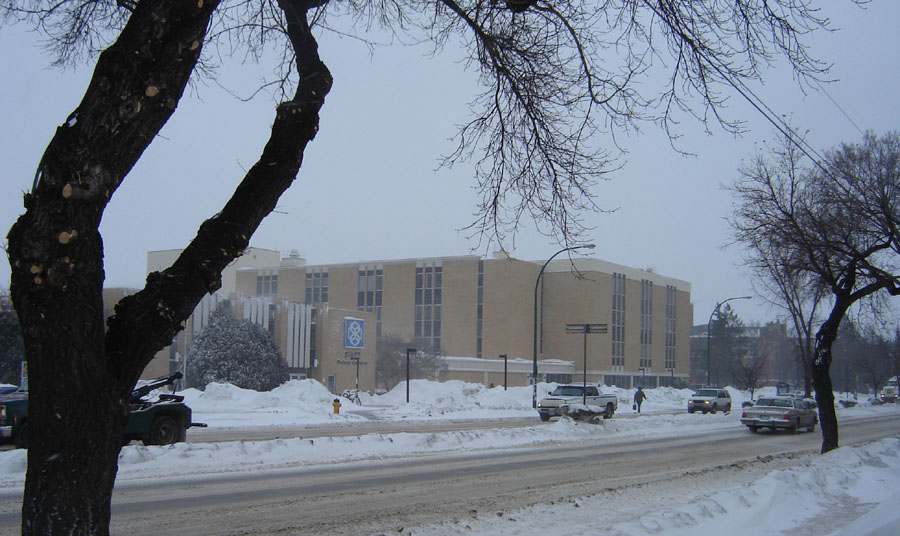
- Kelsey campus of SIAST. Central Industrial, Lawson SDA, Saskatoon
- Interactive map of Central Industrial
- Coordinates: 52°8′20″N 106°39′54″W
- Country: Canada
- Province: Saskatchewan
- City: Saskatoon
- Suburban Development Area: Lawson Suburban Development Area

Government
  - Type: Municipal (Ward 1)
  - Administrative body: Saskatoon City Council
  - Councillor: Darren Hill

Population (2005)
  - Total: 75
- Time zone: UTC-6 (CST)

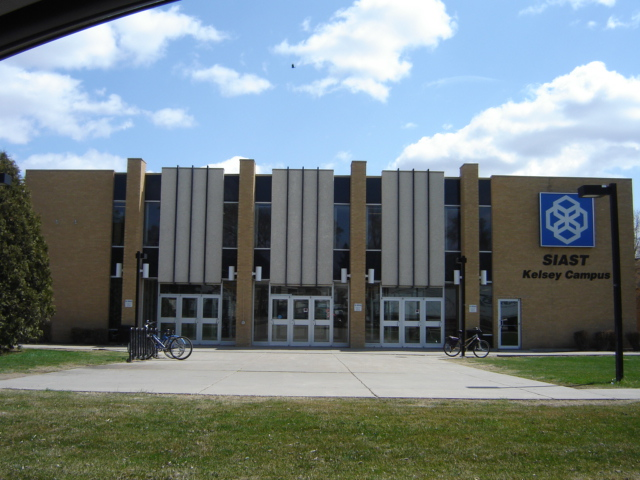
SIAST

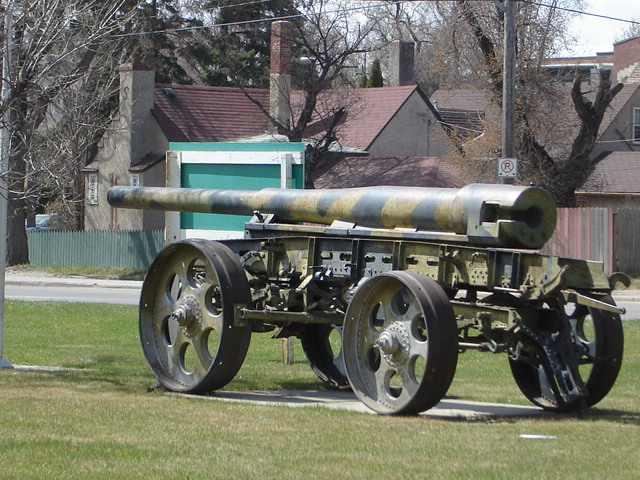
Hugh Cairns V.C. armoury

Central Industrial is a light industrial area in Saskatoon, Saskatchewan, Canada, that comprises educational, recreational facilities, hotels and businesses along Idylwyld Drive. The community meets up with the Central Business District CBD to the west and south, and residential areas east and north.

== Location ==
Within the Lawson Suburban Development Area (West Side), the subdivision of the Central Industrial area reaches as far north as 33rd Street East, and is bordered to the west by Idylwyld Drive. The western boundary is just west of the buildings along First Avenue but not inclusive of them, and to the south, just north of the buildings along 24th Street but not inclusive of them. Due to its size the Robin Hood Flour Mill dominates the area.

== History ==
The industrial area comprising the remnants of the Canadian National Railway train yards and business sector or warehouse district of historical Saskatoon. The Qu'Appelle, Long Lake and Saskatchewan Railway reached Saskatoon in 1890 and crossed the South Saskatchewan River, causing a boom in development on the west side of the river. The CNR Bridge (present day site of the Senator Sid Buckwold Bridge or Freeway/Idywyld Bridge) crosses the South Saskatchewan River through the city connecting Regina, Saskatoon and Prince Albert.

The CNR train yards were moved away from the Central Business District. In 1890 the Qu'Appelle, Long Lake and Saskatchewan Railway Line (QLLR) or The Qu'Appelle, Long Lake and Saskatchewan Steamboat and Railway Line (QLLSR) extended from Regina through to Prince Albert, crossing the South Saskatchewan River where the Senator Sid Buckwold Bridge crosses the river presently. Steam engines could be refilled easier on the west banks of the river which were not so steep. Businesses sprang up around the pumping station forming the beginnings of the Central Business District. The Saskatoon downtown revitalization project began in the 1950s and 1960s when the Canadian National Railway yards were removed and replaced with a shopping mall (which would be renovated several decades later to resemble the original station) called the Midtown Plaza, and its neighbor the TCU Place.

=== CPR switching yards ===
The Canadian Pacific Railway (CPR) downtown switching yards are connected to Saskatoon's east side Sutherland Industrial CPR switching yards via the CPR Bridge across the South Saskatchewan River.

The City of Saskatoon, Canadian Pacific Railway and the CNR are under negotiations currently to remove these switching yards. This would mean the CPR could use CNR rail lines through the city and be able to use the CN Chappell Yards for switching. Likewise the CNR could run trains along the CPR track through the city and use the Sutherland CPR switching yards. This would involve construction of a connecting switching yard between CP and CN rail lines near 11th Street and Dundonald which could be done as part of the new Circle Drive South Bridge extension project.

In the largest area vacated by the CPR yards would be installed a new larger City Police Station. 25th Street would not be truncated, but rather continue in length connecting Idylwyld Drive and the University Bridge or 25th Street Bridge. There would be provision to make a safe intersection of the main CPR railway track and 25th Street crossing.

== Layout ==
A triangular subdivision without residential homes, and without many inner streets and avenues.

== Education ==
- E.A. Davies Building was previously named the Saskatoon Normal School where students came to train as teachers from 1922 to 1964 thus giving rise to its later naming the Saskatoon Teacher's College .
- SIAST Kelsey Institute provides post secondary technical vocational training. The Canadian Vocational Training School opened in 1941 in response to re-training to World War II veterans. Central Saskatchewan Technical Institute erected a building in 1963. 1967 saw another renaming: Saskatchewan Technical Institute of Saskatoon which only lasted until the name: Saskatchewan Institute of Applied Arts and Sciences, was applied in 1968. In 1974, it was renamed Kelsey Institute of Applied Arts and Sciences (KIAAS) in honour of explorer Henry Kelsey.

== Recreation ==
- Harry Bailey Aquatic Centre had its grand opening in 1975 with a 50-metre pool, platform diving tower, and diving springboards and hosted the 1989 Jeux Canada Games.

Due to the opening of the Blairmore Recreational Civic Centre or Shaw Centre in the fall of 2008, changes are being planned for Harry Bailey Aquatic Centre.

- Sands Golf Dome

== Transportation ==
Idylwyld Drive has had many titles: Avenue A, (concurrency with Highway 11 and most currently Louis Riel Trail). It is a main thoroughfare through the city connecting Regina, Saskatoon and Prince Albert, Saskatchewan. It also connects west Saskatoon with the bedroom communities of Warman and Martensville

=== City transit ===
The Central Industrial is serviced by City Transit Bus Routes Saskatoon Transit.
