= Marion M. Graham Collegiate =

Location
- 602 Lenore Drive; Saskatoon, S7K 6A6; Canada; 52.176994°N 106.619305°W

Information
- Type: Secondary
- Motto: Ne Oublie (Do Not Forget)
- Opened: 1984
- School board: Saskatoon Public Schools
- Principal: Jay Harvey
- Grades: Grade 9 to Grade 12
- Enrollment: 639 (2022)
- Education system: Public
- Language: English, French Immersion
- Colours: Maroon and black
- Team name: Falcons
- Website: www.saskatoonpublicschools.ca/school/marionmgraham

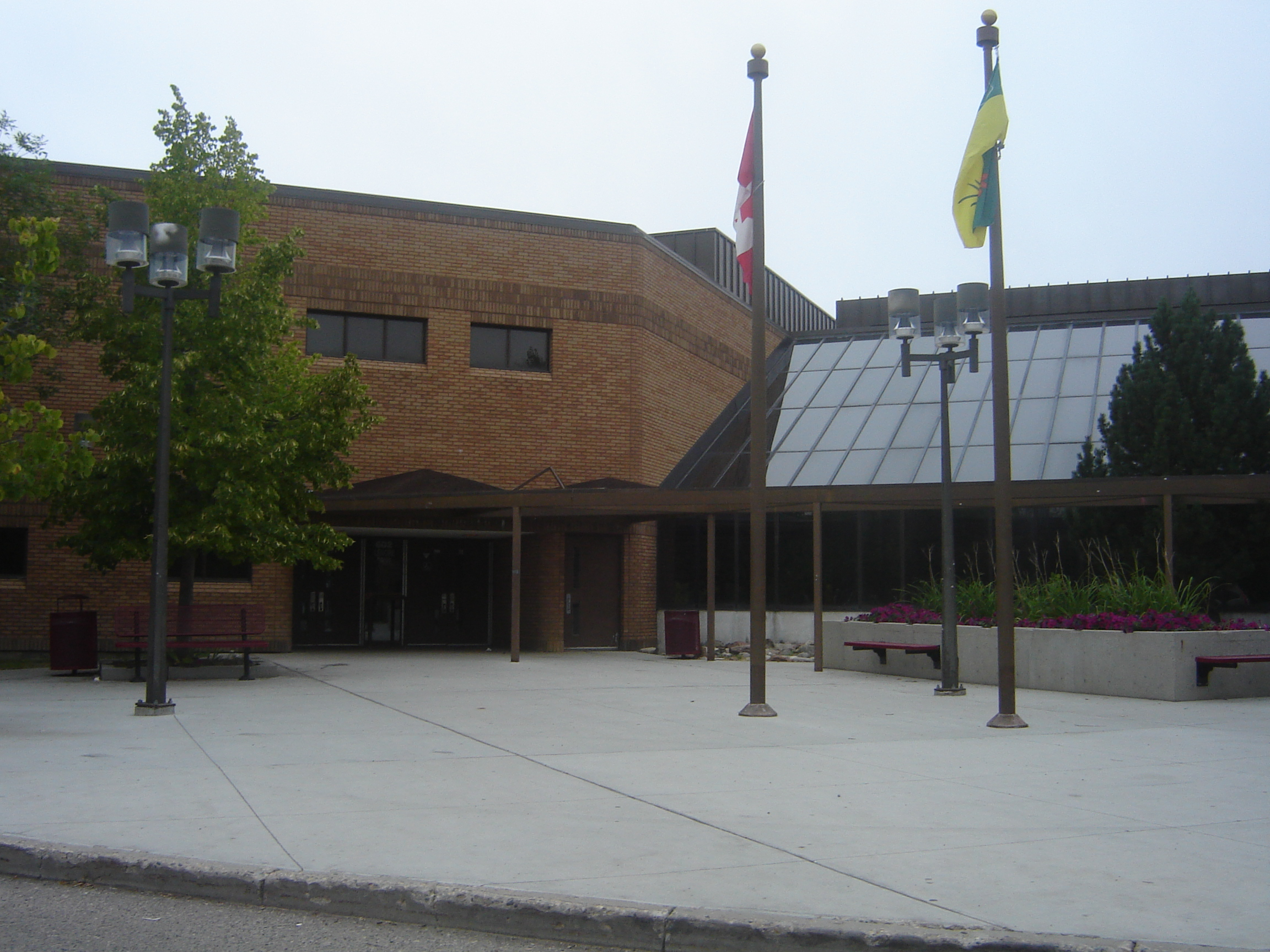

Marion M. Graham Collegiate is the only public high school in the north end of Saskatoon, Saskatchewan, Canada serving the Silverwood Heights, Lawson Heights, River Heights, Richmond Heights, and North Park neighbourhoods. Former Prime Minister Jean Chrétien visited Marion M. Graham Collegiate in 1999, Marion M. Graham Collegiate is also known as Marion Graham or Graham or MMGCI

This school has the distinguished honor of having the first French Immersion graduation class in the Saskatoon Public School Division in 1993. Its main focuses are in the arts, and athletics. Marion Graham has a wide range of artistic classes including visual arts, dance, photography, music, design, theatre arts, carving classes, industrial arts and more.

Currently its feeder schools are Brownell School, Lawson Heights School, North Park Wilson School, River Heights School and Silverwood Heights School.

== History ==
Marion M. Graham Collegiate Institute was opened in September 1984 by the Governor General of Canada, Jeanne Sauvé. The school is named after Marion Margaret Graham OC, an educator who taught in Saskatoon for thirty years and served as a member of the Saskatoon Public School Board from 1967 to 1982. During these years she worked for the development of learning resource centers in Saskatoon public schools, a service that is now available to all students. Graham also volunteered with the Air Cadet Movement, the St. John Ambulance Association, the YMCA, and the United Way.

== Sports ==
Marion M. Graham Collegiate offers the following sports to students.

Season	Junior Sports (9-10)	Senior Sports (9-12)
Fall	Boys & Girls Cross Country; Boys Volleyball; Girls Volleyball; Football	Boys & Girls Cross Country; Boys Volleyball; Girls Volleyball; Football; Girls Soccer; Golf
Winter	Boys Basketball; Girls Basketball	Boys & Girls Wrestling; Boys Basketball; Girls Basketball; Boys Curling; Girls Curling; Cheerleading
Spring	Boys & Girls Badminton; Boys & Girls Track & Field; Boys Soccer; Golf	
Year Round	Esports	Esports

The following is a list of the championships that Marion M. Graham Collegiate has won throughout its existence.

Sport	City Championships	Provincial Championships
Sr Boys Basketball	'15	
Sr Girls Basketball	'08	
Sr Boys Volleyball	'91, '92, '93, '07, '08	'93
Sr Girls Volleyball	'11, '12, '13	
Girls Curling	'89, '91, '96, '98, '00, '01, '02, '03, '06, '07, '14	
Boys Curling	'94, '02, '06, '08, '14	
Girls Wrestling	'99, '00	
Boys Wrestling	'00, '12, '13	'00, '12
Badminton	'87, '88, '89, '91, '92, '93, '94, '95, '96, '97, '98, '99, '02, '03	
Sr Boys Soccer	'13, '14, '15	
Sr Girls Soccer	'90, '00	'00
Cheer/Pom	'06, '07, '08, '09, '15, '16	'06, '09
Football	'88, '90, '07, '08, '09, '14	'88, '90, '09

=== Arts ===
Marion M. Graham Collegiate offers the following Arts to students.

Activity	Grades
Boys Choir	9 – 12
Girls Choir	9 – 10
Mixed Choir	9 – 12
Jr. Concert Band	9 – 10
Sr. Jazz Ensemble	9 – 12
Drumline	9 – 12

Musicals performed by the arts department include:

Year	Name
1992	Grease
1993	West Side Story
1994	Bye Bye Birdie
1995	Guys and Dolls
1996	South Pacific
1997	Oklahoma
1998	Crazy for You
1999	Anything Goes
2000	Good News
2001	Lady be Good
2002	Footloose
2003	Strike up the Band
2005	Copacabana
2006	Area 51
2007	Grease
2008	High School Musical
2009	Crazy for You
2010	West Side Story
2011	Guys and Dolls
2012	Beauty and the Beast
2013	Fame
2014	All Shook Up
2015	Aladdin
2016	Anything Goes
2017	Footloose
