= Lawson Heights Mall =

- The Mall at Lawson Heights
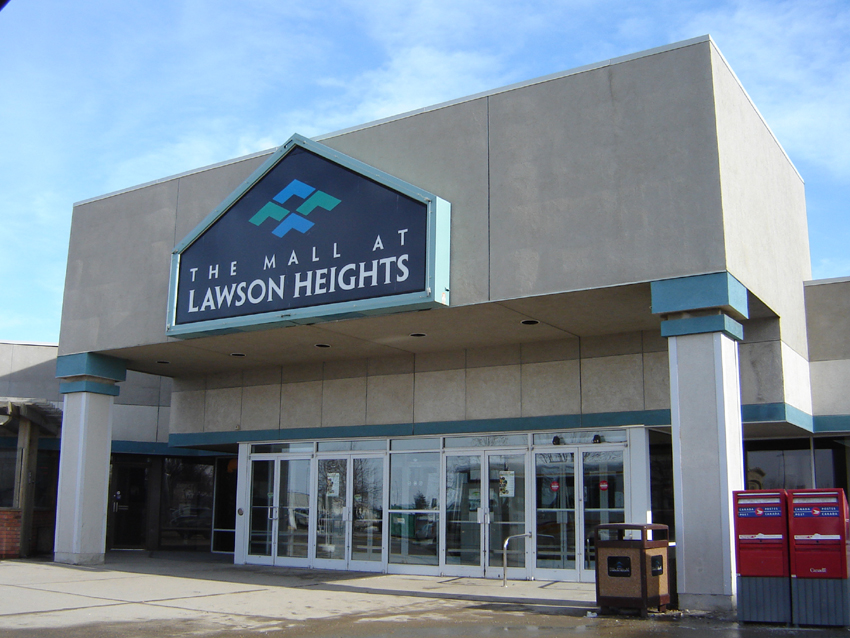
- Lawson Heights Mall in 2007, under The Mall at Lawson Heights branding.
- Location: Saskatoon, Saskatchewan, Canada
- Coordinates: 52°10′06″N 106°39′23″W
- Address: 134 Primrose Drive
- Opened: 1980 renovated 1990, 2002
- Owner: Morguard Investments Ltd.
- Num. of stores: 97
- Num. of anchor tenants: 3 Canada Safeway, Dollarama, London Drugs
- Floor area: 307,089 square feet / 28,529.5 m²
- Floors: 1
- Parking: 1800 parking stalls; free above ground parking
- Website: www.mallatlawsonheights.com

Lawson Heights Mall (formerly branded The Mall at Lawson Heights) is a shopping centre located at the junction of Warman Road and Primrose Drive in north Saskatoon, Saskatchewan in the Lawson Heights Suburban Centre neighbourhood. It is currently anchored by Canada Safeway and London Drugs, and has almost 100 shops and services. A third anchor bay housed a Zellers department store from the mall's opening until October 2012; it was later replaced by a Target store until the Canadian Target chain closed in 2015.

The mall opened in October 1980 during a period of rapid growth in the city's north end subdivisions. On opening it covered 23,225 square metres and had the first enclosed food court in Saskatoon, along with many independent and franchise chains (including the city's first purpose-built mall video arcade) and was promoted as one of the province's largest suburban malls; it also boasted the largest Safeway store in Saskatchewan. Future plans for the mall at the time were for a second department store to join Zellers in a future phase, but ultimately Zellers (later Target) remained the only department store in the mall. The mall underwent a major expansion in 1990 that nearly doubled its footprint, though in lieu of a new anchor tenant, a new food court was built. A further expansion in 2002 added London Drugs as the mall's third anchor.

In September 2011 it was reported that Target Canada, as part of its takeover of the Zellers chain, had purchased the leasehold for the Lawson Heights location with the possibility of it being converted to a Target store in the future. This was later confirmed and the Zellers location closed in October 2012 to permit an expansion of the location to the west and south to accommodate the larger Target store. The Target store opened in the summer of 2013, but closed in early April 2015, leaving the mall's third anchor location vacant until the Safeway store relocated to the old Target location in 2018. Motion Fitness now occupies Safeway's original location.

== References and external links ==
- Tourism Saskatoon - Mall at Lawson Heights
- Lawson Heights Mall Expansion

== See also ==
- List of shopping malls in Saskatoon
