= Exhibition, Saskatoon =

Exhibition
- Neighbourhood
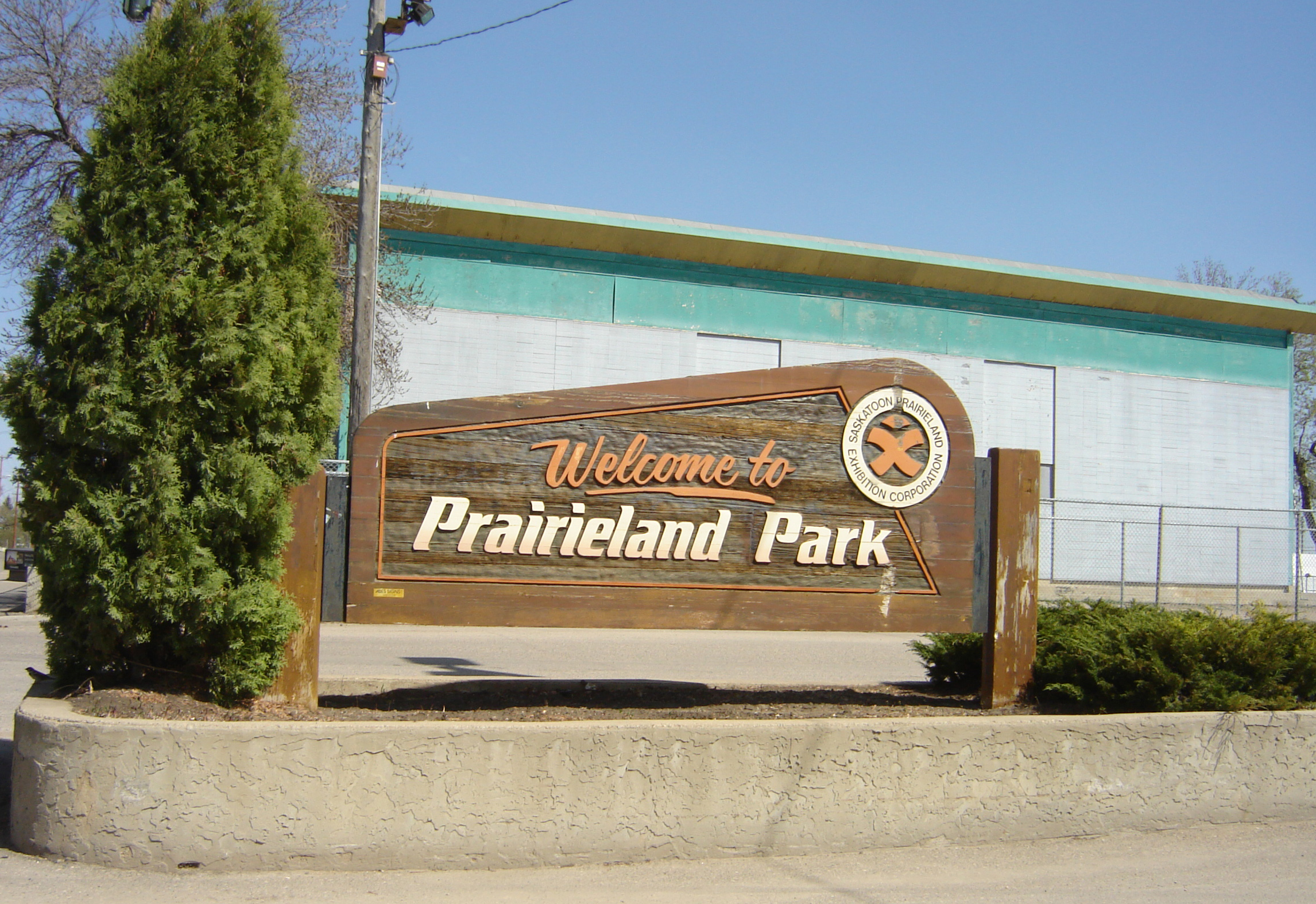
- Welcome to Prairieland Park
- Interactive map of Exhibition
- Coordinates: 52°6′13″N 106°40′24″W
- Country: Canada
- Province: Saskatchewan
- City: Saskatoon
- Suburban Development Area: Nutana
- Neighbourhood: Exhibition
- Construction: 1921-1945

Government
  - Type: Municipal (Ward 7)
  - Administrative body: Saskatoon City Council
  - Councillor: Holly Kelleher

Population (2025)
  - Total: 2,757
  - Median personal income: $50,400
- Time zone: UTC-6 (UTC)
- Website: Queen Elizabeth Exhibition Haultain Community Association

The Exhibition subdivision of Saskatoon, Saskatchewan, Canada, is located on the banks of the South Saskatchewan River and was developed between the two major World Wars. To the west is the Diefenbaker Management Area which boasts the Diefenbaker park and Pioneer Cemetery. The park includes a medium-sized hill which is used for tobogganing and snowboarding, and the park itself is a frequently used venue for picnics and public events and performances. The Exhibition community is also known as Thornton, after a (now-demolished) public elementary school that formerly served the area and early in its history also went by the name Bellevue.

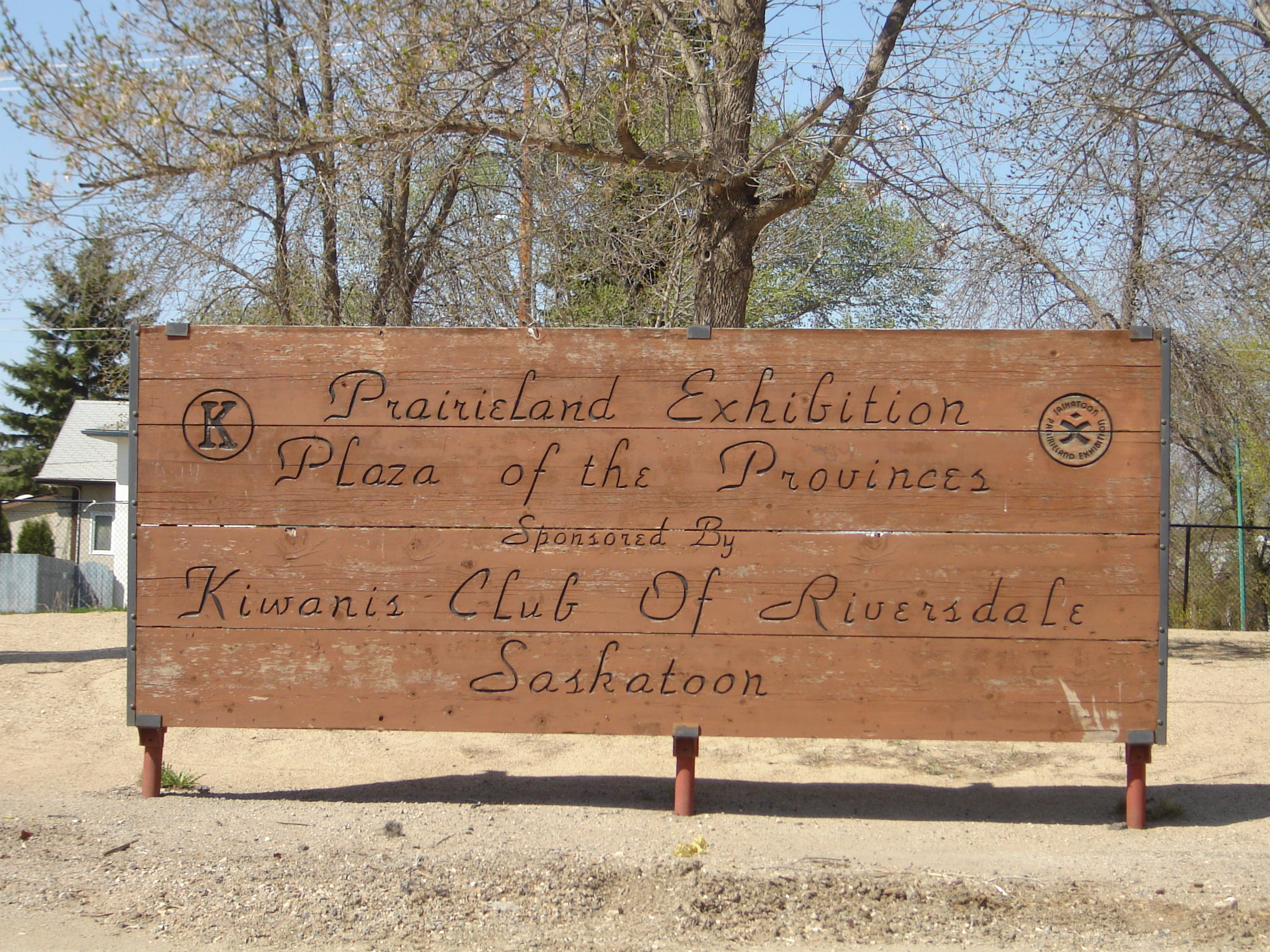
Prairieland Exhibition. Plaza of the Provinces. Sponsored by Kiwanis Club of Riversdale.

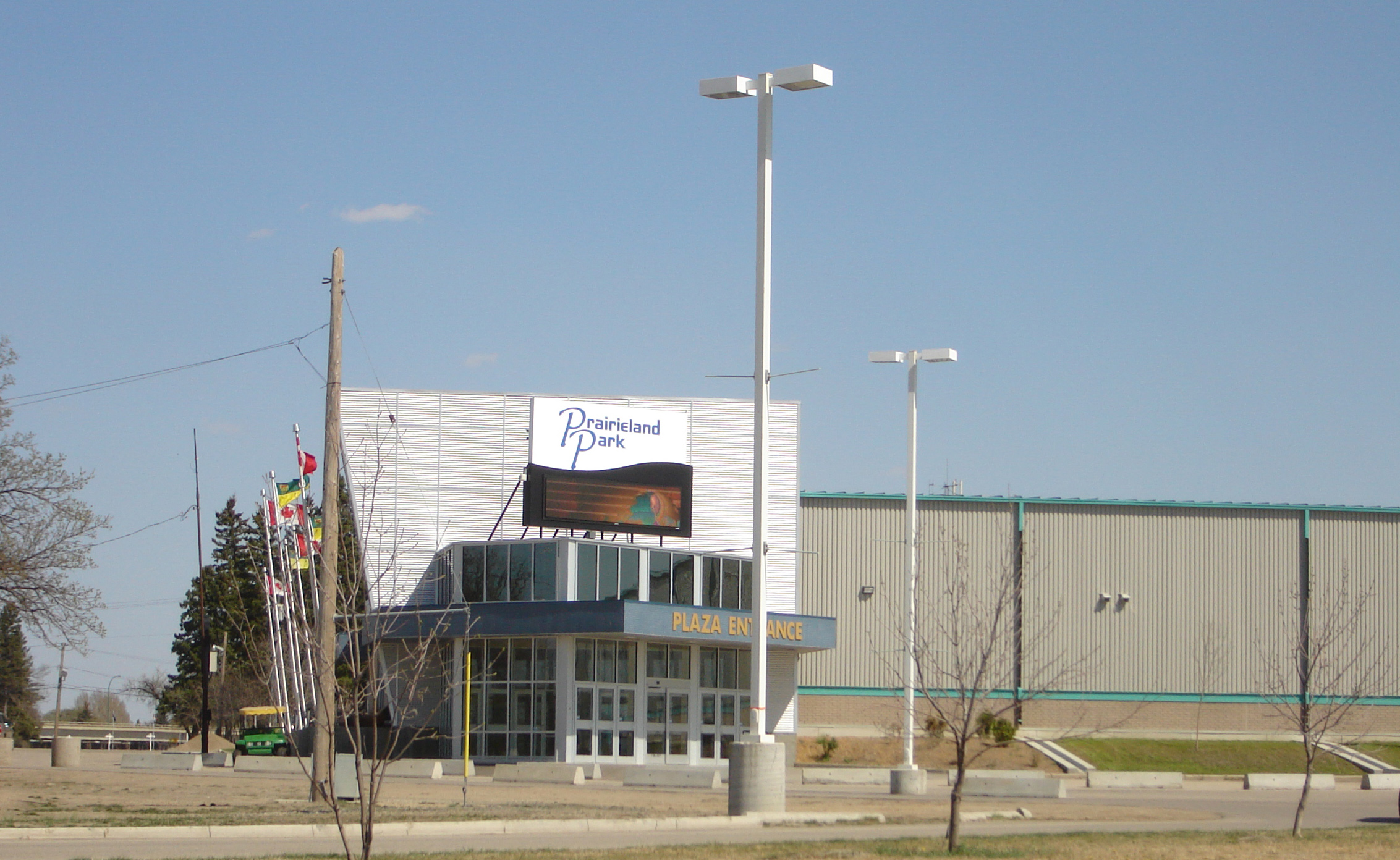
Prairieland Park

== History ==
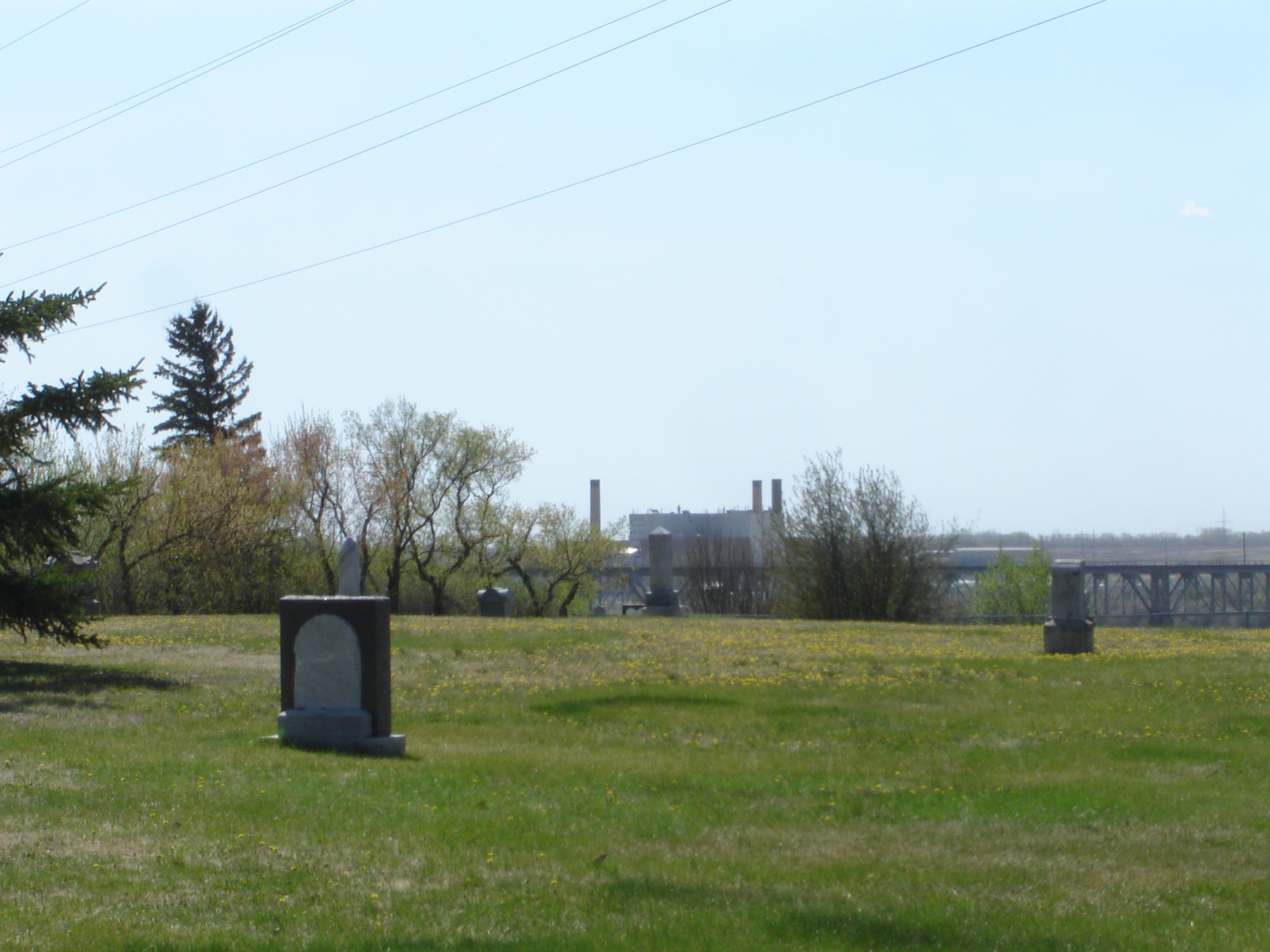
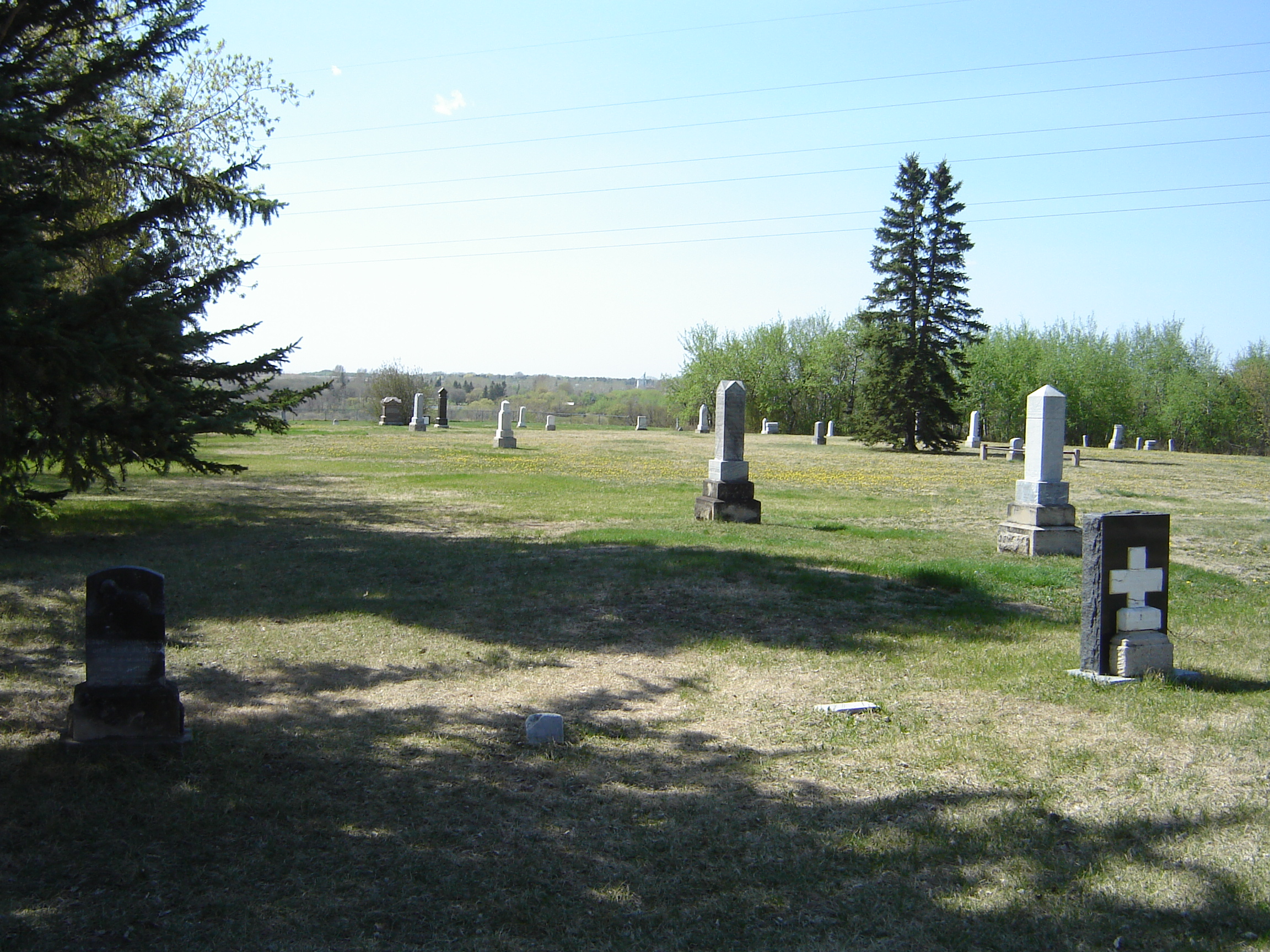
Pioneer Cemetery

The Pioneer Cemetery received its first interment in 1884. On June 20, 1905, the Nutana Cemetery Co was awarded a special grant at SW Section 20 Township 36 Range 5 W of the 3rd Meridian. The Pioneer Cemetery was also called the Nutana Cemetery, and was the first municipal cemetery for the City of Saskatoon until 1910 when Woodlawn Cemetery became the city cemetery. The Pioneer Cemetery was declared a heritage site in 1982.

Exhibition, Saskatoon, Saskatchewan is at coordinates 52.103611°N 106.673333°W

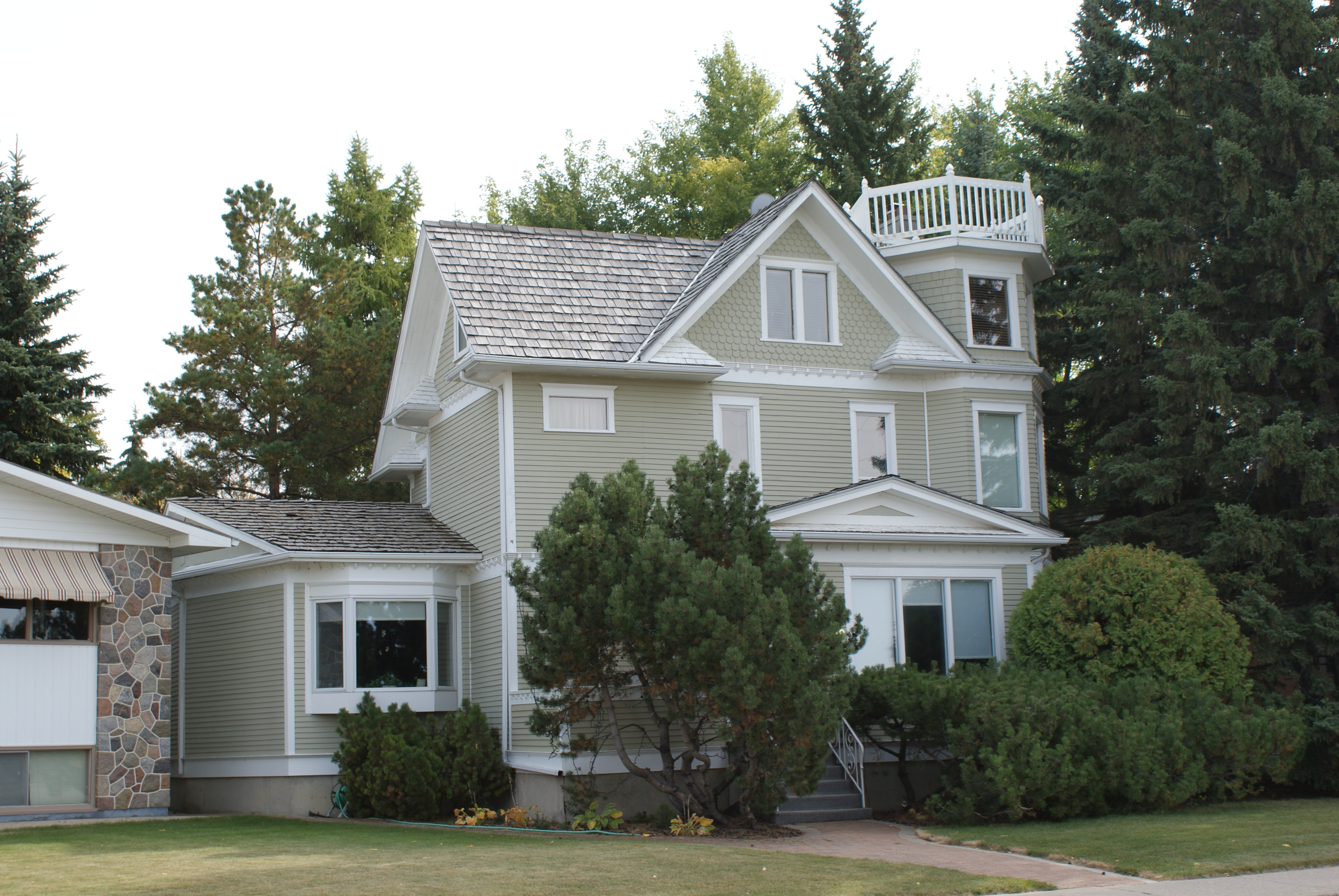
Pendygrasse Home

Sarah Shatwell Pendygrasse arrived from England in 1887 and was awarded a dominion land grant patent at SE section 20 township 36 range 5 W of the 3rd meridian, Saskatchewan provisional district, North West Territories, on December 12, 1892. Her son Harold L. S. Pendygrasse had a homestead at NE Section 20 township 35 Range 3 W of the 3rd meridian. At 1919 St. Henry Avenue, Exhibition subdivision the Pendygrasse Home built by Harold Pendygrasse in 1910 has been declared a municipal heritage site. It is built on the banks of the South Saskatchewan river east side of Saskatoon.

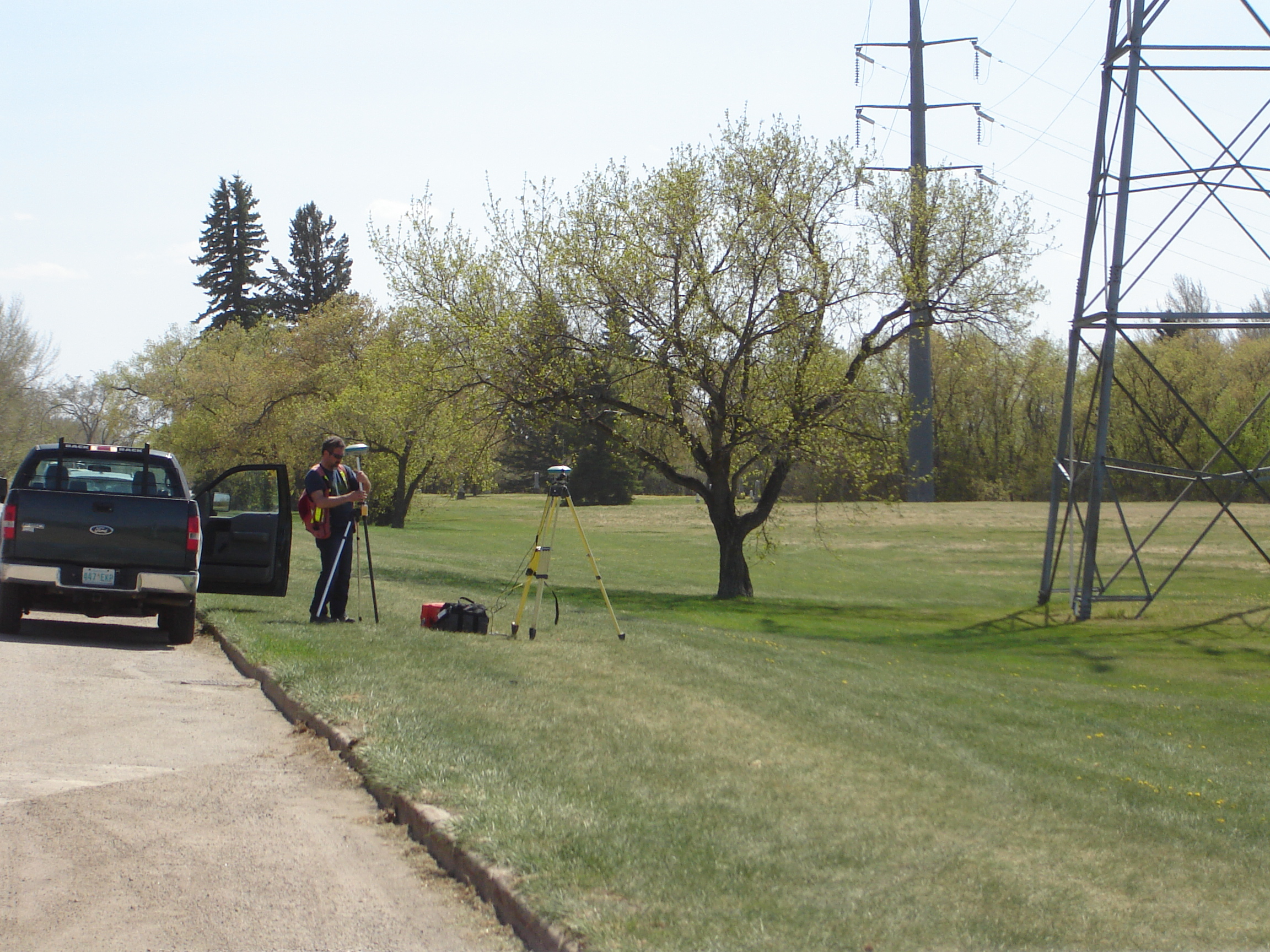
Surveyor

For many years, the community was known by the name Bellevue, and this is how it was listed in the Henderson's Directory up until as late as the 1940s.

Construction of the Idylwyld Freeway in the 1960s resulted in the Exhibition community being physically bisected, with several streets (most notably Coy and St. George Avenues, along with Adelaide, Hilliard and Isabella Streets) being realigned and what was at one time the city's main CN Rail line being removed. Only two east-west streets provide access to the western section of the community: Taylor Street West and Ruth Street West. In the 1980s, the city attempted to relocate the Exhibition Grounds to the north end of the city, opening the Exhibition Grounds up for residential development; voters defeated this plan in a plebiscite.

== Public services ==
Saskatoon Light and Power provides electrical utilities to all Saskatoon neighbourhoods which existed prior to 1958. Water is treated and supplied by the City of Saskatoon Water and Wastewater Treatment Branch. The Exhibition neighbourhood is a part of the East Division of the Saskatoon Police Services patrol system. This division services east of the South Saskatchewan River which encompasses the thirty one neighbourhoods, two industrial areas. The three Saskatoon hospitals are located in other nearby neighbourhoods. St. Paul's Hospital in the Central Division oversees the Central Business District, the Riversdale Business District, SIAST and nine other residential areas. The Exhibition neighbourhood is served by the City of Saskatoon Saskatoon Fire & Protective Services.

== Demographics ==
As of 2025, the area is home to 2,757 residents. The neighbourhood is considered a middle-income area, with a median personal income of $50,400, and a home ownership rate of 54.0%.

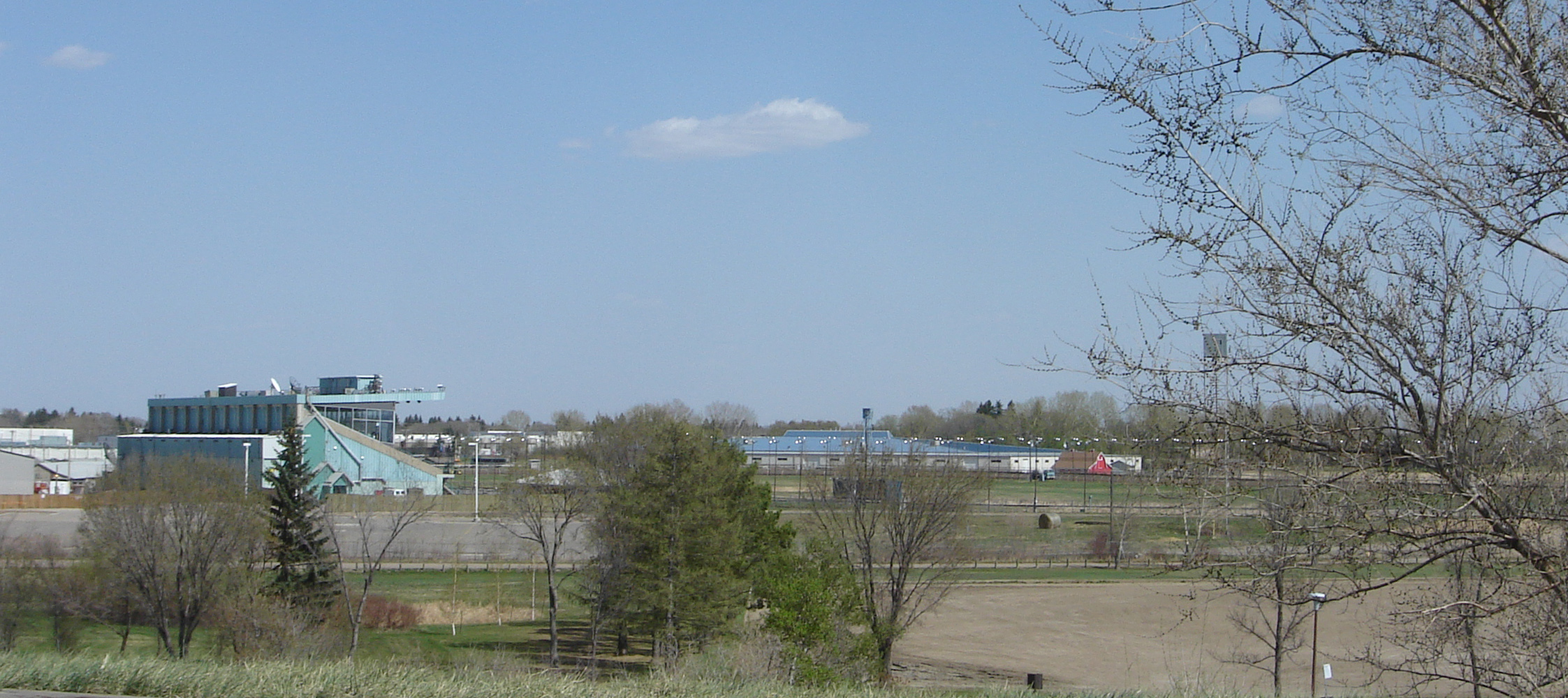
Marquis Down Race Track in Prairieland Park

== Governance ==
The exhibition exists within the federal electoral district of Saskatoon—Grasswood. It is currently represented by Kevin Waugh of the Conservative Party of Canada, first elected in 2015.

Provincially, the area is mostly within the constituency of Saskatoon Nutana. It is currently represented by Erika Ritchie of the Saskatchewan New Democratic Party, first elected in 2020. The southern portion of the neighbourhood which includes Diefenbaker Park and the Prairieland Exhibition grounds sit within the boundaries of Saskatoon Stonebridge.

In Saskatoon's non-partisan municipal politics, the area lies within ward 7. It is currently represented by Councillor Holly Kelleher, who was elected to city council in 2024.

The Queen Elizabeth Exhibition Haultain Community Association is formed of volunteers in the community and may petition the councillor, MLA or MP regarding infrastructure or public services for the neighbourhood.

== Geography ==
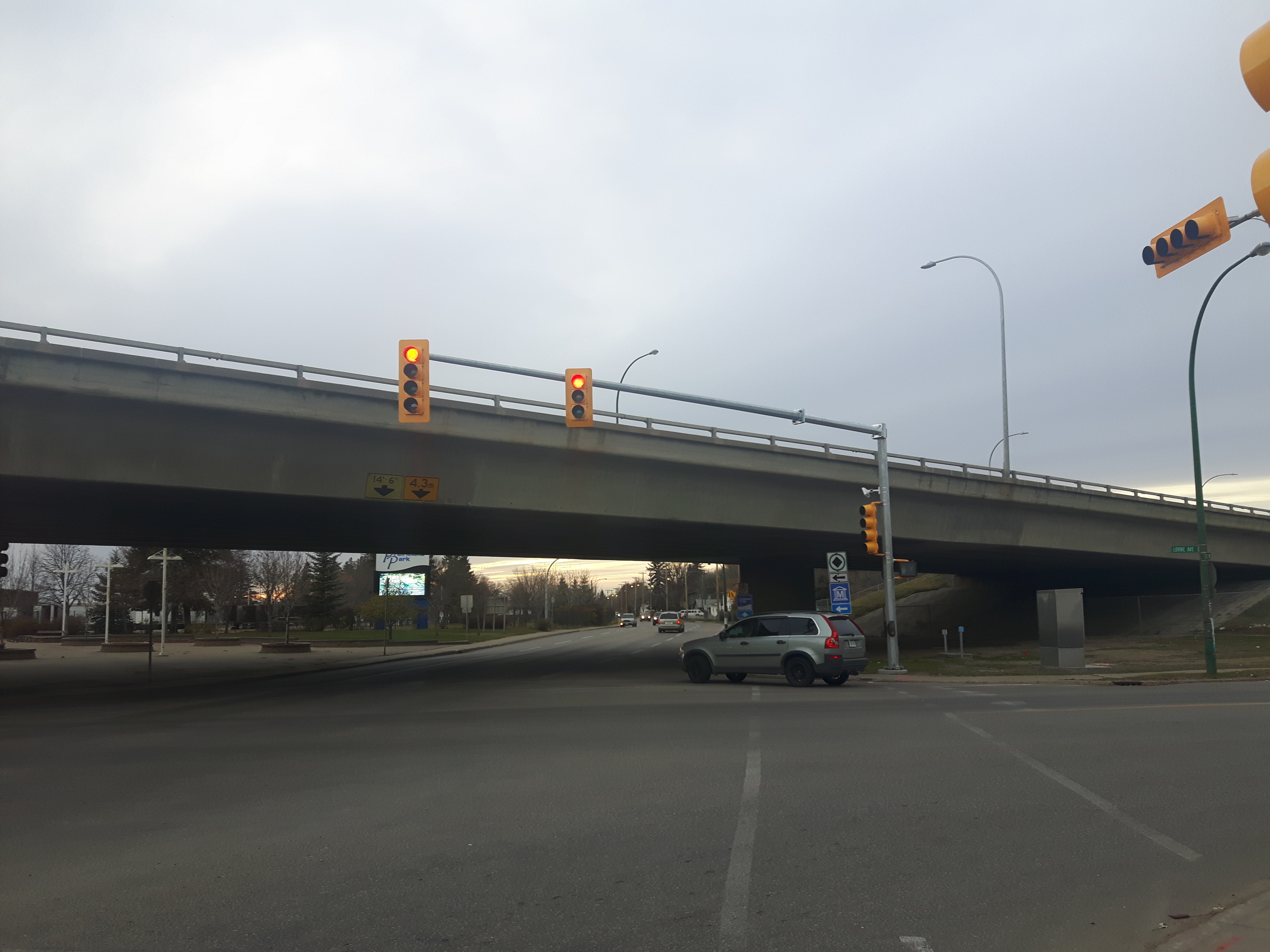
Traffic signals at Lorne Avenue & Ruth Street

The Exhibition area is at an elevation of 305 m (1,000 ft 8 in) and is located on the east river bank of the South Saskatchewan River. It is located 2.65 miles (4.26 km) from Down Town Saskatoon.

The northern boundary is Taylor Street, and as previously mentioned, the western boundary is the South Saskatchewan River. The eastern edge is Melrose Avenue, and to the south are Ruth Street, the Prairieland Park and the Saskatchewan Western Development Museum.

Achs Park, 1.82 acres (7,400 m^{2}); Exhibition Park, 3.13 acres (12,700 m^{2}) and Thornton Park, 2.00 acres (8,100 m^{2}) are the three main parks in the neighbourhood. The Meewasin Valley Authority is developing parks and walk ways along the South Saskatchewan River. Along the west boundary of the Exhibition neighbourhood is Gabriel Dumont park as well as trails at the top and base of the riverbank.

== Education ==
Riverside Christian School
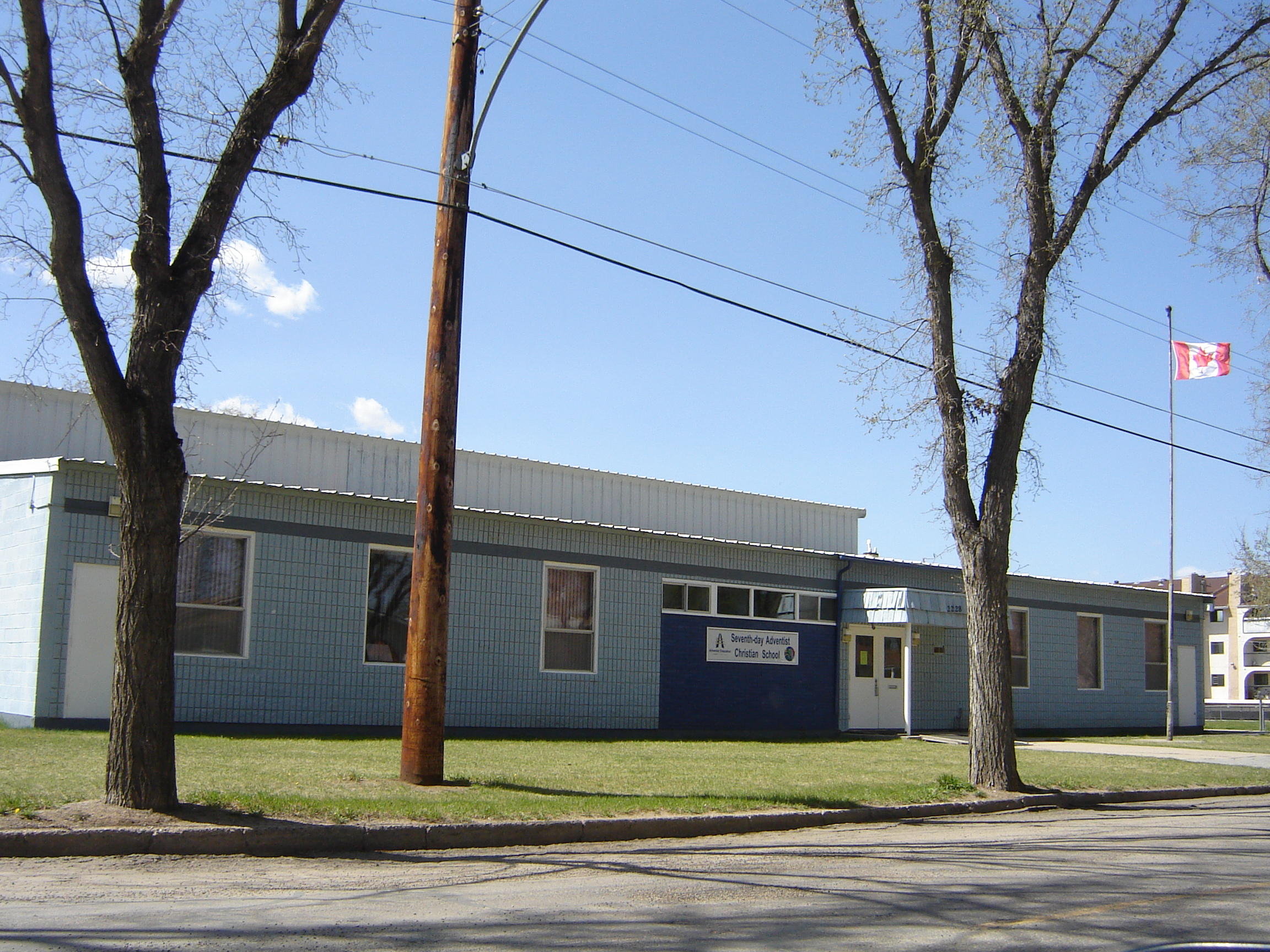

Location
- 2228 Herman Avenue; Saskatoon, Saskatchewan, S7M 0N3; Canada

Information
- Religious affiliation: Seventh-day Adventist
- Principal: Andrew Savenye
- Grades: Kindergarten to Grade 9
- Education system: Private
- Language: English
- Website: Riverside Christian School

- Riverside Christian School - private elementary, governed by the Manitoba-Saskatchewan Conference of the Seventh-day Adventist Church

The area's public elementary school, Thornton School, was decommissioned in 1986 and demolished in 1997. Students in the area who attend the public school are bussed to Queen Elizabeth School.

The area's separate (Catholic) elementary school, St. Frances Cree Bilingual School, first opened in January 1953. It was the largest Catholic elementary school in the division from 1967 to 1969, serving 505 students in 17 classrooms. As the Exhibition area and surrounding neighbourhoods matured in the 1970s, enrolment declined. In 2007, Cree language and cultural programming was first offered. Adding one grade per year, the program grew from 40 to over 600 students from over 50 Saskatoon neighbourhoods in 12 years.

Having long outgrown its current facility, the province announced planning and design funding to replace St. Frances school in March 2020. The site of Sion Middle School in the nearby Holliston neighbourhood was selected for the replacement school, and Sion Middle School was demolished in fall 2021 in preparation for construction. At the start of the 2025-2026 school year, students and staff of St. Frances Cree Bilingual School transitioned to the new awâsisak kâ-nîmîhtocik St. Francis School and the original facility was demolished in early 2026 to make room for a new apartment building complex.

== Commercial ==
Commercial development includes a service station at the corner of Ruth Street and Lorne Avenue, commercial development at Lorne Avenue and Taylor Street, and a number of light-industrial businesses on St. George Avenue and Isabella Street West.

== Arts and culture ==
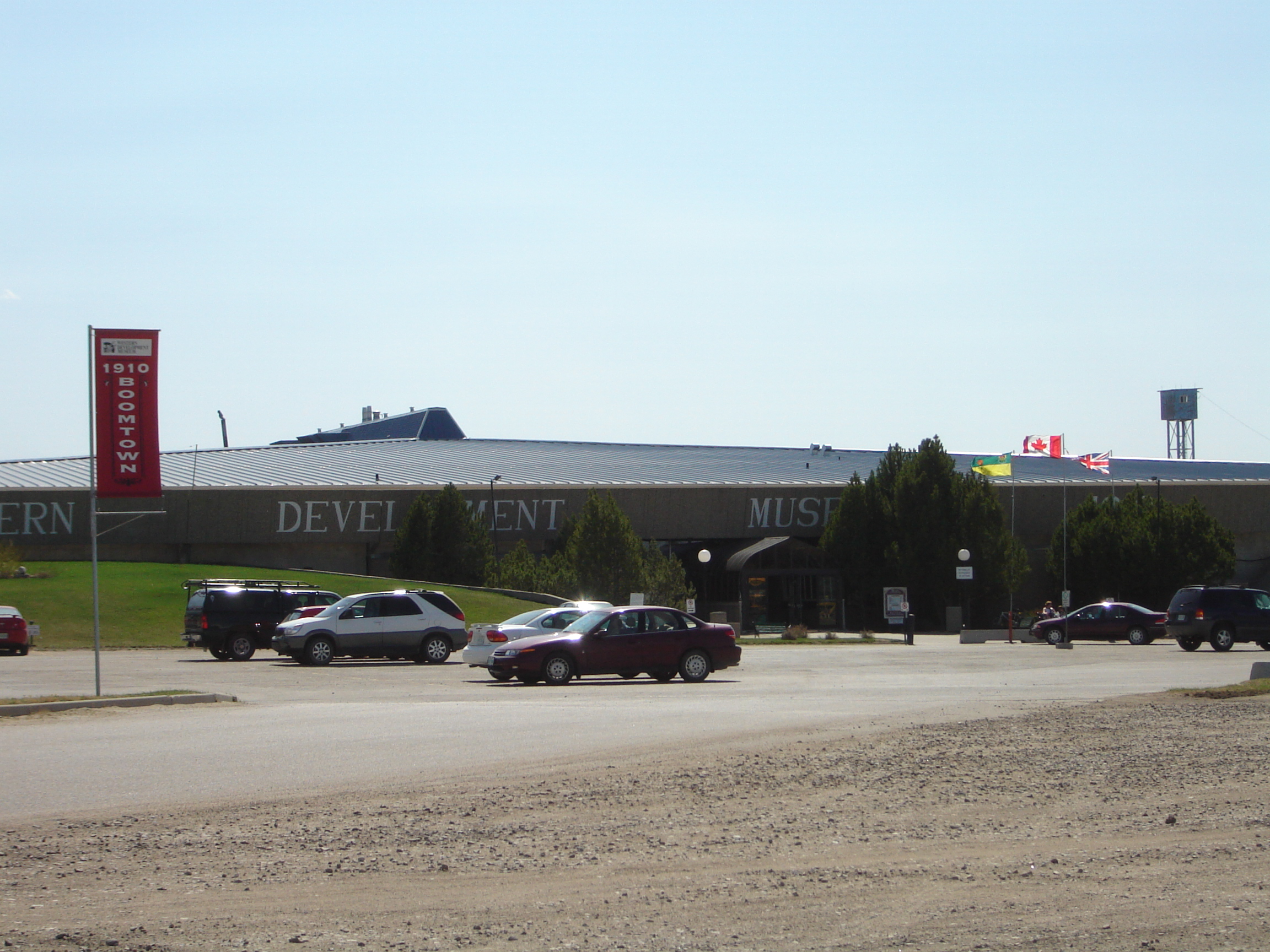
Western Development Museum

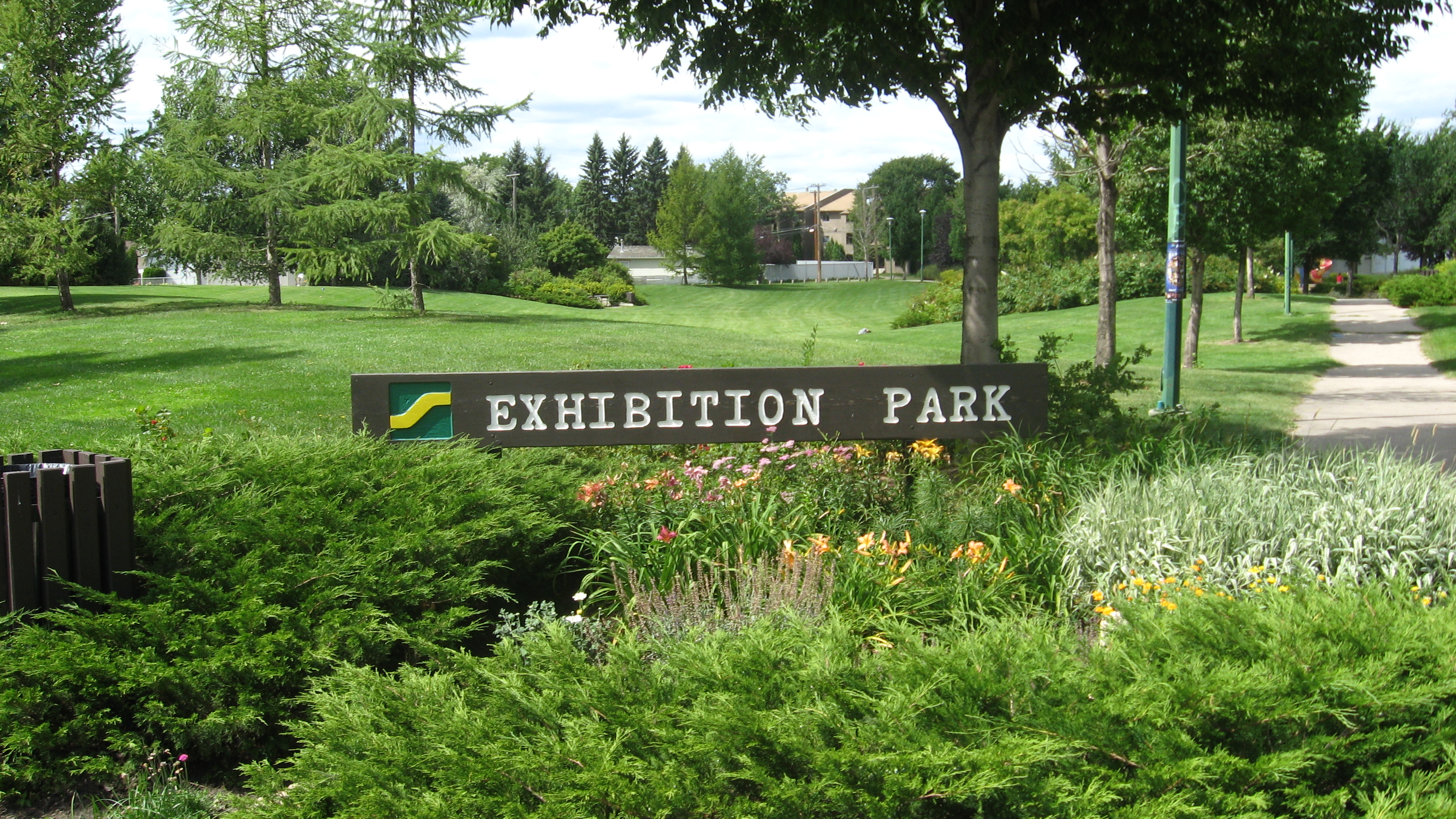
Exhibition park

- The Queen Elizabeth Exhibition Haultain Community Association addresses concerns of the community and provides recreational events and activities year round for all ages.
- Saskatchewan Western Development Museum is also located south of Ruth Street.
- Prairieland Park or Saskatoon Exhibition Grounds are located south of Ruth Street.
