= Diefenbaker Management Area, Saskatoon =

Neighbourhood in Saskatoon, Saskatchewan, Canada

Diefenbaker Management Area
- Neighbourhood
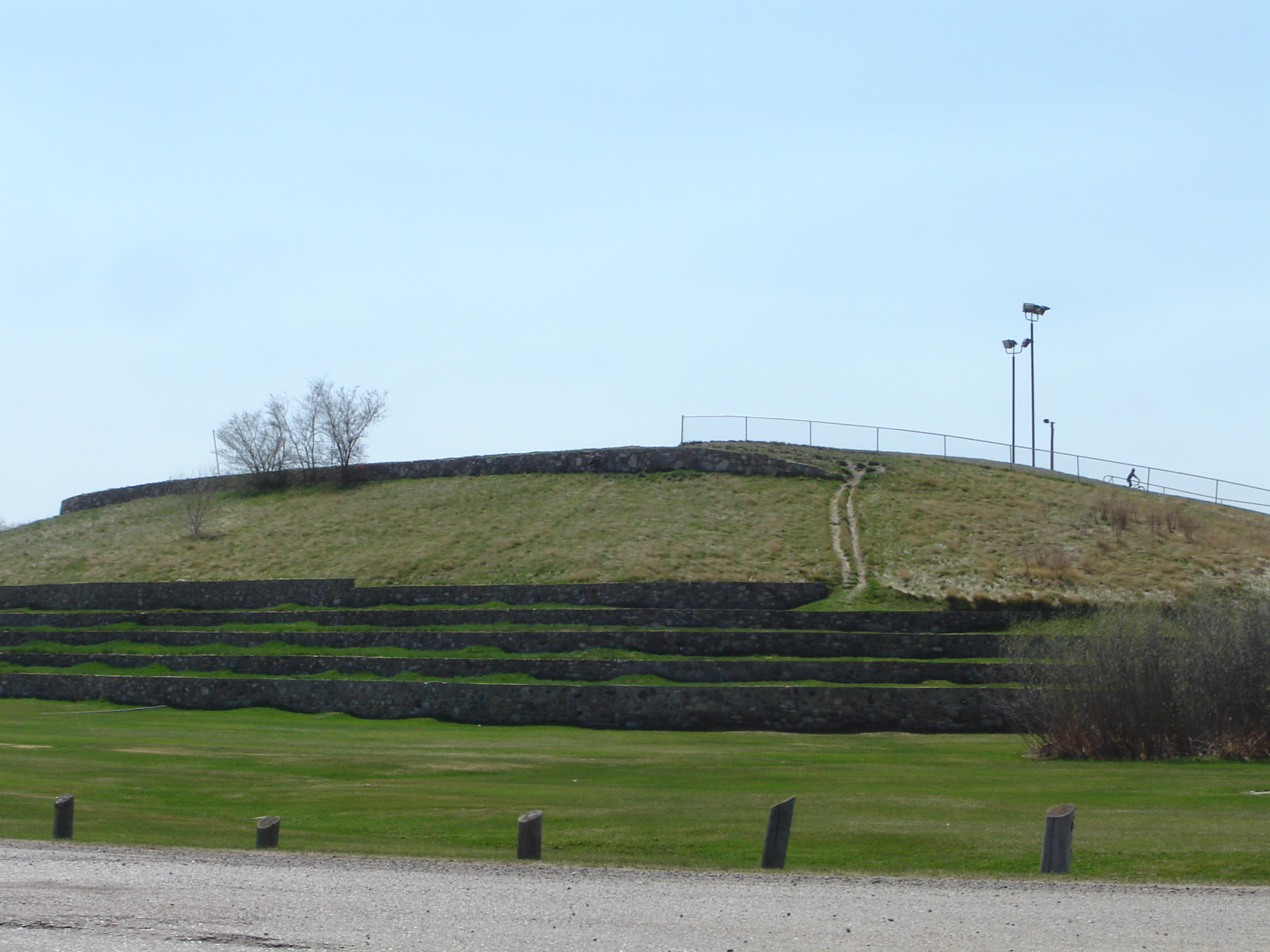
- Diefenbaker Hill in Diefenbaker Park, prior to its 2018-19 redevelopment as Optimist Hill

- Location in Saskatchewan Diefenbaker Management Area (Canada)
- Coordinates: 52°05′48″N 106°41′18″W
- Country: Canada
- Province: Saskatchewan
- City: Saskatoon
- Suburban Development Area: Nutana
- Management Area: Diefenbaker Management Area

Government
  - Type: Municipal (Ward 7)
  - Administrative body: Saskatoon City Council
  - Councillor: Mairin Loewen

Population (2006)
  - Average Income: $
- Time zone: UTC-6 (UTC)
- Website: Exhibition Community Association

The Diefenbaker Management Area is an area of Saskatoon, to the west of the Exhibition subdivision. The area includes Diefenbaker Park and the Nutana Pioneer Cemetery. The park is a frequently used venue for picnics public events, and performances. The park also includes Optimist Hill, which is a hill used for skiing, tobogganing, and snowboarding in the winter.

== Location ==
The Diefenbaker Management Area is located within the Nutana Suburban Development Area. It is bounded by the South Saskatchewan River to the west, St. Henry Avenue to the east, Ruth Street West to the north, and the city limits to the south. The only roads are St. Henry Avenue and the road looping through Diefenbaker Park.

== History ==
The Pioneer Cemetery received its first interment in 1884. On June 20, 1905 the Nutana Cemetery Co was awarded a special grant at SW Section 20 Township 36 Range 5 W of the 3rd Meridian. The Pioneer Cemetery, located west of the intersection of Ruth Street and St. Henry Avenue, was also called the Nutana Cemetery, and was the first municipal cemetery for the city of Saskatoon until 1910 when Woodlawn Cemetery became the city cemetery. The Pioneer Cemetery was declared a heritage site in 1982.

Pioneer Cemetery. Saskatoon's first cemetery was established in 1884, a year after the community was established. It remained in use until 1909 and thereafter only for those who had already established plots. Among the gravestones still standing are those commemorating:
Robert Clark, whose death in 1884 from exhaustion while fighting a prairie fire was the first in the community:
Grace Fletcher, Saskatoon's first business woman and a campaigner for women's rights;
Edward Meeres, who lost his life in 1888 in a blizzard in what is now the centre of Nutana.
Members from many of Saskatoon's other notable pioneer families are buried here. In 1969 a number of graves were moved to Woodlawn Cemetery because of riverbank slumping. City of Saskatoon. Meewasin Valley Authority.

— Image Pioneer Cemetery Plaque

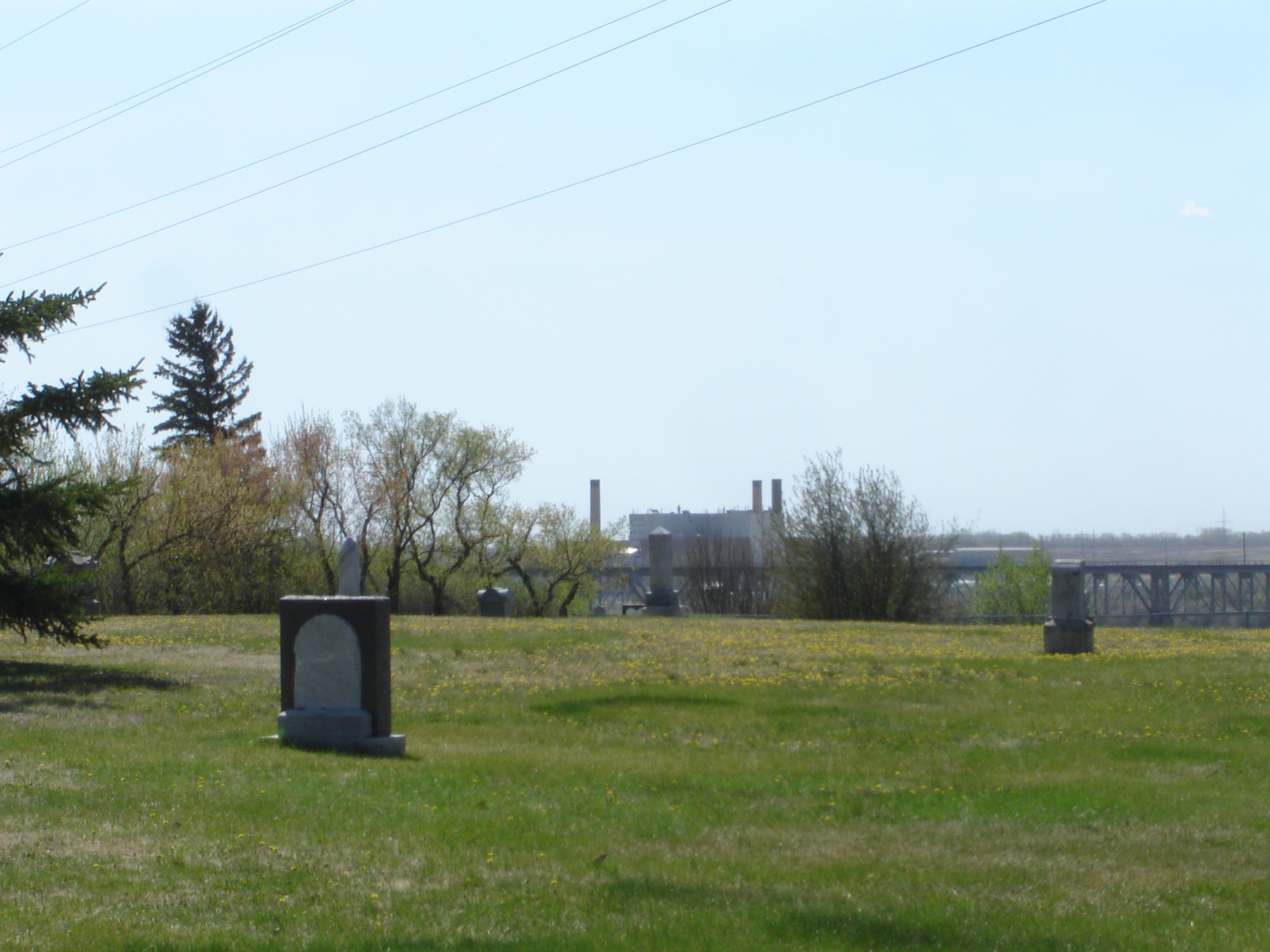
Pioneer Cemetery

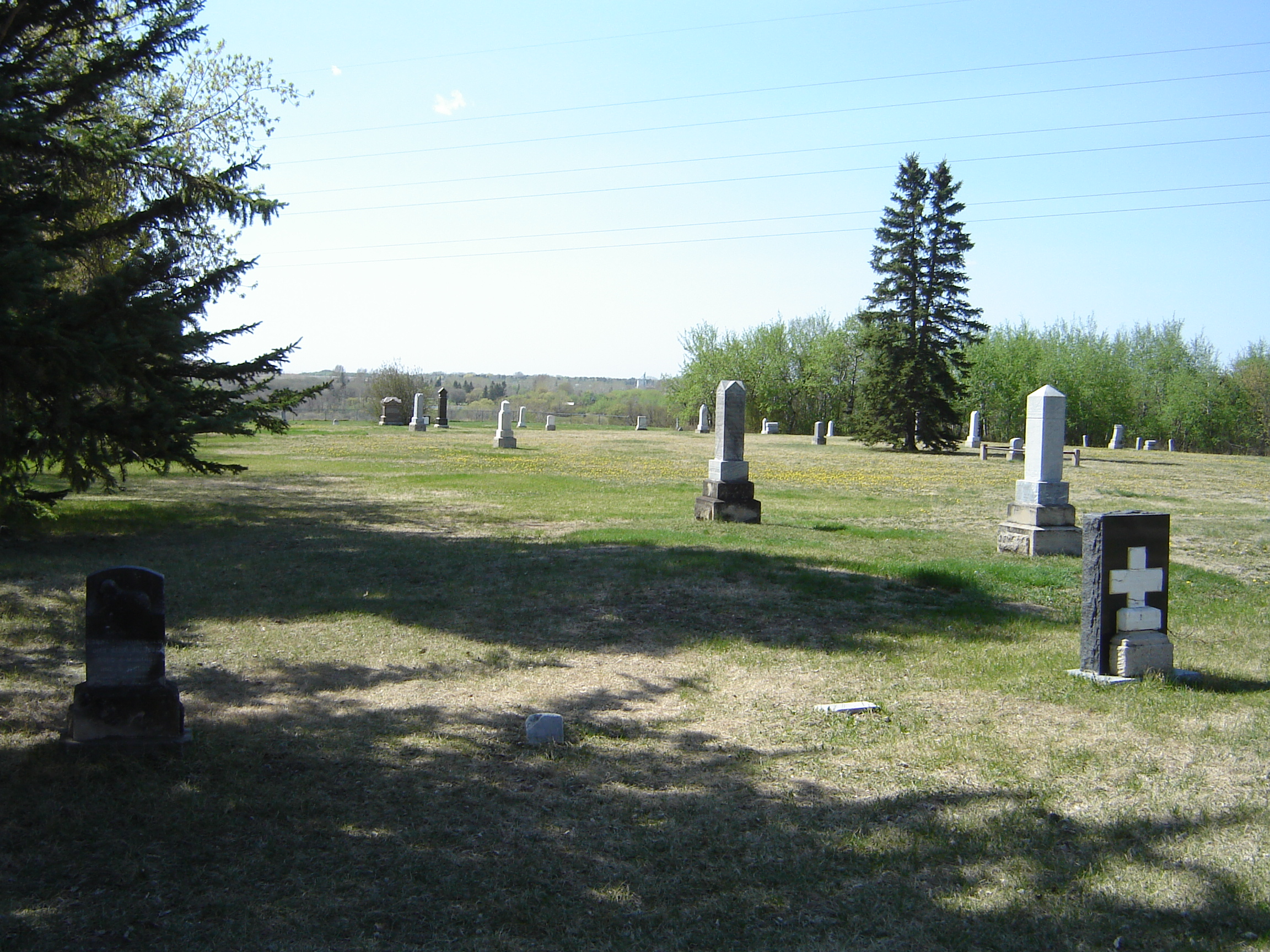
Pioneer Cemetery

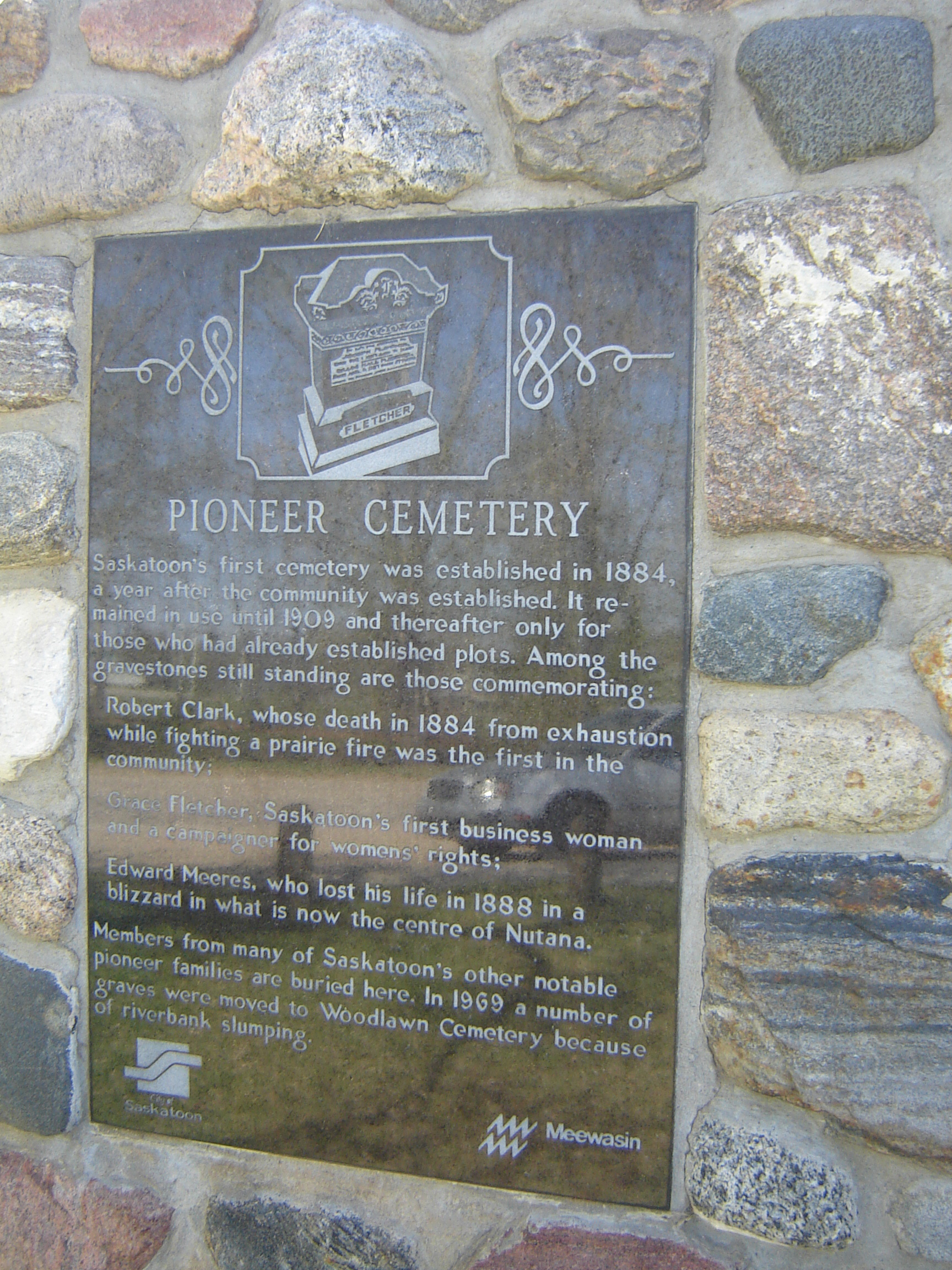
Pioneer Cemetery

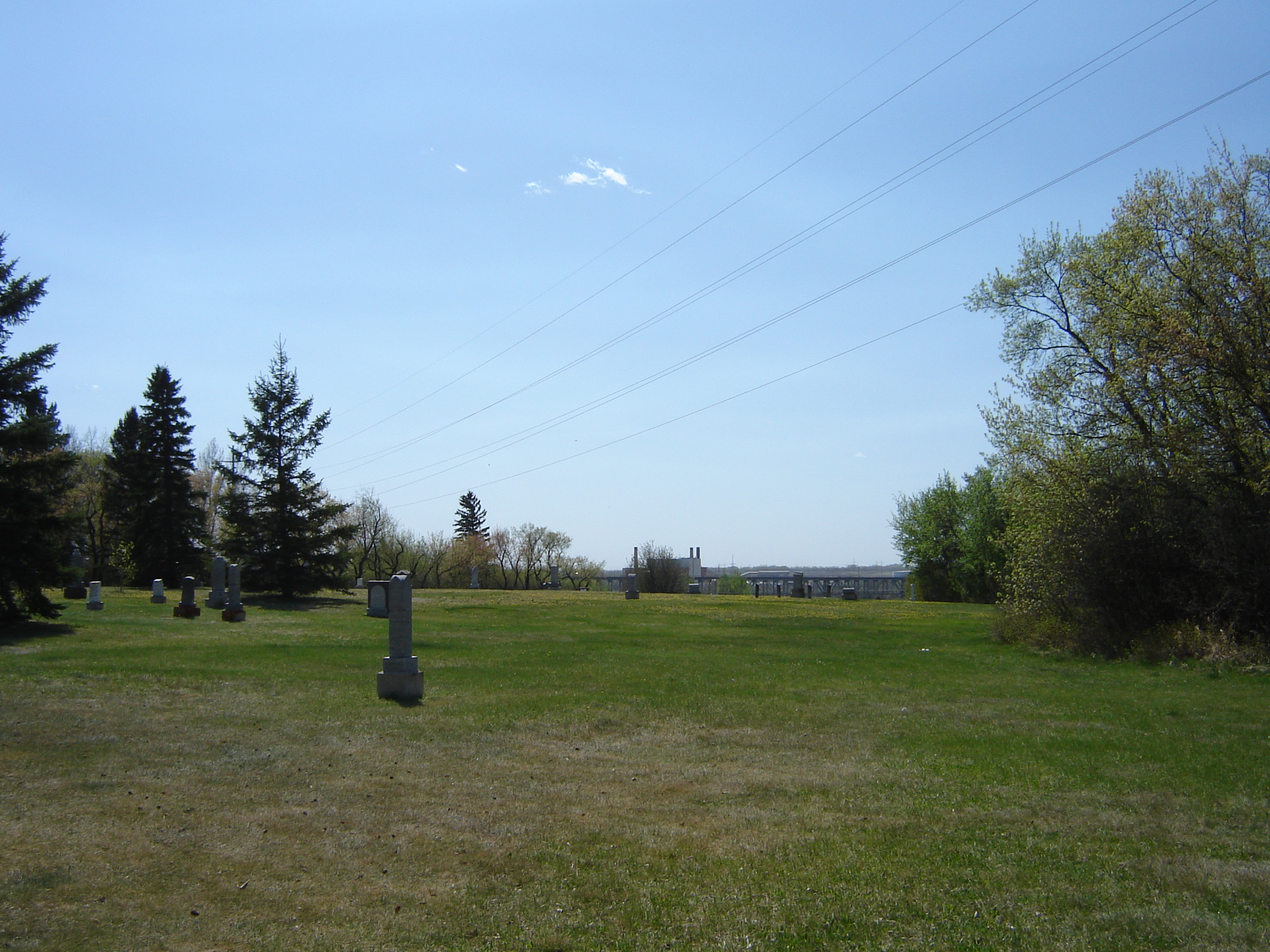
Pioneer Cemetery

The southern portion of Diefenbaker Park has been disrupted by the development nearby of the Circle Drive freeway extension, which removed a strip of the park and now places formerly quiet areas right next to freeway traffic.

In 2018, a large portion of the park, including its hill — now called Optimist Hill — entered a period of reconstruction and redevelopment that saw it reconfigured into a $3 million recreation facility with a ski hill, seasonal chalet, terrain park, and toboggan hill. The facility opened to the public in February 2019. Prior to the redevelopment, the public was allowed to drive to the top of the hill, where a parking lot allowed for a scenic view of the city.

== Events and festivals ==
Diefenbaker park is home to Saskatoon's organized events on Canada Day, consisting of official ceremonies, live entertainment, various activities and nighttime fireworks.

== Optimist Hill ==
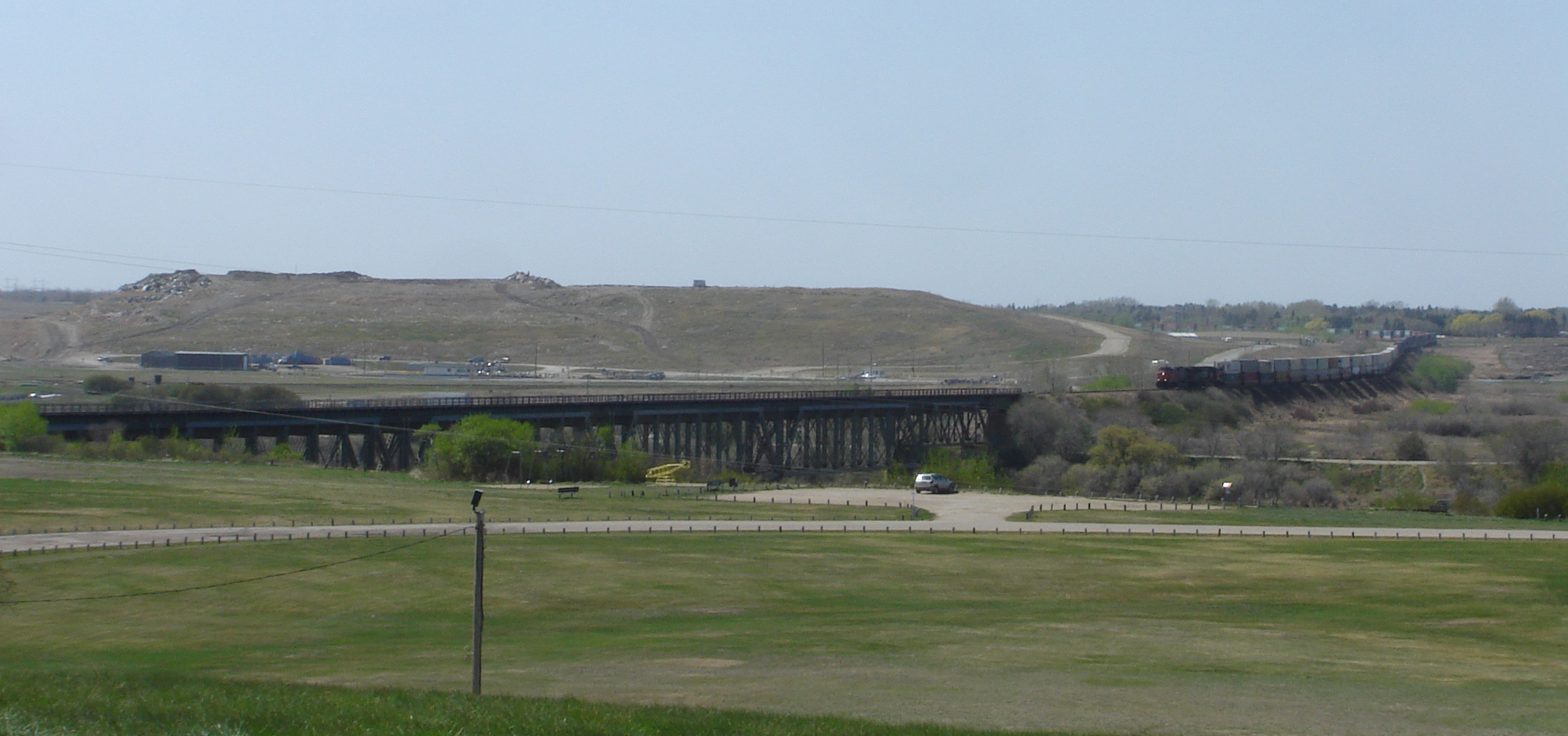
Grand Trunk Bridge with Optimist Hill in the background

Optimist Hill is a small ski area in Diefenbaker Park. It is 21 metres (69 ft) high and has a rope tow lift to the top. There is skiing, snowboarding, tubing lanes, a terrain park, and magic carpet lifts.

== See also ==
- List of ski areas and resorts in Canada
