= Nutana Pioneer Cemetery =

Cemetery in Saskatoon, Saskatchewan, Canada

Coordinates: 51°6′1″N 106°41′0″W

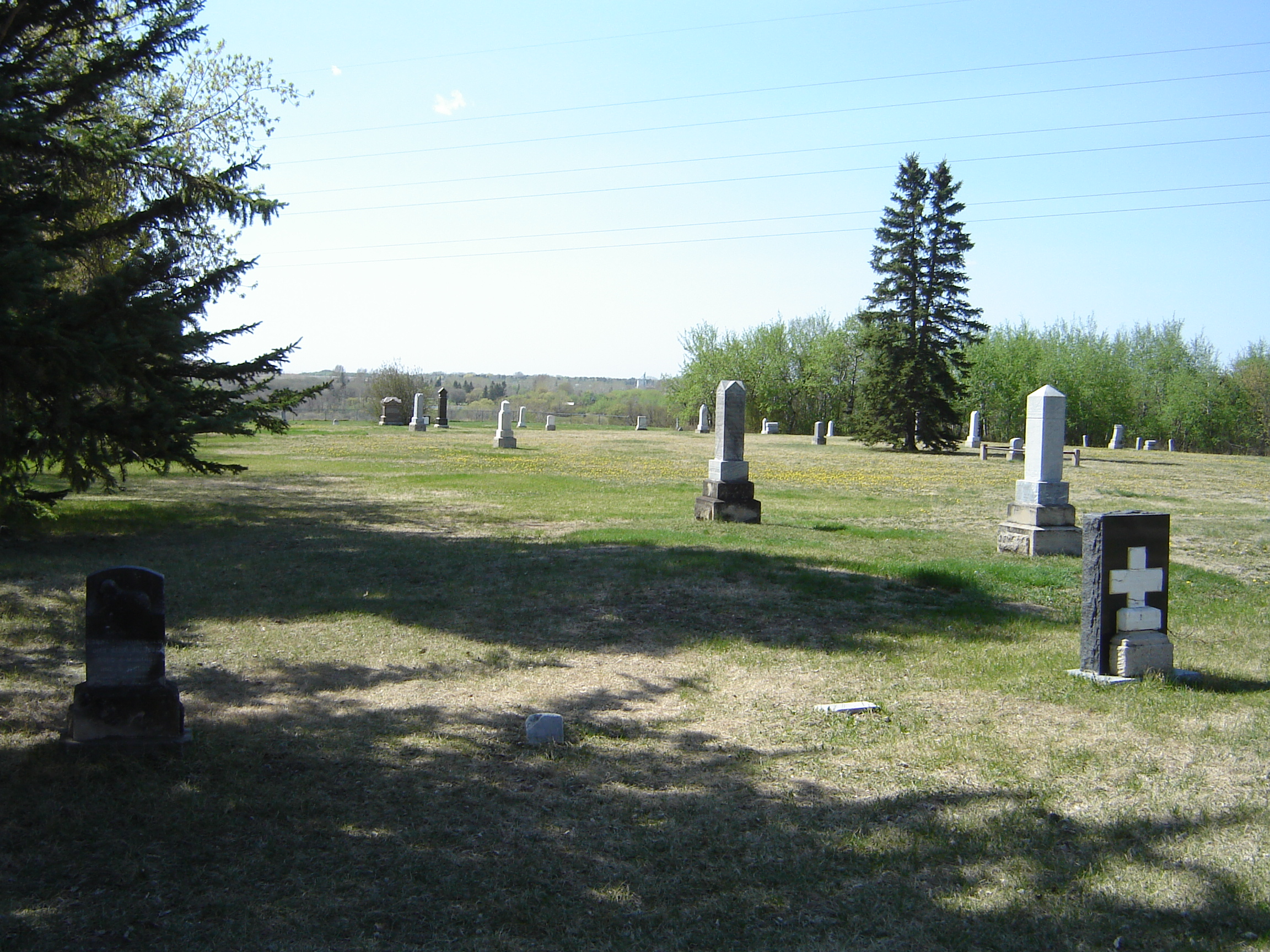
- Interactive map of Nutana Pioneer Cemetery

Details
- Established: 1884
- Location: St. Henry Avenue; Saskatoon, Saskatchewan, Canada
- Country: Canada
- Owned by: City of Saskatoon
- No. of graves: 162
- Website: Saskatoon Heritage Society
- Find a Grave: Nutana Pioneer Cemetery

Nutana Pioneer Cemetery is a cemetery located in the Diefenbaker Management Area of Saskatoon, Saskatchewan, Canada. The Cemetery is along the bank of the South Saskatchewan River and is a designated Provincial heritage site by the Saskatoon Heritage Society.

Established in 1884, many of the earliest settlers in Saskatoon are buried at the cemetery. The Nutana Cemetery Company owned the cemetery from 1905 until 1910 when it became the property of the City of Saskatoon. Following the transfer to the city and due to the unstable riverbank, burials were restricted to plot owners and family, with the last burial occurring in 1948.
