= Aspen Ridge, Saskatoon =

Aspen Ridge
- Neighbourhood
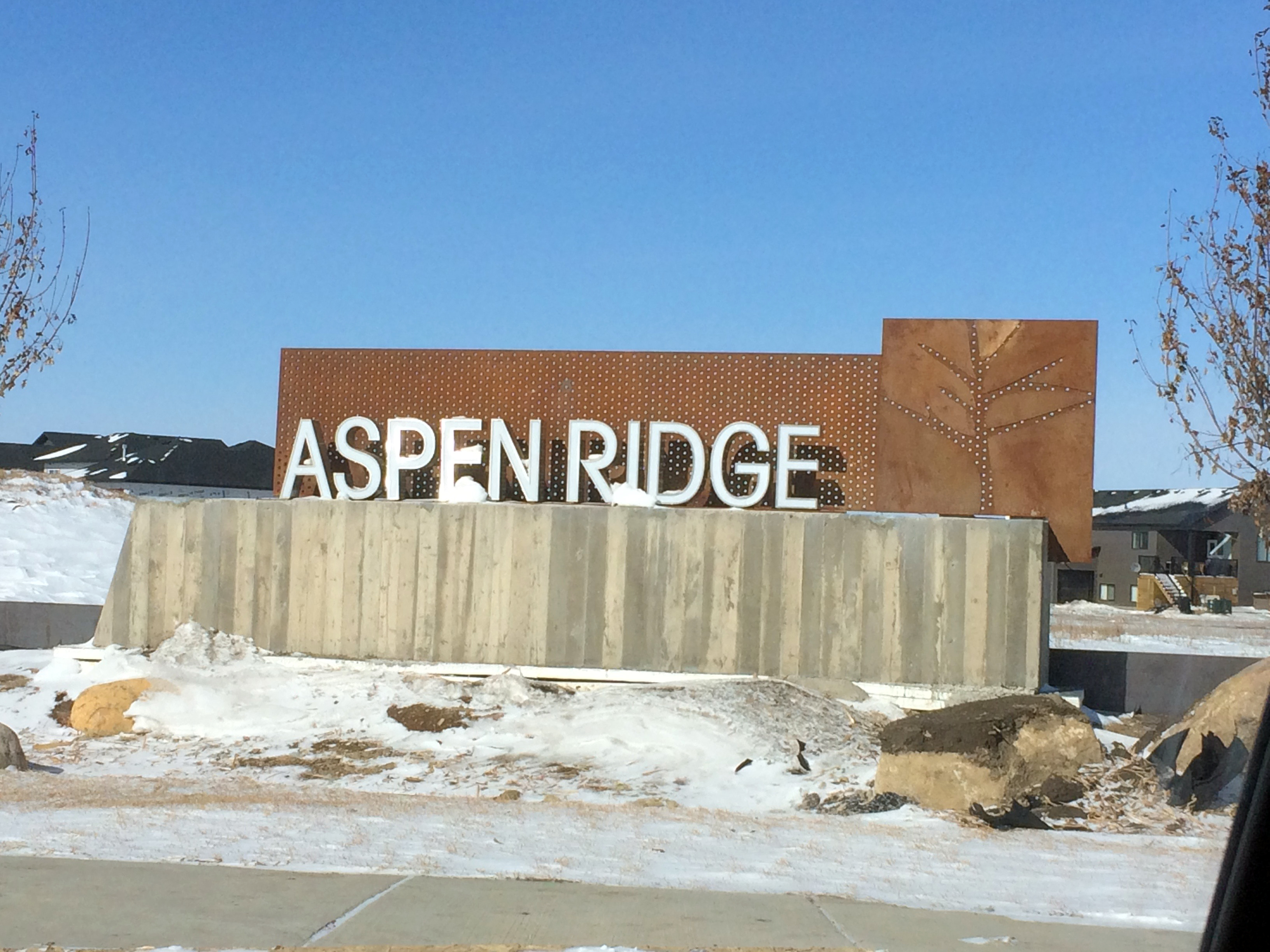
- Aspen Ridge entrance sign
- Interactive map of Aspen Ridge
- Coordinates: 52°10′46″N 106°32′37″W
- Country: Canada
- Province: Saskatchewan
- City: Saskatoon
- Suburban Development Area: University Heights
- Neighbourhood: Aspen Ridge
- Annexed: 2010
- Construction: 2014 - present

Government
  - Type: Municipal (Ward 10)
  - Administrative body: Saskatoon City Council
  - Councillor: Zach Jeffries

Area
  - Total: 2.57 km^{2} (0.99 sq mi)

Population
  - Total: 13,000 (est. upon buildout)
  - Average Income: $
- Time zone: UTC-6 (UTC)

Aspen Ridge is a neighbourhood located in northeast Saskatoon, Saskatchewan, Canada, construction on which began in 2014. At full build-out, Aspen Ridge will eventually house an estimated 13,000 people. Unlike many of the city's suburban neighbourhoods, it will feature higher density housing on a grid network of roads.

== History ==
The land where Aspen Ridge is located was annexed on August 1, 2010. The first concept drawings of Aspen Ridge (then unnamed) appeared in the University Heights Sector Plan in 2007.

== Government and politics ==
Aspen Ridge exists within the federal electoral district of Saskatoon—University. It is currently represented by Corey Tochor of the Conservative Party of Canada, first elected in 2019.

Provincially, the area is within the constituency of Saskatoon Willowgrove. It is currently represented by Ken Cheveldayoff of the Saskatchewan Party, first elected in 2003.

In Saskatoon's non-partisan municipal politics, Aspen Ridge lies within ward 10. It is currently represented by Councillor Zach Jeffries, first elected in 2012.

== Institutions ==
=== Education ===
No plans exist yet for schools in Aspen Ridge. St. Joseph High School and Centennial Collegiate are located in the University Heights Suburban Centre immediately to the south. The nearest elementary schools as of 2019 are located in nearby Evergreen and Willowgrove, though the city's public and separate school boards have yet to indicate where students residing in Aspen Ridge will be bused until such a time as schools are constructed in the community.

== Parks and recreation ==
No plans exist yet for recreation facilities within the community, although the community plan shows the usual allotment of neighbourhood parks. A regional recreation facility, the SaskTel Soccer Centre, is located in the University Heights Suburban Centre to the south. The Forestry Farm Park and Saskatoon Zoo is also in the vicinity. A 24-metre wide Greenway has also been planned abutting the northwest border of Aspen Ridge, designed as a park, stormwater drainage channel, alternative transportation corridor and protective buffer to adjacent Northeast Swale natural area.

== Commercial ==
The neighbourhood concept plan identifies two commercial zones: a mixed-use commercial/residential area on the edge of the community in the southwest corner, and a purely commercial district in the southeast corner. Until such commercial development occurs, the nearest major retail area is several kilometres to the southwest in the University Heights Suburban Centre.

== Location ==
Aspen Ridge is a roughly triangular shaped neighbourhood located within the University Heights Suburban Development Area. It is bounded to the south by the neighbourhood of Evergreen and the University of Saskatchewan Kearnan Farm, with the latter forming a green belt separation between Aspen Ridge and other communities to the south. To the north and east it is bounded by the proposed provincial perimeter highway, and to the north and west it is bounded by the Northeast Swale preserved lands. Its primary road access is via McOrmond Drive from the south and northwest which links to Chief Mistawasis Bridge, connecting to the northwest end of Saskatoon with Agra Road, a grid road, providing access to the perimeter highway to the east, though this road will be removed by further development.
