= University Heights Sector =

- Sector
- Interactive map of University Heights Sector
- Coordinates: 52°9′14″N 106°34′41″W
- Country: Canada
- Province: Saskatchewan
- City: Saskatoon

Area
  - Water: 0 km^{2} (0 sq mi) 0%

Population (2021)
  - Total: 55,689
- 62,152 projected 2025
- Area code: Area code 306

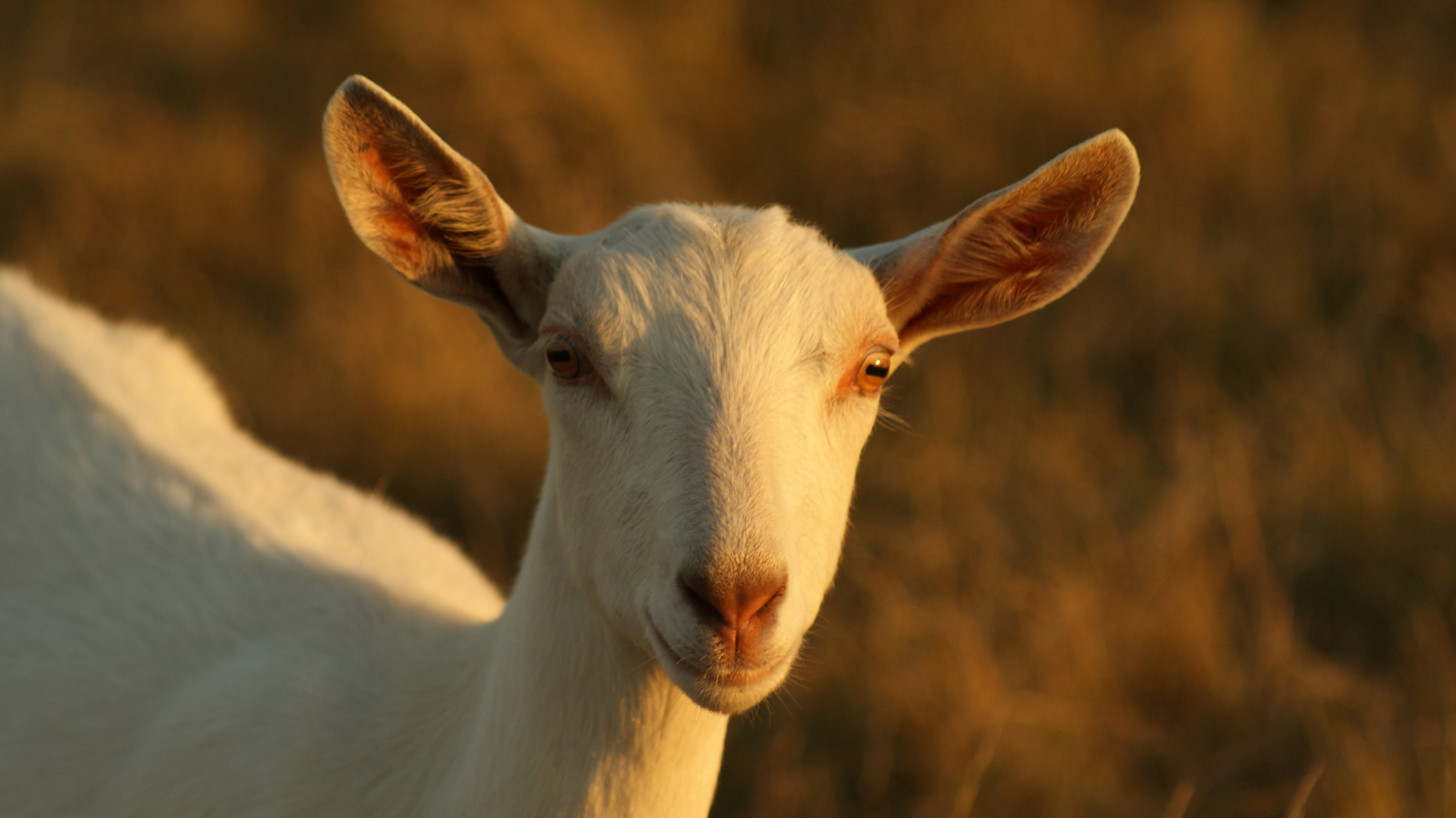
Goats on a University farm in the SDA

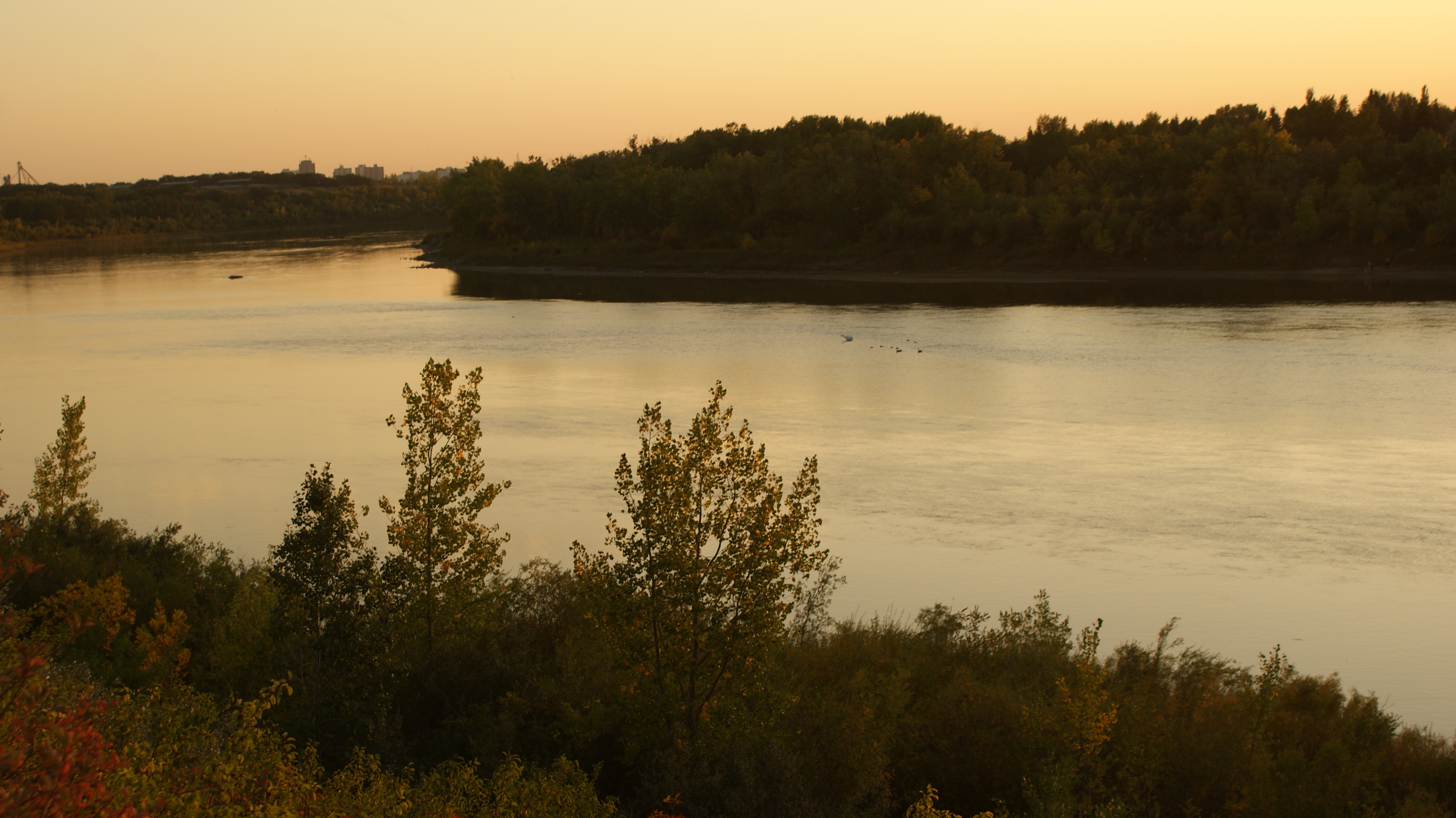
Sunset from Petturson's Ravine conservation area facing the U of S

University Heights Sector, previously known as University Heights Suburban Development Area (SDA), is a sector in Saskatoon, Saskatchewan, Canada. It is a part of the east side community of Saskatoon. It lies (generally) south of the outskirts of the City and the Rural Municipality of Corman Park No. 344, east of the University Sector, as well as the South Saskatchewan River and Lawson Sector, and north of the Lakewood Sector.

== Future Centre ==
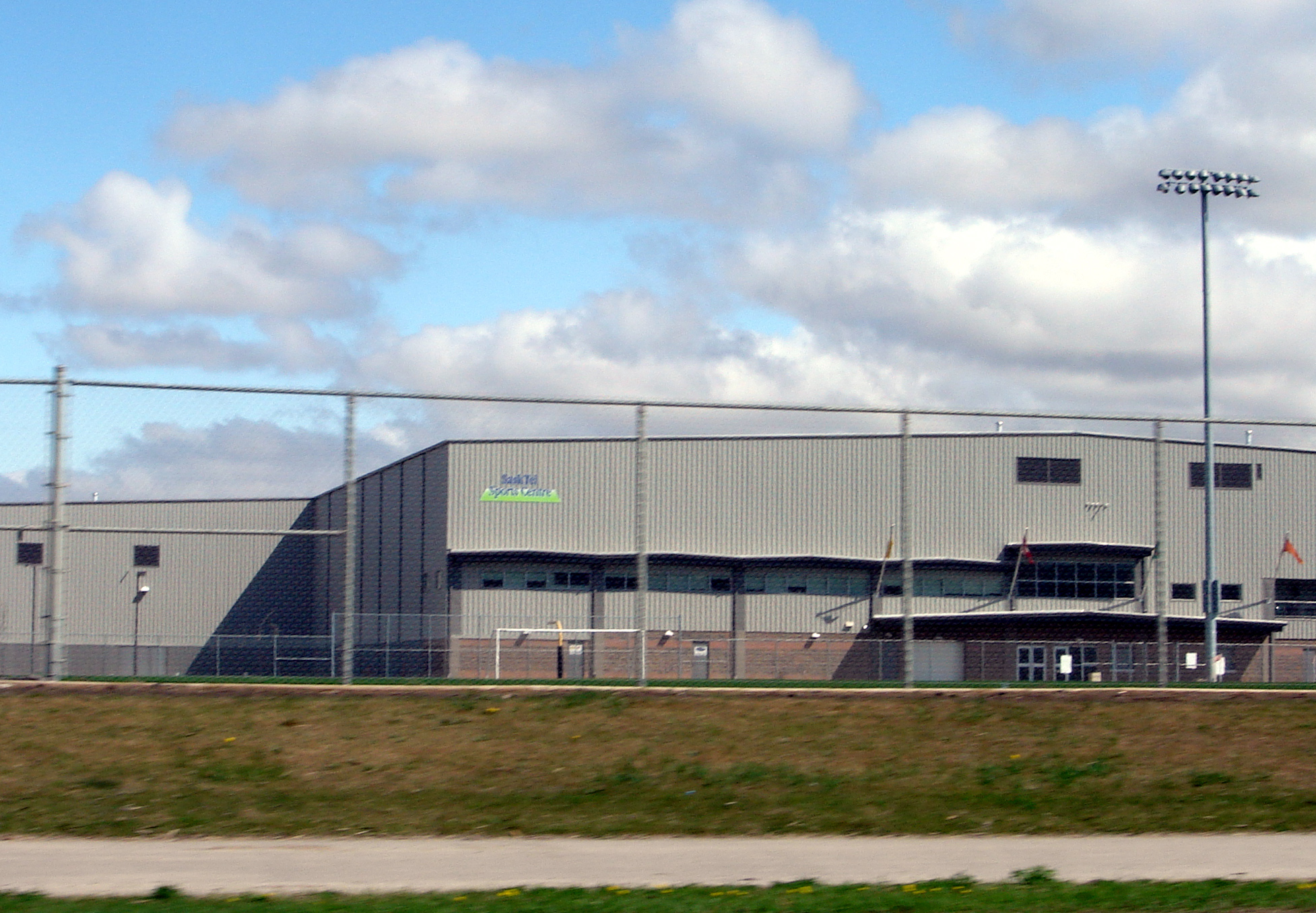
Sask Tel Sports Centre

This area at the beginning of the 21st century is one of the fastest growing neighbourhoods of Saskatoon. A multidimensional park is being planned, incorporating outdoor and indoor soccer fields, St. Joseph's High School, an artificial turf football field, the Alice Turner branch of the Saskatoon Public Library, a fire hall, and a recycling depot.

== Neighbourhoods ==
- Arbor Creek
- Aspen Ridge
- Erindale
- Evergreen
- Forest Grove
- Silverspring
- Sutherland
- Sutherland Industrial
- University Heights Urban Centre
- Willowgrove

There are seven areas for expansion in the University Heights Sector

- University Heights Urban Centre
- Willowgrove (2004)
- Evergreen (2011)
- Aspen Ridge (2015)
- Neighbourhoods 3-5 projected 2017-2025

The city commenced selling lots in Evergreen in 2011. Construction on the first phase of Aspen Ridge began in 2015.

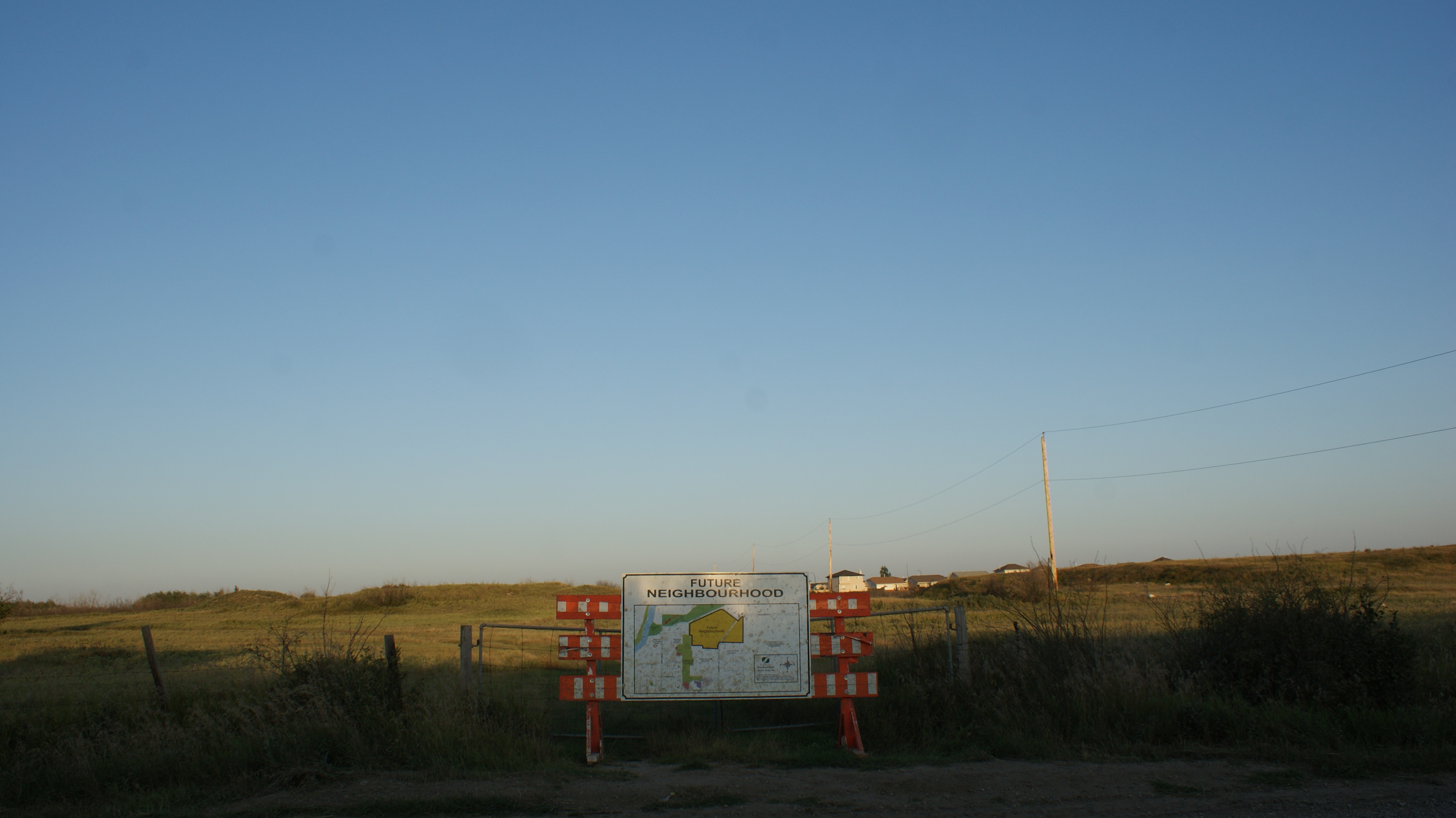
Future Neighbourhood area map, pre-development

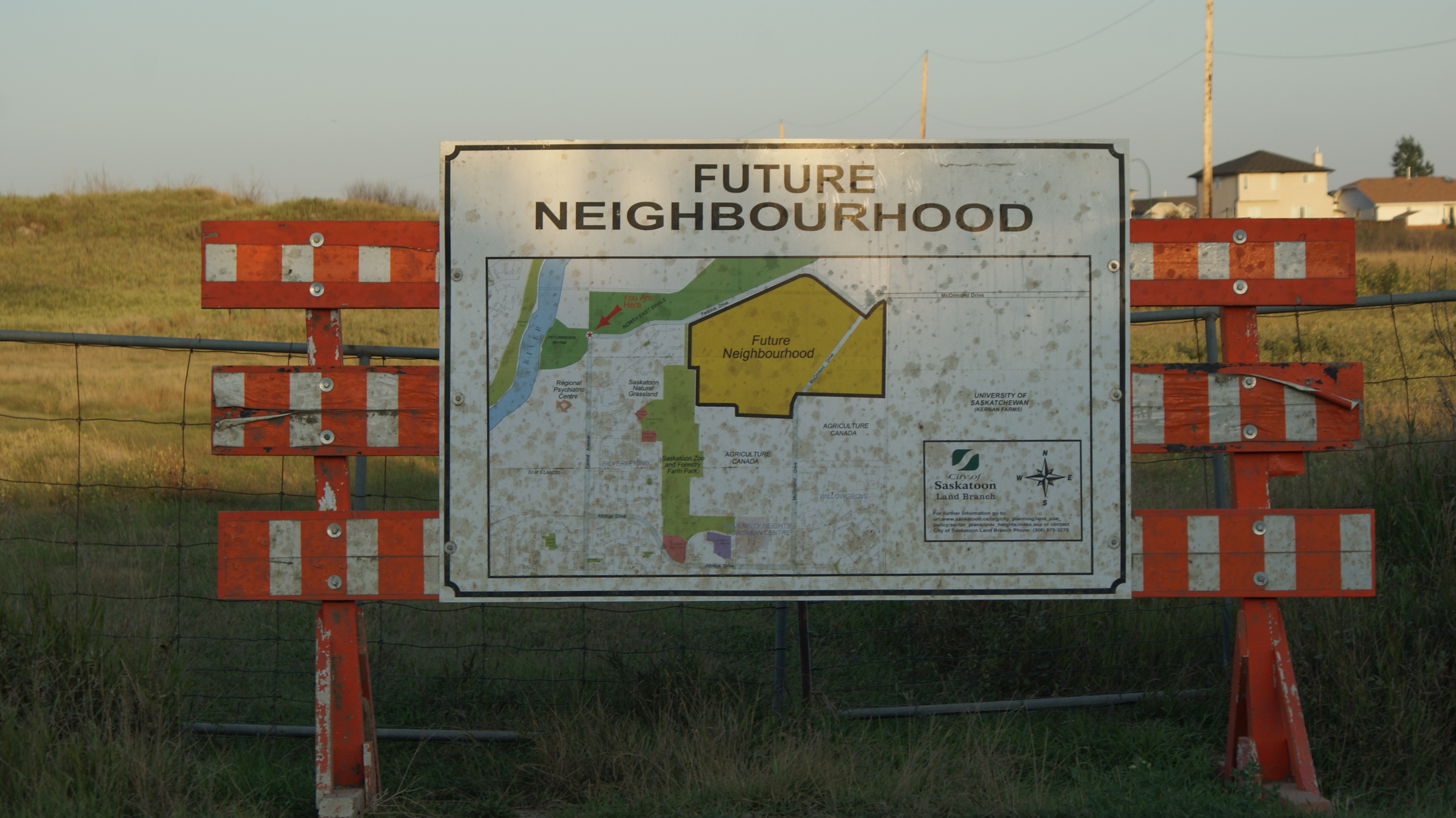
Sign indicating location of future Evergreen community.

== Recreation facilities ==
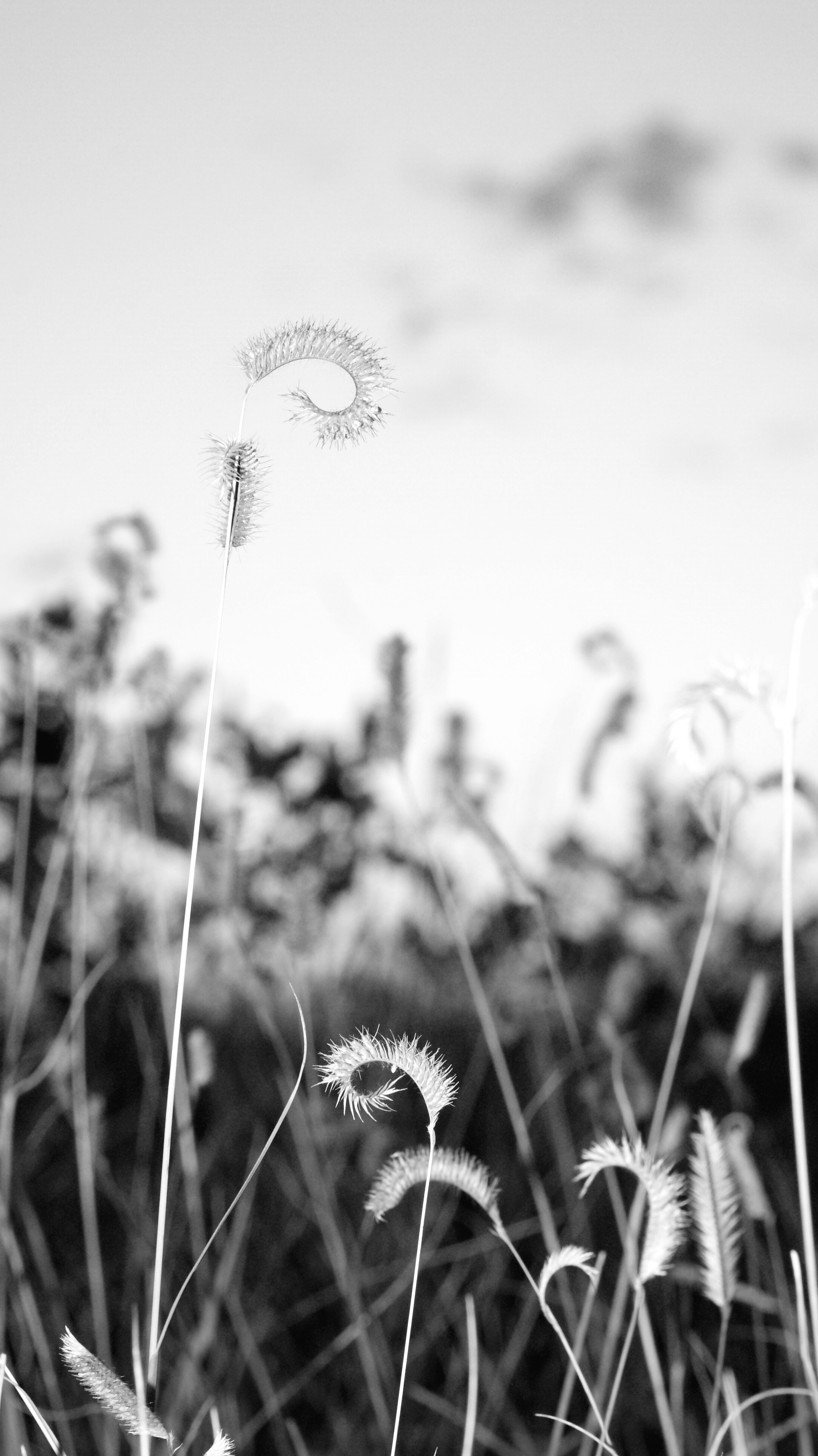
Grass in the Petturson's Ravine conservation area

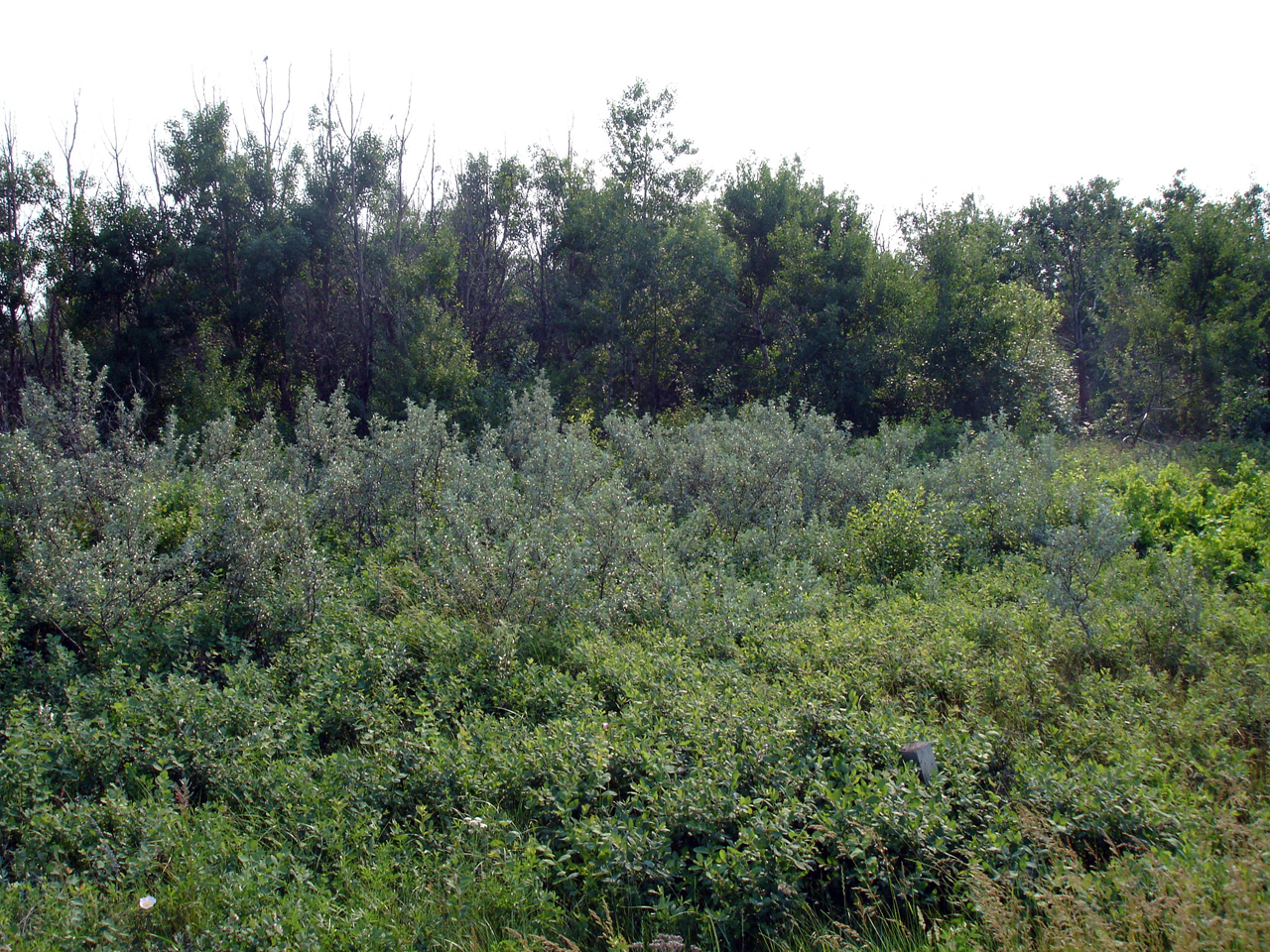
Saskatoon Natural Grassland conservation area

- Saskatoon Forestry Farm Park and Zoo
- Saskatoon Natural Grassland conservation area located east of the Forestry Farm Park and Zoo
- Petturson's Ravine located north of the Regional Psychiatric Centre, east of the South Saskatchewan River and west of the proposed new neighbourhood developments and across the road from the Saskatoon Natural Grassland conservation area.
- The Peggy McKercher Conservation Area, was dedicated on Tuesday, September 15, 2009, 2:00 pm This new 22.8-acre (92,000 m^{2}) park is located north on Central Avenue past the Saskatoon Regional Psychiatric Centre and past Petturson's Ravine situated on the river bank.
- Outdoor skate park located east of the Recycling Facility

== Education ==
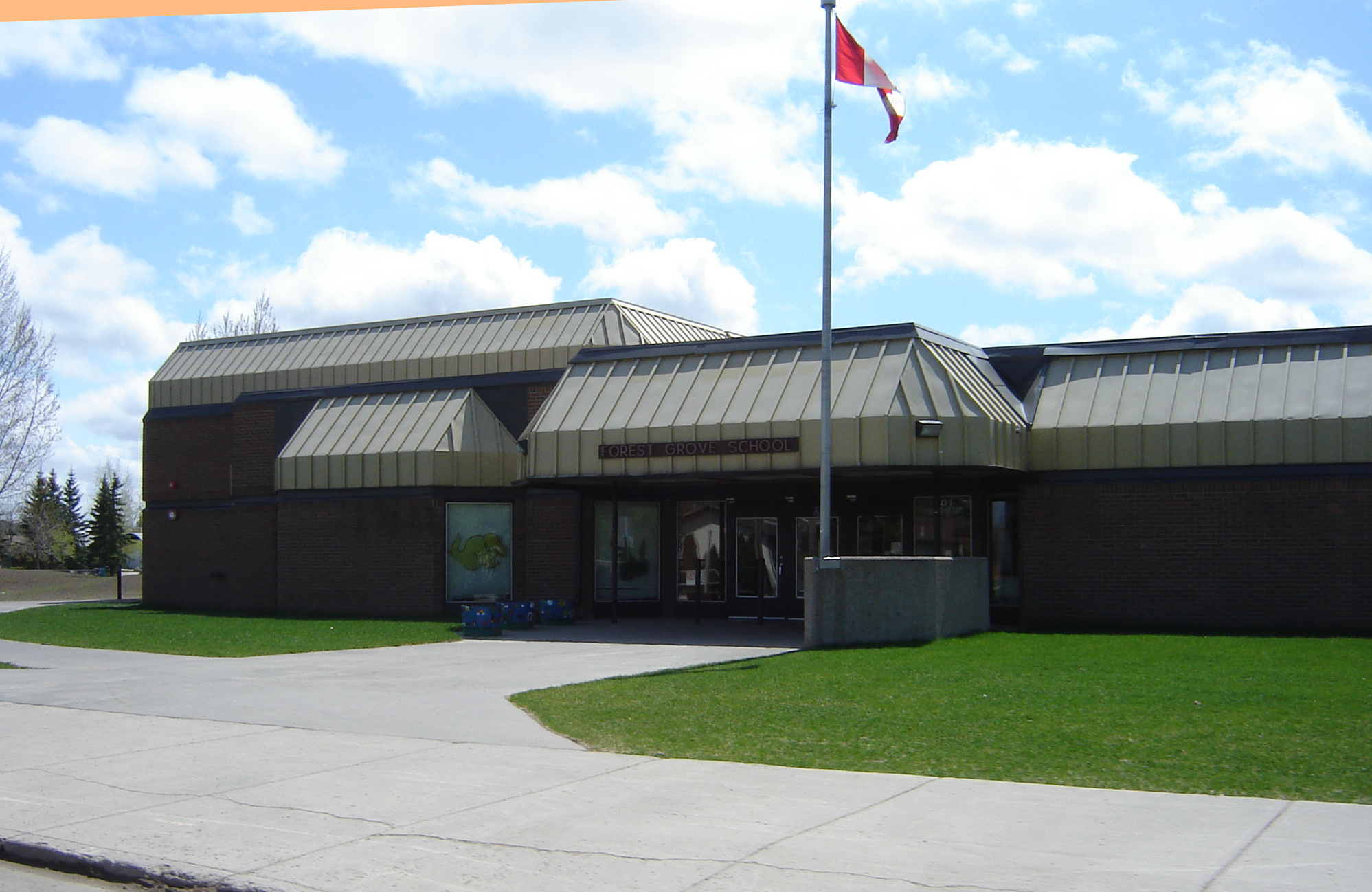
Forest Grove School

University Heights Sector is home to the following schools:

=== Post-secondary education ===
- University of Saskatchewan

=== Separate education ===
==== Secondary schools ====
- St. Joseph High School

==== Elementary schools ====
- St. Volodymyr School
- Father Robinson School
- Mother Teresa School
- Bishop Filevich Ukrainian Bilingual School
- Holy Family School
- St. Nicholas School

=== Public education ===
==== Secondary schools ====
- Centennial Collegiate

==== Elementary schools ====
- École Forest Grove School
- Dr. John G. Egnatoff School
- Silverspring School
- Sutherland School
- Willowgrove School
- Sylvia Fedoruk School

== Library ==
- Saskatoon Public Library Alice Turner Branch Library

== Transportation ==
The neighbourhoods are served by Central Avenue, McOrmond Drive, Fedoruk Drive, Attridge Drive which are main streets of the city. There will be a perimeter highway around the northern sector. Saskatchewan Highway 5 enters this north eastern sector of Saskatoon. SK Hwy 5 runs connects Humboldt, and Kamsack to the Manitoba border.

In May 2013 the City confirmed plans to build a north commuter bridge connecting with a northwestern extension of McOrmond Drive within the sector . Completed in the late 2010s, the new bridge/McOrmond extension connects directly with Marquis Drive on the west side and provide an alternate city bypass route to Circle Drive, while also establishing the groundwork for future road connections to yet-to-be-developed neighbourhoods on the north side of the sector .

=== City transit ===
The following routes serve the area; some of these only serve the University of Saskatchewan and are so listed. There are bus terminals on the University campus and on 115th Street.

- 1 Wildwood – Westview (U of S only)
- 3 College Park – Riversdale
- 5 Briarwood – Fairhaven (U of S only)
- 6 Clarence – Broadway (U of S only)
- 13 Lawson – Exhibition (U of S only)
- 21 Forest Grove – City Centre
- 43 Evergreen – City Centre
- 44 Willowgrove – City Centre
- 45 Arbor Creek – City Centre
- 50 Lakeview – Pacific Heights (U of S only)
- 60 Lakeridge – Confederation (U of S only)
- 70 Silverspring – Lawson Heights
- 80 Erindale/Arbor Creek – Silverwood Heights
