= Silverspring, Saskatoon =

Silverspring
- Neighborhood
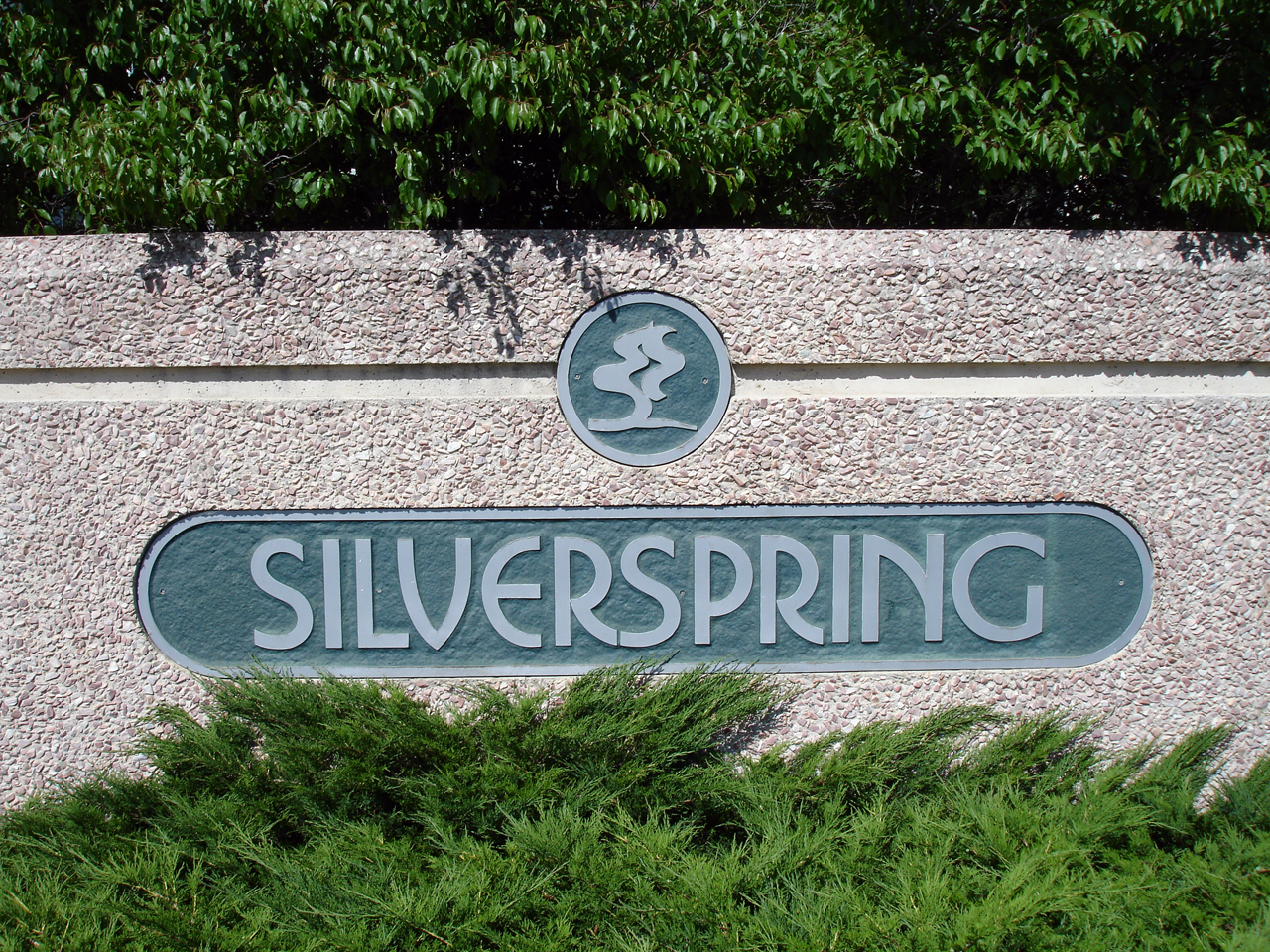
- Silverspring entrance sign

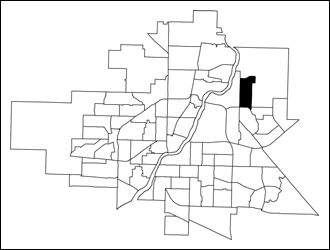
- Silverspring location map
- Coordinates: 52°9′31″N 106°35′25″W
- Country: Canada
- Province: Saskatchewan
- City: Saskatoon
- Suburban Development Area: University Heights
- Neighbourhood: Silverspring
- Annexed: 1955-1959
- Construction: 1986-2001

Government
  - Type: Municipal (Ward 10)
  - Administrative body: Saskatoon City Council
  - Councillor: Zach Jeffries
  - MLA: Paul Merriman
  - MP: Corey Tochor

Area
  - Total: 1.78 km^{2} (0.69 sq mi)

Population (2006)
  - Total: 4,936
  - Average Income: $85,084
- Time zone: UTC-6 (UTC)
- Website: www.silverspringcommunity.ca

Silverspring is a residential neighbourhood located in northeast Saskatoon, Saskatchewan, Canada. It is a suburban subdivision, composed mostly of low-density, single detached houses. As of 2007, the area is home to 4,936 residents. The neighbourhood is considered a high income area, with an average family income of $85,084, an average dwelling value of $322,670 and a home ownership rate of 97.8%. According to MLS data, the average sale price of a home as of 2013 was $407,171.

== History ==
The majority of Silverspring was constructed during the early 1990s Till 2000, on land formerly administered by the University of Saskatchewan. The land for the Silverspring community was annexed between 1955, and 1959;. Development started in 1986 however due to the recession and housing downturn, the majority of residential building construction was done after 1991, and a small amount of construction was just one decade before this.

Notable Saskatoon athletes and contributors to the sports world had roadways of Silverspring named in their honour. They include Diane Jones Konihowski, Hal Laycoe, Catriona Le May Doan and Vera Pezer.

== Government and politics ==
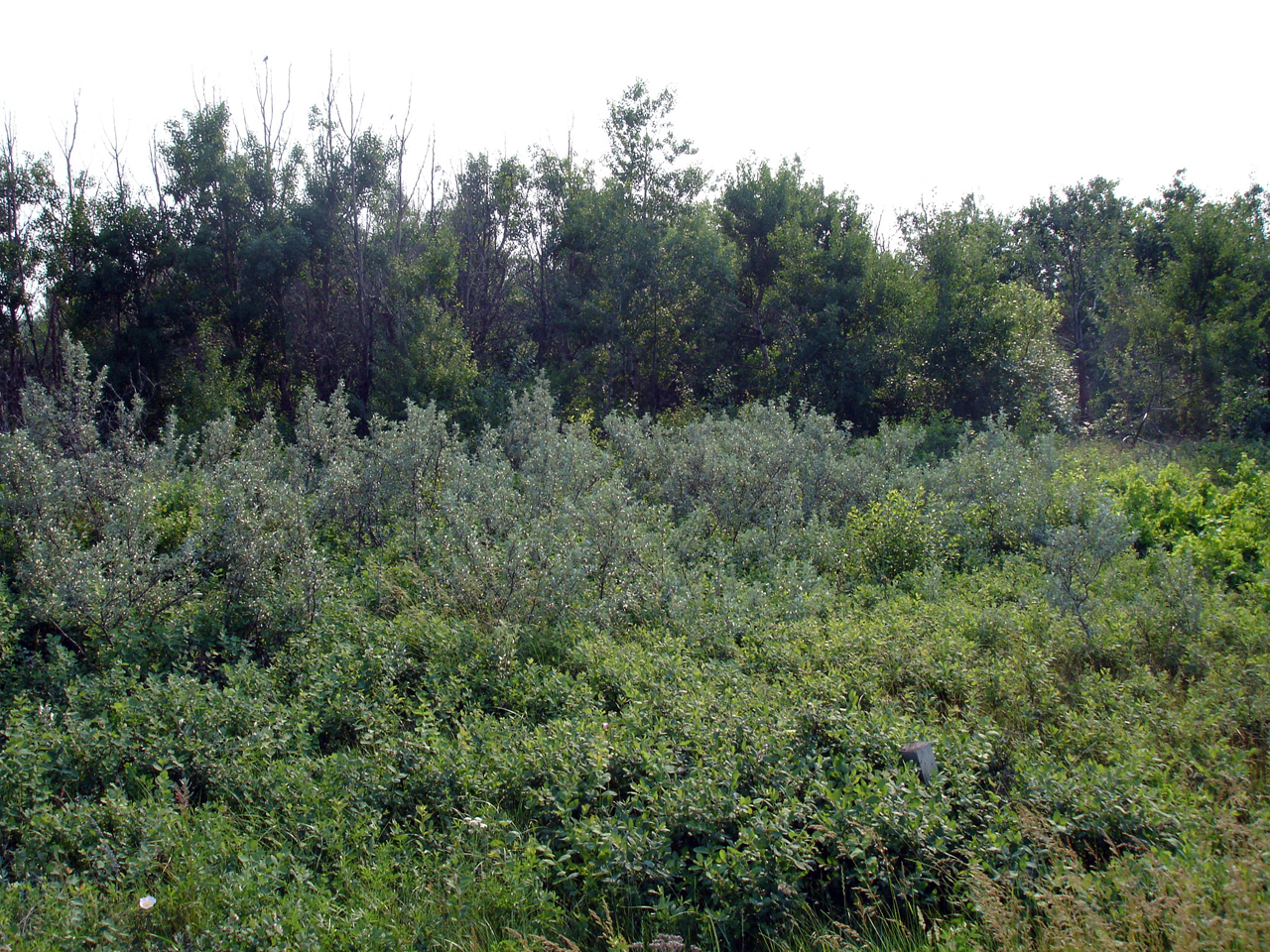
Saskatoon Natural Grasslands

Silverspring exists within the federal electoral district of Saskatoon—University. It is currently represented by Corey Tochor of the Conservative Party of Canada, first elected in 2019.

Provincially, the area is within the constituency of Saskatoon Silverspring-Sutherland. It is currently represented by Hugh Gordon of the Saskatchewan NDP, first elected in 2024, defeating incumbent Saskatchewan Party MLA Paul Merriman.

In Saskatoon's non-partisan municipal politics, Silverspring lies within ward 10. It is currently represented by Zach Jeffries, first elected in 2012.

== Institutions ==
=== Education ===
École St. Mother Teresa School
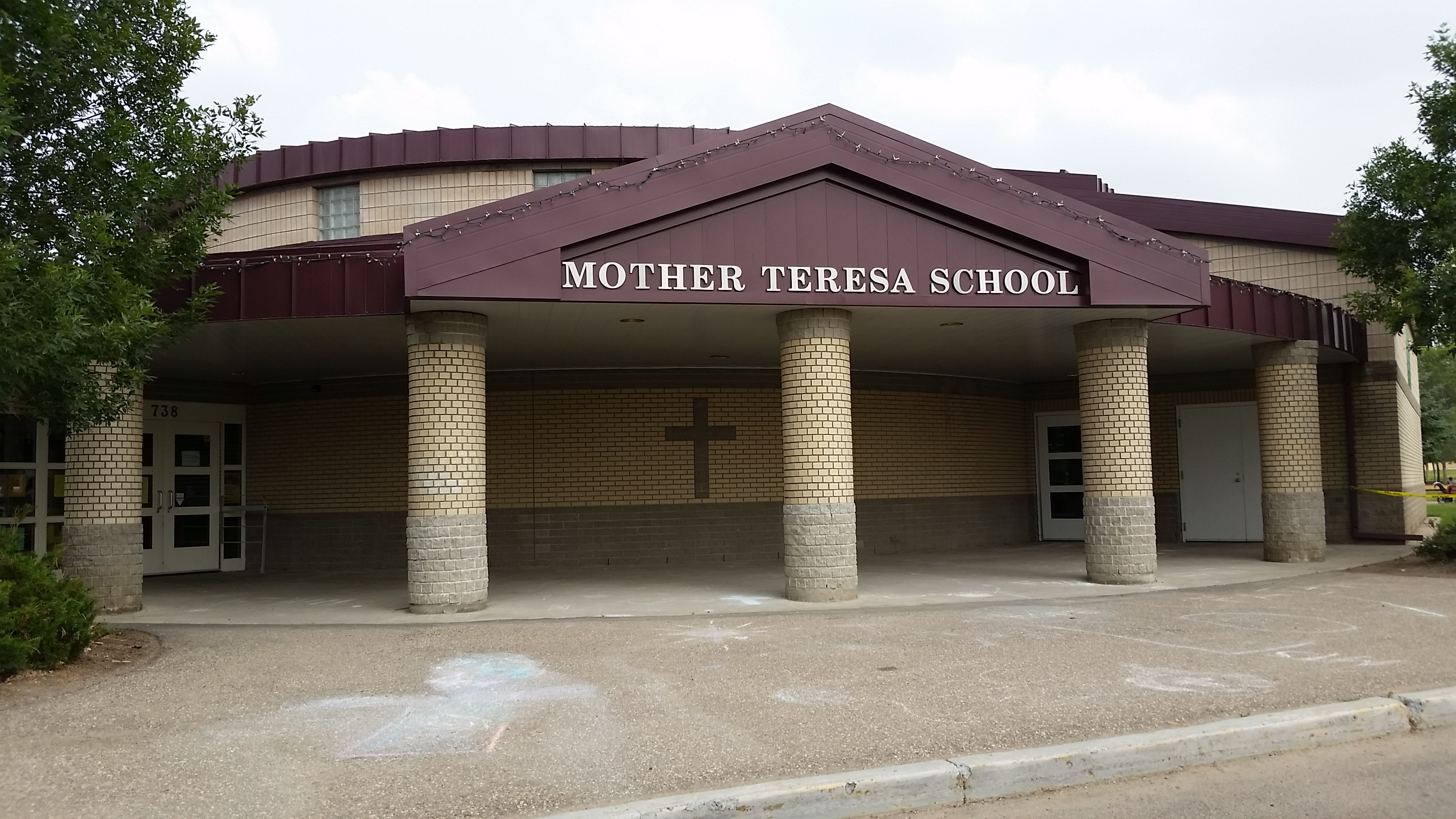
- 738 Konihowski Road; Saskatoon, Saskatchewan, S7S 1M4; Canada

Information
- Type: Elementary
- Religious affiliation: Catholic
- Opened: 2001
- School board: Greater Saskatoon Catholic Schools
- Principal: Jill Clapson
- Grades: Kindergarten to Grade 8
- Enrollment: 587 (2017)
- Education system: Separate
- Language: English, French Immersion
- Feeder to: St. Joseph High School
- Website: Mother Teresa School

École Silverspring School
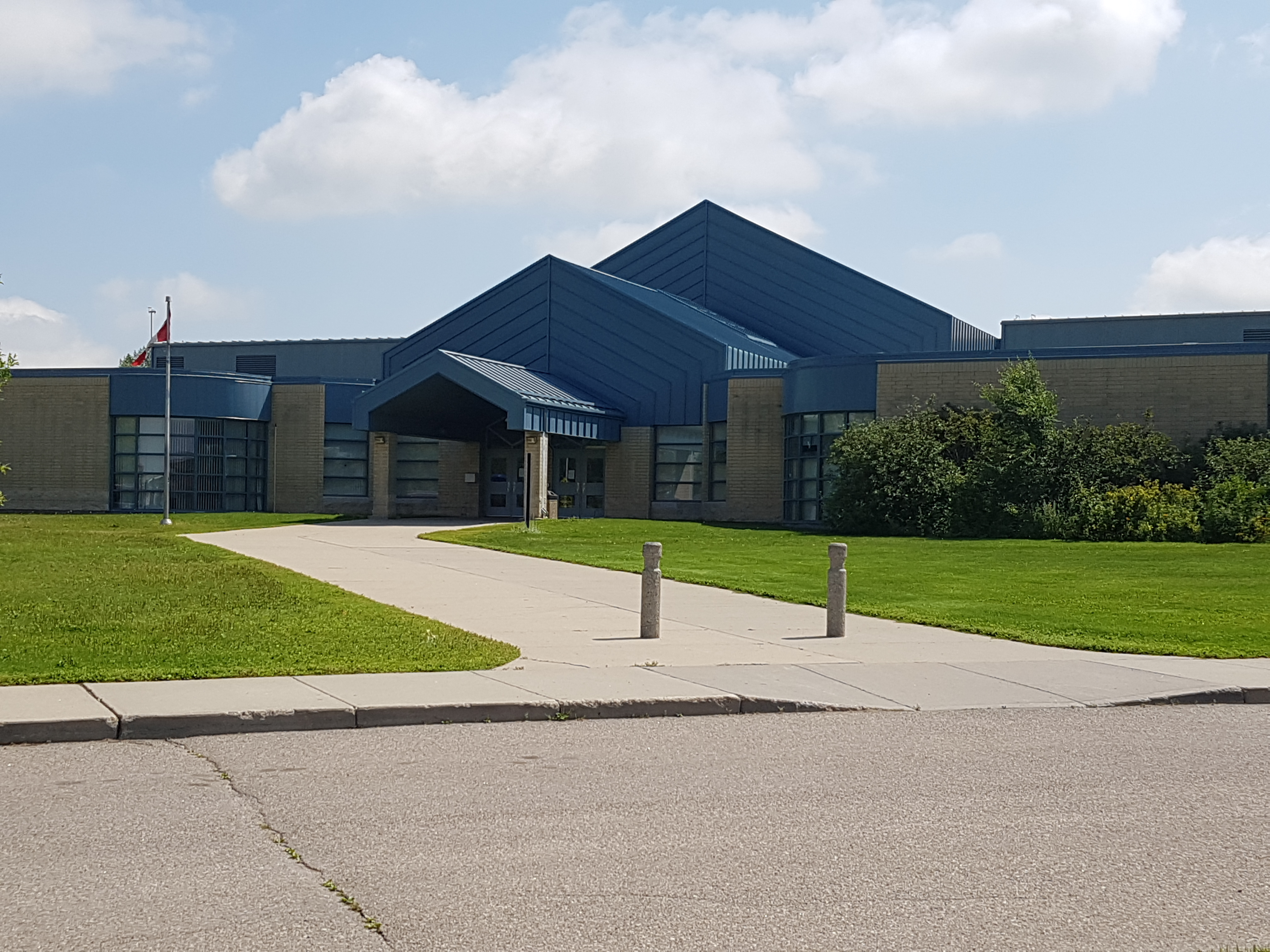
- 610 Konihowski Road; Saskatoon, Saskatchewan, S7S 1M5; Canada

Information
- Type: Elementary
- School board: Saskatoon Public School Division
- Principal: Jennifer Haywood
- Grades: Kindergarten to Grade 8
- Enrollment: 444 (2017)
- Education system: Public
- Language: English, French Immersion
- Feeder to: Centennial Collegiate
- Website: Silverspring School

- École St. Mother Teresa School - separate (Catholic) elementary, part of Greater Saskatoon Catholic Schools
- École Silverspring School - public elementary, part of the Saskatoon Public School Division
- Adjacent to University of Saskatchewan lands, with some U of S lecture and research facilities located across Central Avenue from Silverspring. The main campus is several kilometres away.
- The Regional Psychiatric Centre is located on Central Avenue, between Garvie Road and Somers Road

== Parks and recreation ==
- Christine Morris Park - 0.6 acres (0.24 ha)
- Dave King Park - 0.6 acres (0.24 ha)
- Silverspring Park - 19 acres (7.7 ha)

The Saskatoon Natural Grasslands is 34 acres (14 ha) of preserved, uncultivated prairie grassland. Many types of plants, such as grasses, lichens, wildflowers and fungi can be found in this ecosystem. The Saskatoon Nature Society acts as the steward for this natural area. Sutherland Beach, a popular park and off-leash area along the east shore of the South Saskatchewan River, is accessible via a roadway off Central Avenue immediately adjacent to Silverspring.

Silverspring is also immediately adjacent to the Forestry Farm Park and Zoo.

The Silverspring Community Association is involved in operating the community rink, organizing sports teams, and hosting a variety of events and activities.

== Commercial ==
At present, no parts of Silverspring have commercial development though a couple of lots on Central Avenue have been set aside for neighbourhood commercial. 103 home-based businesses exist in the area. The closest major commercial is the nearby University Heights commercial area accessed via Attridge Drive to the east, and the Preston Crossing big box development to the west.

== Location ==
Silverspring is located within the University Heights Suburban Development Area. It is bounded by Agra Road to the north, Attridge Drive to the south, Central Avenue to the west, and the Saskatoon Forestry Farm Park and Zoo to the east. City maps show Agra Road replaced by a new arterial named Fedoruk Road as the northern boundary.
