= Evergreen, Saskatoon =

Evergreen
- Neighbourhood
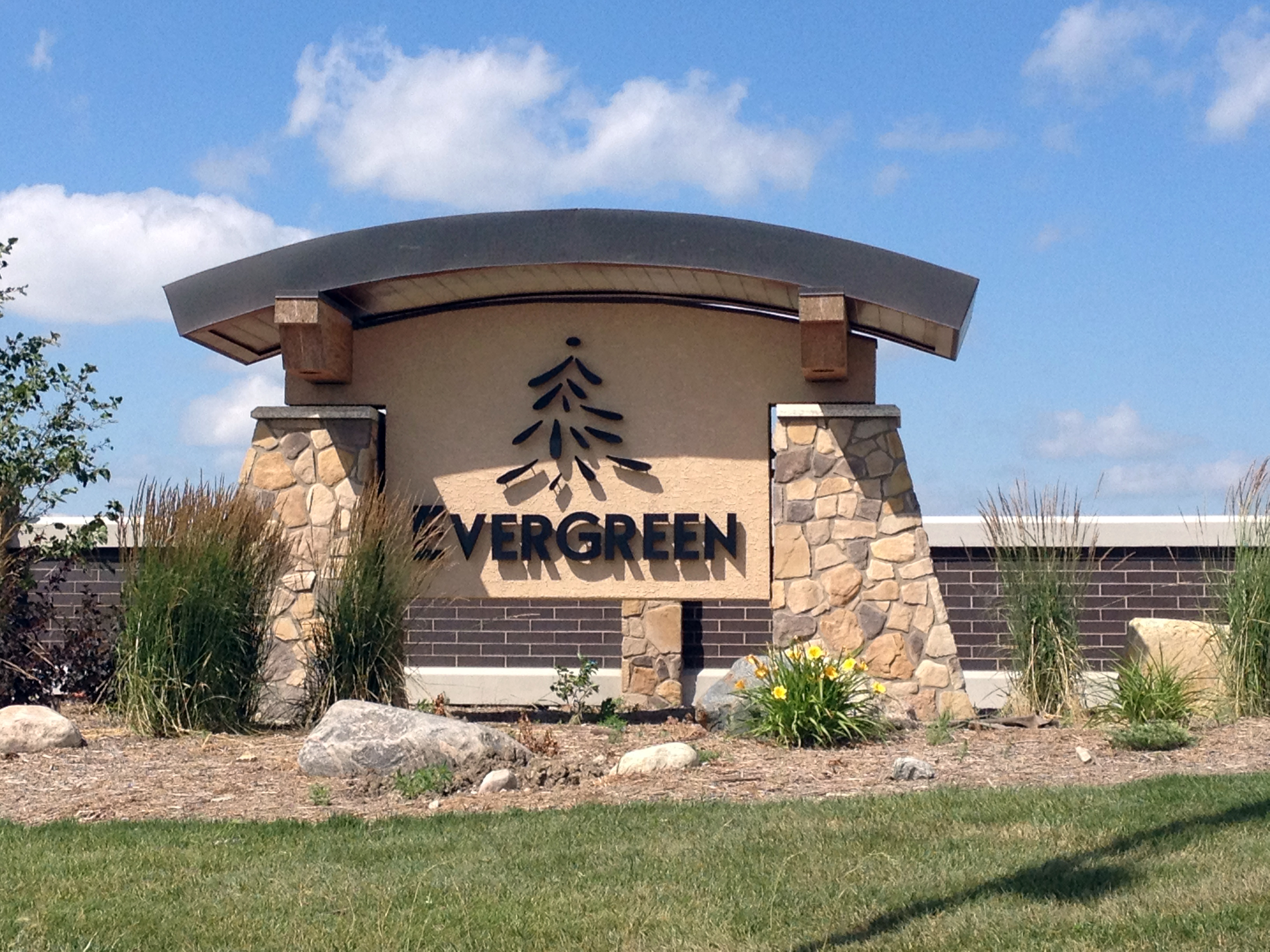
- Evergreen entrance sign
- Country: Canada
- Province: Saskatchewan
- City: Saskatoon
- Suburban Development Area: University Heights
- Neighbourhood: Evergreen
- Annexed: 2005
- Construction: 2010-2020

Government
  - Type: Municipal (Ward 10)
  - Administrative body: Saskatoon City Council
  - Councillor: Zach Jeffries
  - MLA: Ken Cheveldayoff
  - MP: Corey Tochor

Population
  - Total: 7,794
- Time zone: UTC-6 (UTC)

Evergreen is a residential neighbourhood under construction within the University Heights Suburban Development Area of Saskatoon, Saskatchewan. The residential area is constructed around the village centre and a larger district village. The subdivision was created in 2010. Evergreen is projected to have a density of 8.6 units per acre, becoming one of the densest neighbourhoods in Saskatoon when complete.

== Description ==
The Evergreen neighbourhood is planned to be built out in seven phases. Once complete, the following statistics are expected:

- 655 acres (including 42.12 acres of park land);
- 12,622 projected population;
- 5,712 units (2,021 single family units and 3,691 units).

The neighbourhood is named for two 50-year-old Scots Pines that were incorporated into the layout of the neighbourhood. These trees were originally part of the Sutherland Forest Nursery Station. The former Bridge City Speedway location was redeveloped as part of the neighbourhood.

The community is separated from neighbouring developments to the south by greenbelts provided by University of Saskatchewan agricultural land holdings and the Forestry Farm Park and Zoo.

As is standard in most recently developed Saskatoon communities, street names consist of assorted names recognizing Saskatoon citizens, with main core roads using the name of the community.

The first residential lots were offered for sale by the City of Saskatoon in 2010.

Evergreen will be the first large scale installation of LED street lights by Saskatoon Light & Power.

== Government and politics ==
Evergreen exists within the federal electoral district of Saskatoon—University. It is currently represented by Corey Tochor of the Conservative Party of Canada, first elected in 2019.

Provincially, the area is divided into the constituencies of Saskatoon Silverspring-Sutherland and Saskatoon Willowgrove. Saskatoon Silverspring-Sutherland is currently represented by Paul Merriman of the Saskatchewan Party since 2011. Saskatoon Willowgrove is currently represented by Ken Cheveldayoff of the Saskatchewan Party since 2003.

In Saskatoon's non-partisan municipal politics, Evergreen lies within ward 10. It is currently represented by Zach Jeffries, first elected in 2012.

== Institutions ==
=== Education ===
St. Nicholas Catholic School
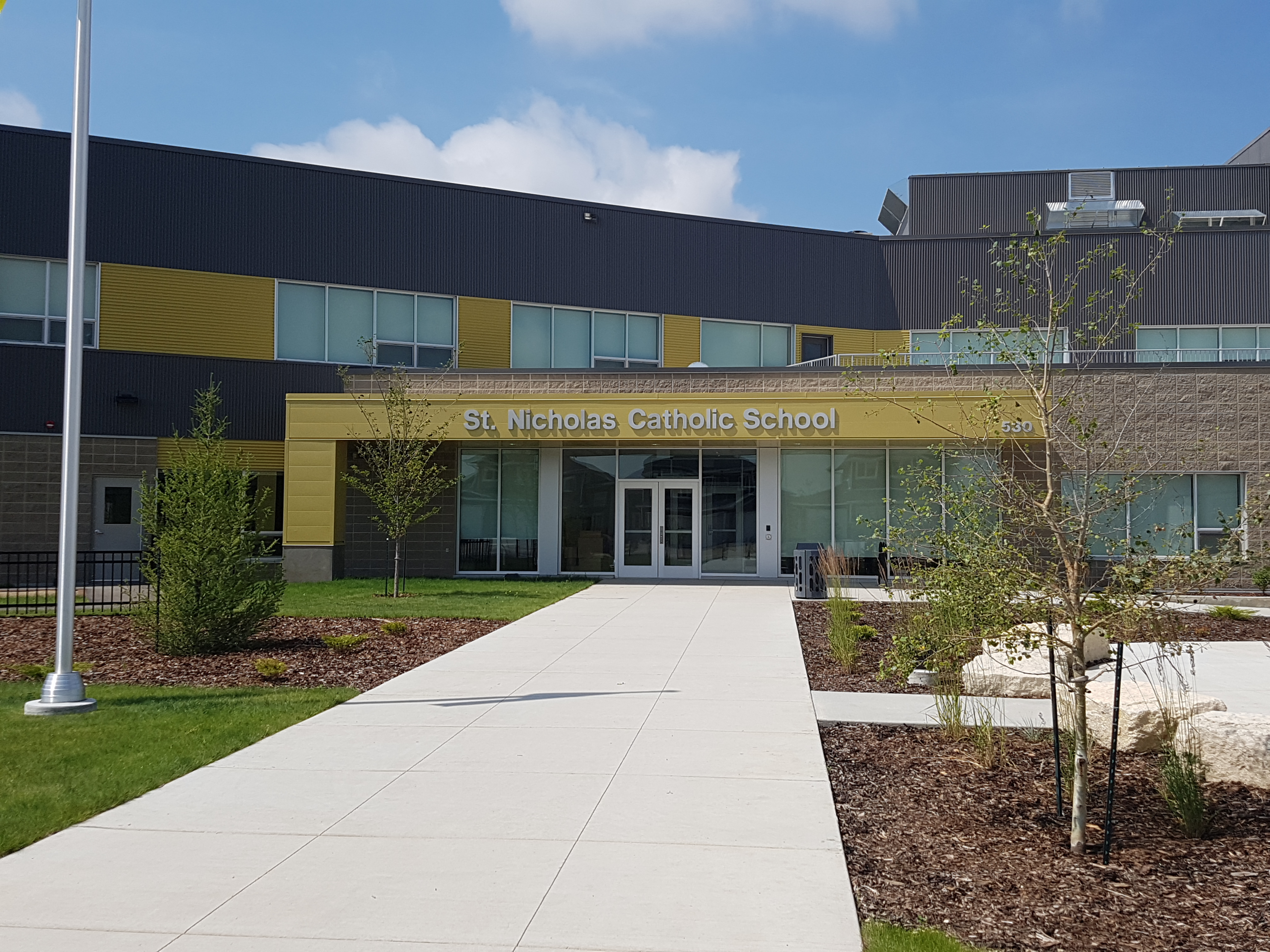
- 530 Manek Road; Saskatoon, Saskatchewan, S7W 0W3; Canada

Information
- Type: Elementary
- Religious affiliation: Catholic
- Opened: 2017
- School board: Greater Saskatoon Catholic Schools
- Principal: Rick Garman
- Grades: Kindergarten to Grade 8
- Enrollment: 252 (2017)
- Education system: Separate
- Language: English
- Feeder to: St. Joseph High School
- Website: St. Nicholas Catholic School

Sylvia Fedoruk School
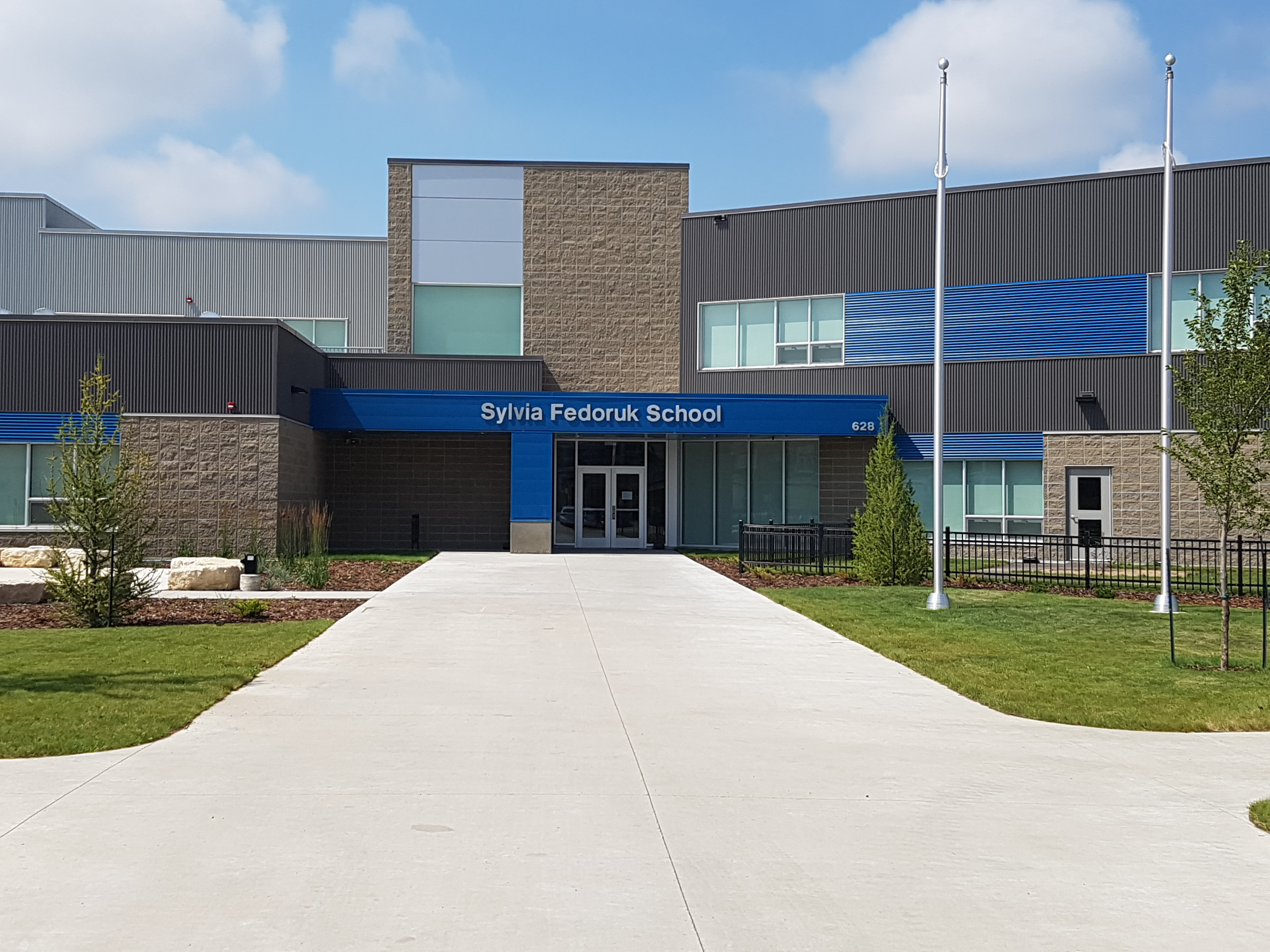
- 628 Manek Road; Saskatoon, Saskatchewan, S7W 0W3; Canada

Information
- Type: Elementary
- Opened: 2017
- School board: Saskatoon Public School Division
- Principal: Miranda Low
- Grades: Kindergarten to Grade 8
- Enrollment: 391 (2017)
- Education system: Public
- Language: English
- Feeder to: Centennial Collegiate
- Website: Sylvia Fedoruk School

On October 22, 2013, the provincial government announced funding for four new P3 facilities in Saskatoon, including a joint-use public/separate school facility in Evergreen. Greater Saskatoon Catholic Schools revealed in June 2015 that the division's new elementary school in Evergeen would be named after St. Nicholas, while Saskatoon Public Schools announced in October 2016 that its new elementary school would be named after Sylvia Fedoruk.

Both schools were completed ahead of the 2017–2018 school year.

== Commercial ==
At present, Evergreen is too young a community to have any substantial commercial development. A district commercial hub is planned on the northeast side of Evergreen around the intersection of McOrmond Drive and Fedoruk Drive, but at present the closest major commercial to Evergreen is in the University Heights Suburban Centre to the south and in Aspen Ridge to the northeast.
