= Erindale, Saskatoon =

Erindale
- Neighbourhood
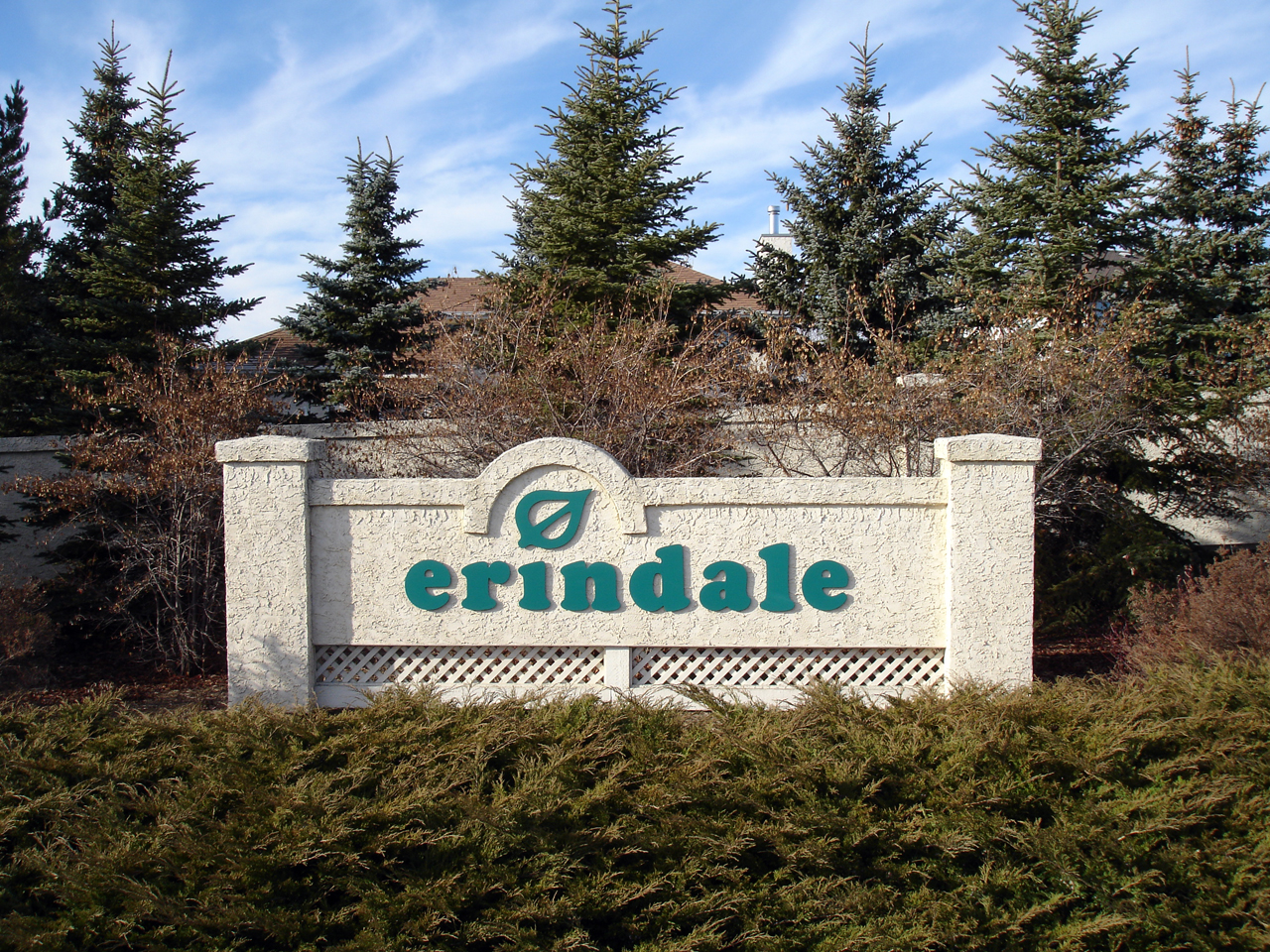
- Erindale entrance sign

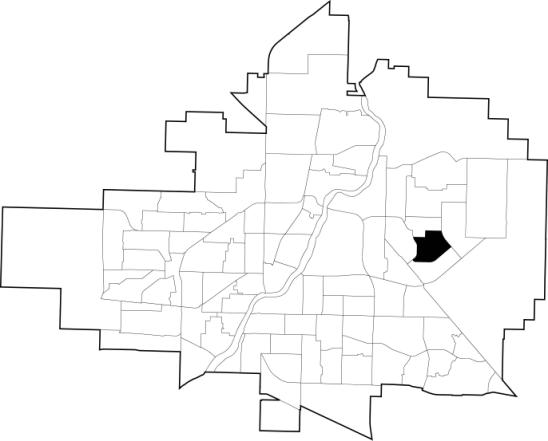
- Erindale location map
- Coordinates: 52°8′25″N 106°34′17″W
- Country: Canada
- Province: Saskatchewan
- City: Saskatoon
- Suburban Development Area: University Heights
- Neighbourhood: Erindale
- Annexed: 1980-1984
- Construction: 1986-2001

Government
  - Type: Municipal (Ward 10)
  - Administrative body: Saskatoon City Council
  - Councillor: Zach Jeffries

Area
  - Total: 1.35 km^{2} (0.52 sq mi)

Population (2011)
  - Total: 4,338
  - Average Income: $123,336
- Time zone: UTC-6 (UTC)
- Website: www.erindalearborcreek.org

Erindale is a primarily residential neighbourhood located in northeast Saskatoon, Saskatchewan, Canada. It is mostly made up of low-density single detached dwellings. As of 2011, the area is home to 4,338 residents. The neighbourhood is considered a high-income area, with an average family income of $123,336, an average dwelling value of $340,990 and a home ownership rate of 95.3%.

== History ==
The land on which Erindale now sits was annexed over three decades: 1950 to 1959, 1970 to 1979, and 1980 to 1984. The majority of residential construction was done between 1986 and 2001, with a small amount of construction before this. The housing stock is composed mostly of low density, single detached houses. Roadways feature the names of local artists of some fame. Father Robinson School was built starting in 1989, and opened in the fall of 1992.

== Government and politics ==
Erindale exists within the federal electoral district of Saskatoon—University. It is currently represented by Corey Tochor of the Conservative Party of Canada, first elected in 2019.

Provincially, the area is within the constituency of Saskatoon Willowgrove. It is currently represented by Ken Cheveldayoff of the Saskatchewan Party, first elected in 2003.

In Saskatoon's non-partisan municipal politics, Erindale lies within ward 10. It is currently represented by Zach Jeffries, first elected in 2012.

== Education ==
Dr. John G. Egnatoff School
- 225 Kenderdine Road; Saskatoon, Saskatchewan, S7N 3V2; Canada

Information
- Type: Elementary
- Opened: 1988
- School board: Saskatoon Public School Division
- Principal: Genevieve Wood
- Grades: Kindergarten to Grade 8
- Enrollment: 525 (2017)
- Education system: Public
- Language: English
- Feeder to: Centennial Collegiate
- Website: Dr. John G. Egnatoff School

Father Robinson School
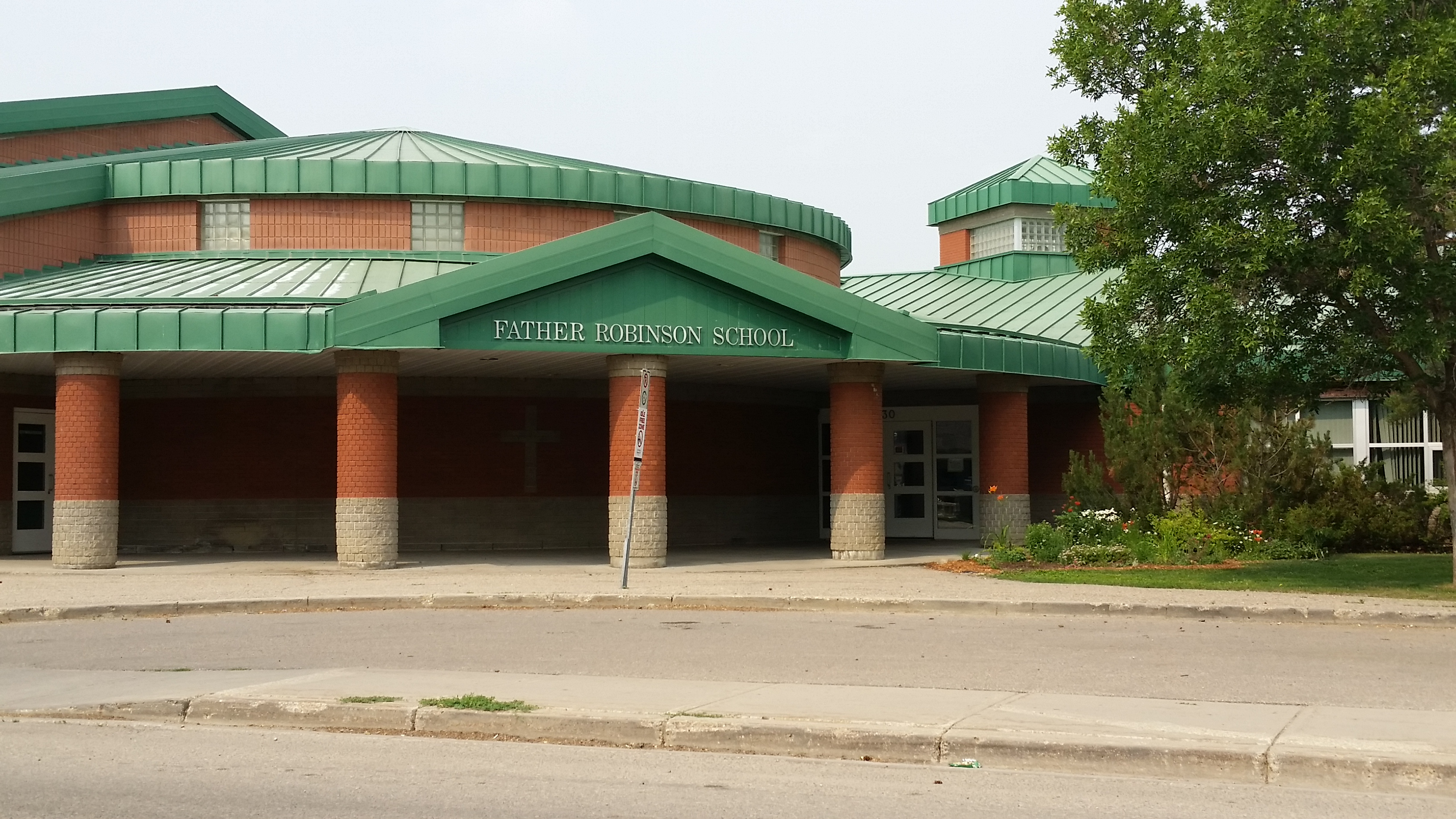
- 530 Rogers Road; Saskatoon, Saskatchewan, S7N 3Z3; Canada

Information
- Type: Elementary
- Religious affiliation: Catholic
- Opened: 1992
- School board: Greater Saskatoon Catholic Schools
- Principal: Sherry McLean
- Grades: Kindergarten to Grade 8
- Enrollment: 448 (2017)
- Education system: Separate
- Language: English
- Feeder to: St. Joseph High School
- Website: Father Robinson School

- Dr. John G. Egnatoff School - public elementary, part of the Saskatoon Public School Division
- Father Robinson School - separate (Catholic) elementary, part of Greater Saskatoon Catholic Schools

== Parks and recreation ==
- Don Ross Park (0.5 acres)
- John Avant Park (21.2 acres)
- Ernest Lindner Park (13.2 acres) - features a fully accessible playground for disabled children

The Erindale/Arbor Creek Community Association organizes events and activities for its residents. Programs operate out of Father Robinson, and Dr. John G. Egnatoff Schools as well as neighbourhood parks. The Association also plays an important role in representing the interests of residents in key community issues such as schools and parks.

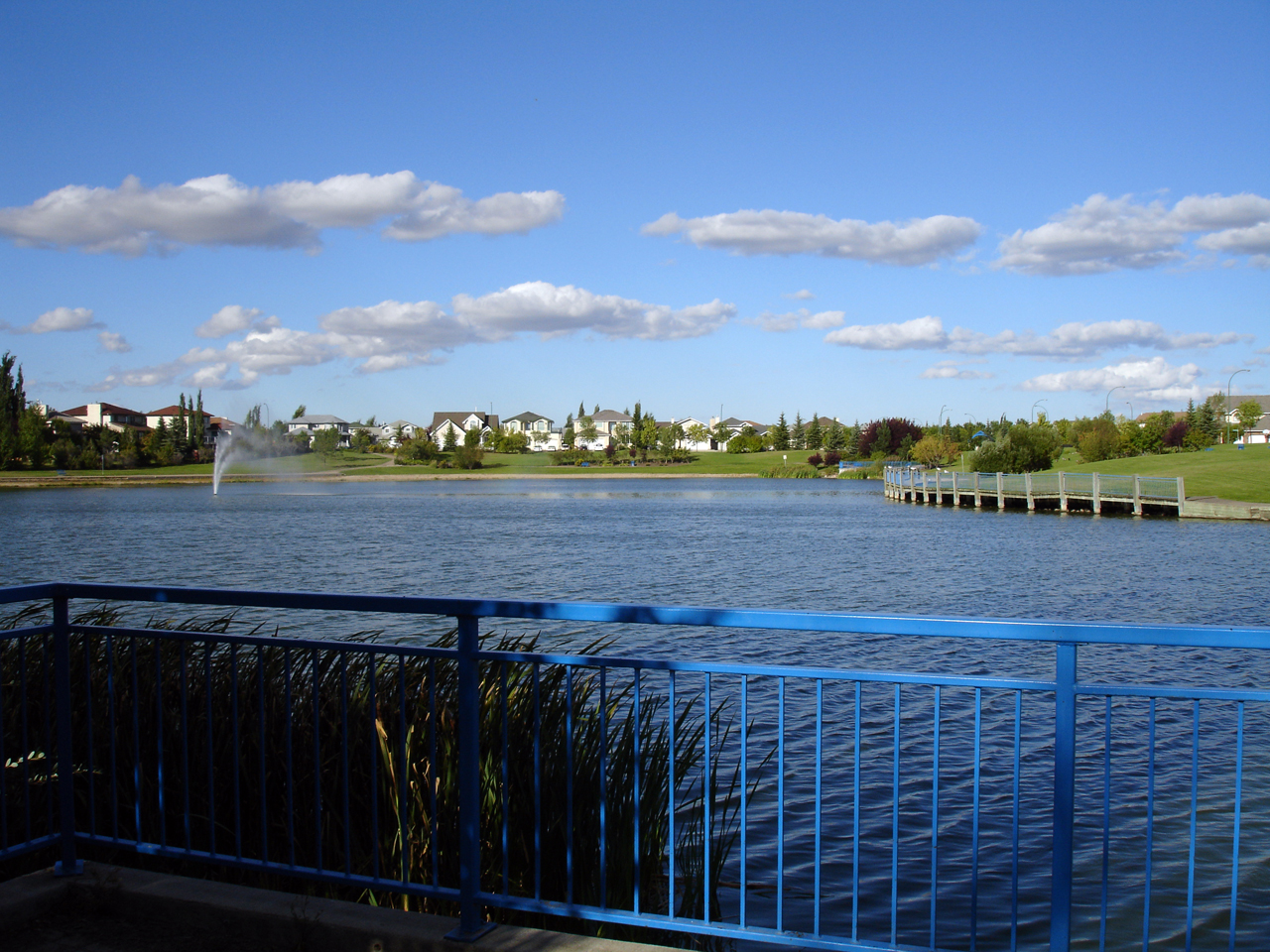
John Avant Park

== Commercial ==
Because of the adjacent University Heights Suburban Centre, there is almost no commercial development in Erindale. There is only one commercial building - a Mac's convenience store on the corner of Kenderdine Road and Kerr Road. 52 home-based businesses exist in the area.

== Location ==
Erindale is located within the University Heights Suburban Development Area. It is bounded by McOrmond Drive to the east, Kerr Road to the south, Berini Drive to the west, and 115th Street/Kenderdine Road/Attridge Drive/ to the north. Inside those boundaries, the roads are a mix of local and collector roads.
