= Willowgrove, Saskatoon =

Willowgrove
- Neighbourhood
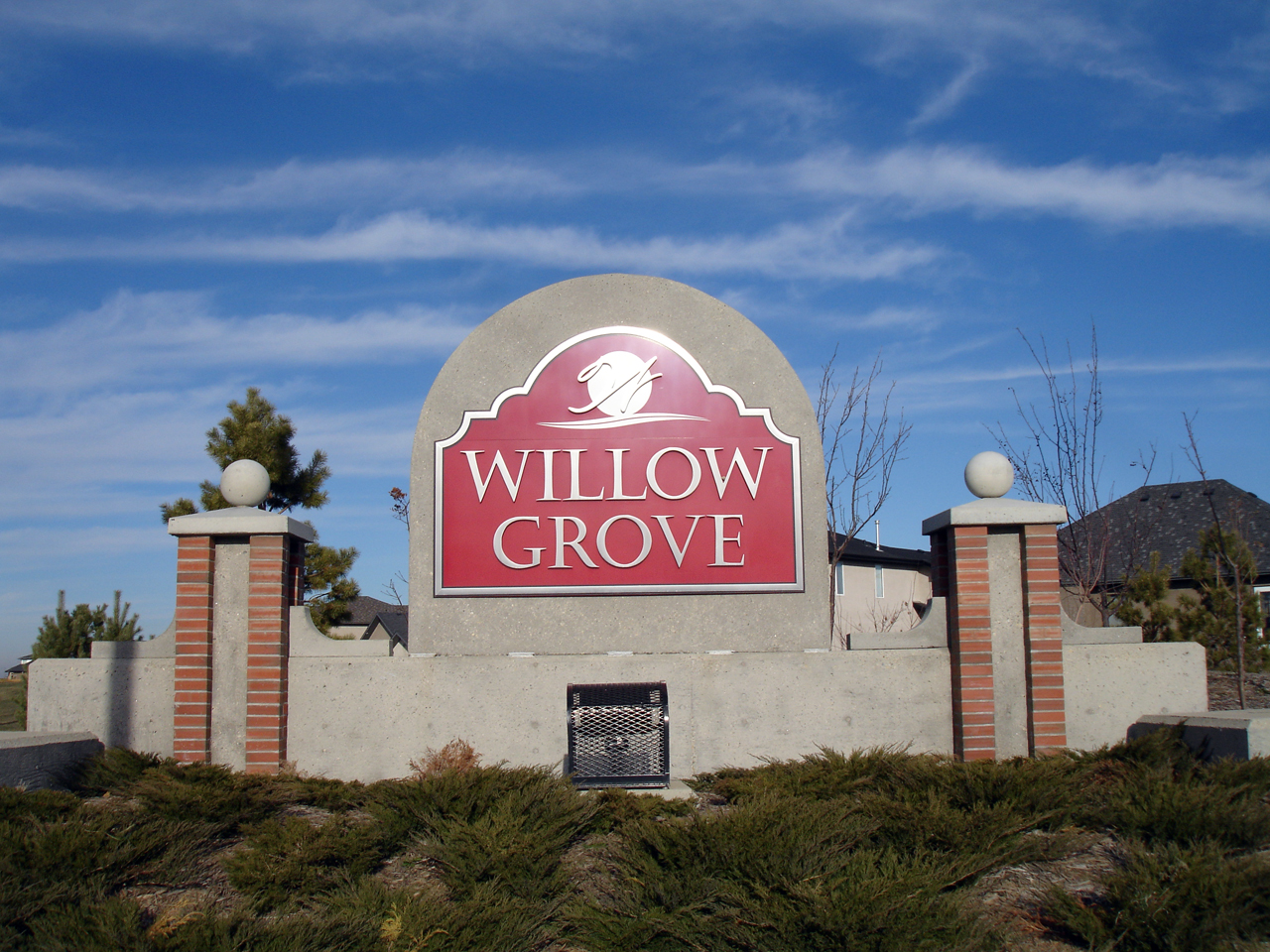
- Willowgrove entrance sign

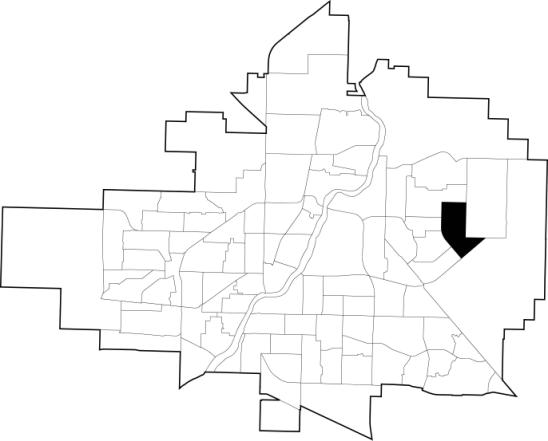
- Willowgrove location map
- Coordinates: 52°8′56″N 106°33′19″W
- Country: Canada
- Province: Saskatchewan
- City: Saskatoon
- Suburban Development Area: University Heights
- Neighbourhood: Willowgrove
- Annexed: 1975-1984
- Construction: 2004-2017

Government
  - Type: Municipal (Ward 10)
  - Administrative body: Saskatoon City Council
  - Councillor: Zach Jeffries
  - Member of Legislature: Ken Cheveldayoff
  - Member of Parliament: Corey Tochor

Area
  - Total: 2.114 km^{2} (0.816 sq mi)

Population (2022)
  - Total: 5’635
  - Average Income: $96,002
- Time zone: UTC-6 (UTC)
- Website: wuhca.ca

Willowgrove is a primarily residential neighbourhood located in the east side of Saskatoon, Saskatchewan, Canada. It comprises a mix of mainly single-family detached houses and fewer multiple-unit dwellings. As of 2011, the area is home to 3,973 residents. The neighbourhood is considered a middle to high-income area, with an average family income of $96,002, an average dwelling value of $218,357 and a home ownership rate of 84.8%.

== History ==
The land for Willowgrove was annexed between 1975 and 1984. Residential construction did not start until 2004. The housing stock is mostly composed of single-family detached houses, as well as some multiple-unit condominiums.

Willowgrove was planned as a neighbourhood that centered on a village square. It incorporates features from older neighbourhoods (e.g. Nutana) such as narrow, long lots and back lanes. A system of linear parks connects the various parts of the neighbourhood with green spaces, and provides pedestrian linkages. The village square, still under construction at present, will feature limited commercial development as well as higher density residential housing. The urban design of Willowgrove reflect some of the concepts of New Urbanism and the urban village.

As with most Saskatoon neighbourhoods, street names honour various notables in the city's history. A number of names previously assigned to streets in Marquis Industrial prior to a reconfiguration of that region, were reassigned to streets in Willowgrove, such as Thode, Van Impe and Greaves.

== Government and politics ==
Willowgrove exists within the federal electoral district of Saskatoon—University. It is currently represented by Corey Tochor of the Conservative Party of Canada, first elected in 2019.

Provincially, the area is within the constituency of Saskatoon Willowgrove. It is currently represented by Ken Cheveldayoff of the Saskatchewan Party, first elected in 2003.

In Saskatoon's non-partisan municipal politics, Willowgrove lies within ward 10. It is currently represented by Zach Jeffries, first elected in 2012.

== Institutions ==
=== Education ===
Holy Family Catholic School
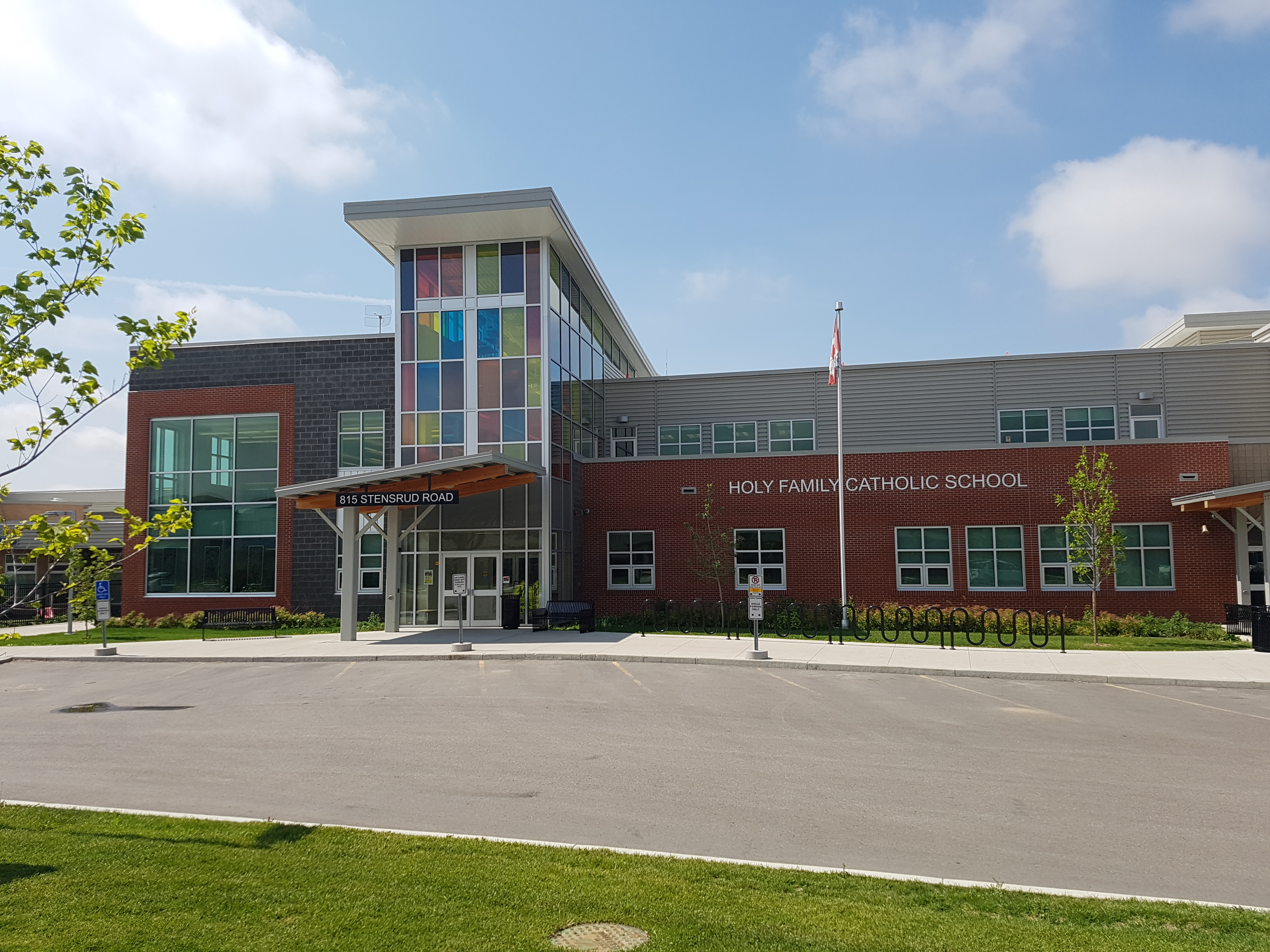
- 815 Stensrud Road; Saskatoon, Saskatchewan, S7W 0M9; Canada

Information
- Type: Elementary
- Religious affiliation: Catholic
- Opened: 2015
- School board: Greater Saskatoon Catholic Schools
- Principal: Leanne McGettigan
- Grades: Kindergarten to Grade 8
- Enrollment: 506 (2017)
- Education system: Separate
- Language: English
- Feeder to: St. Joseph High School
- Website: Holy Family School

Willowgrove School
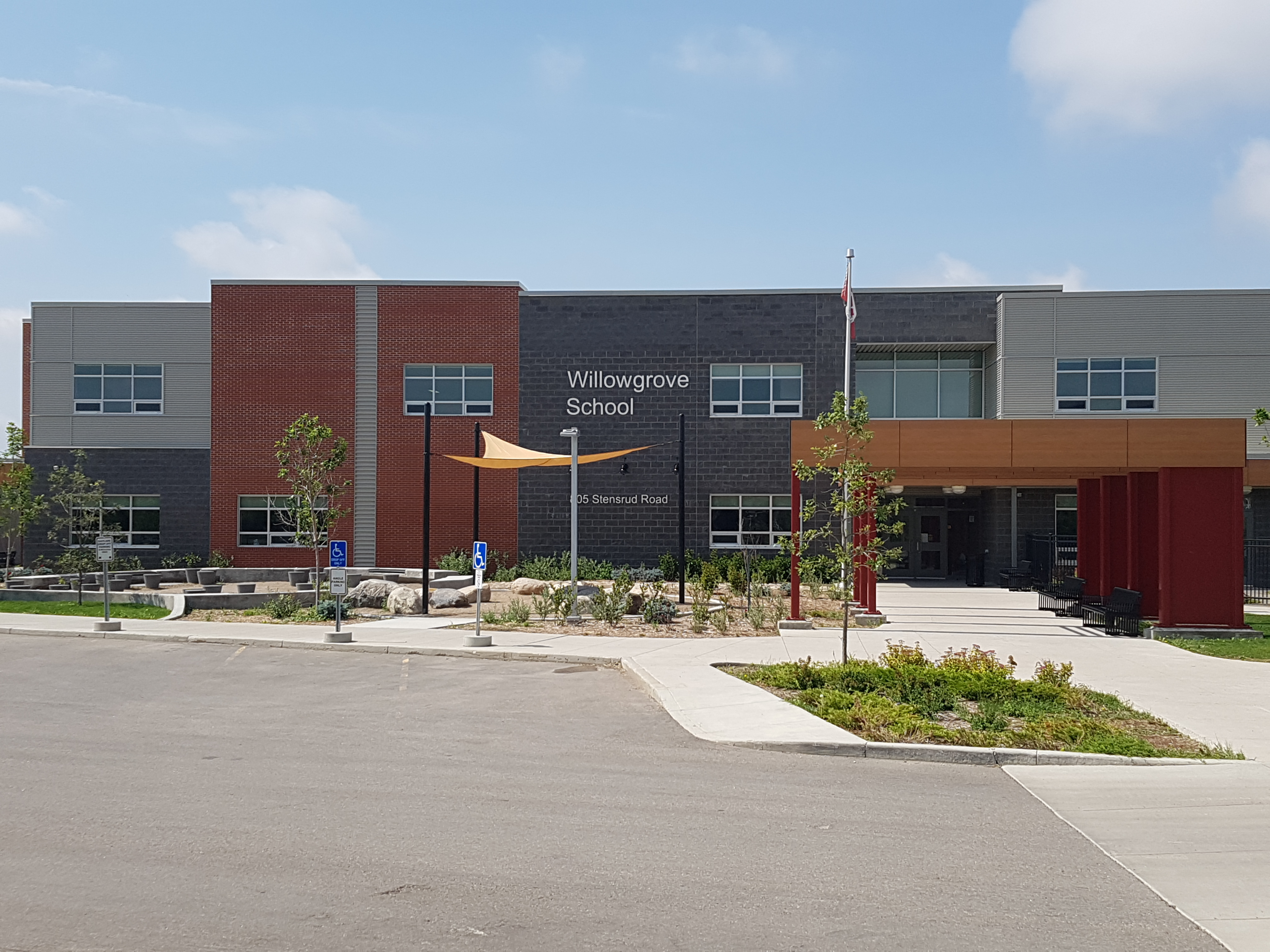
- 805 Stensrud Road; Saskatoon, Saskatchewan, S7W 0M9; Canada

Information
- Type: Elementary
- Opened: 2015
- School board: Saskatoon Public School Division
- Principal: Colette Delainey
- Grades: Kindergarten to Grade 8
- Enrollment: 612 (2017)
- Education system: Public
- Language: English
- Feeder to: Centennial Collegiate
- Website: Willowgrove School

Planning to build schools in Willowgrove began in 2007. Land was allocated for the construction of schools and a multi-use community centre at the corner of Willowgrove Boulevard and Stensrud Road. On March 18, 2010, the provincial government announced funding for the construction of a joint public/separate school building. Construction began in April 2013 and was completed behind schedule in March 2015.

- Holy Family Catholic School - separate (Catholic) elementary, part of Greater Saskatoon Catholic Schools.
- Willowgrove School - public elementary, part of the Saskatoon Public School Division

== Parks and recreation ==
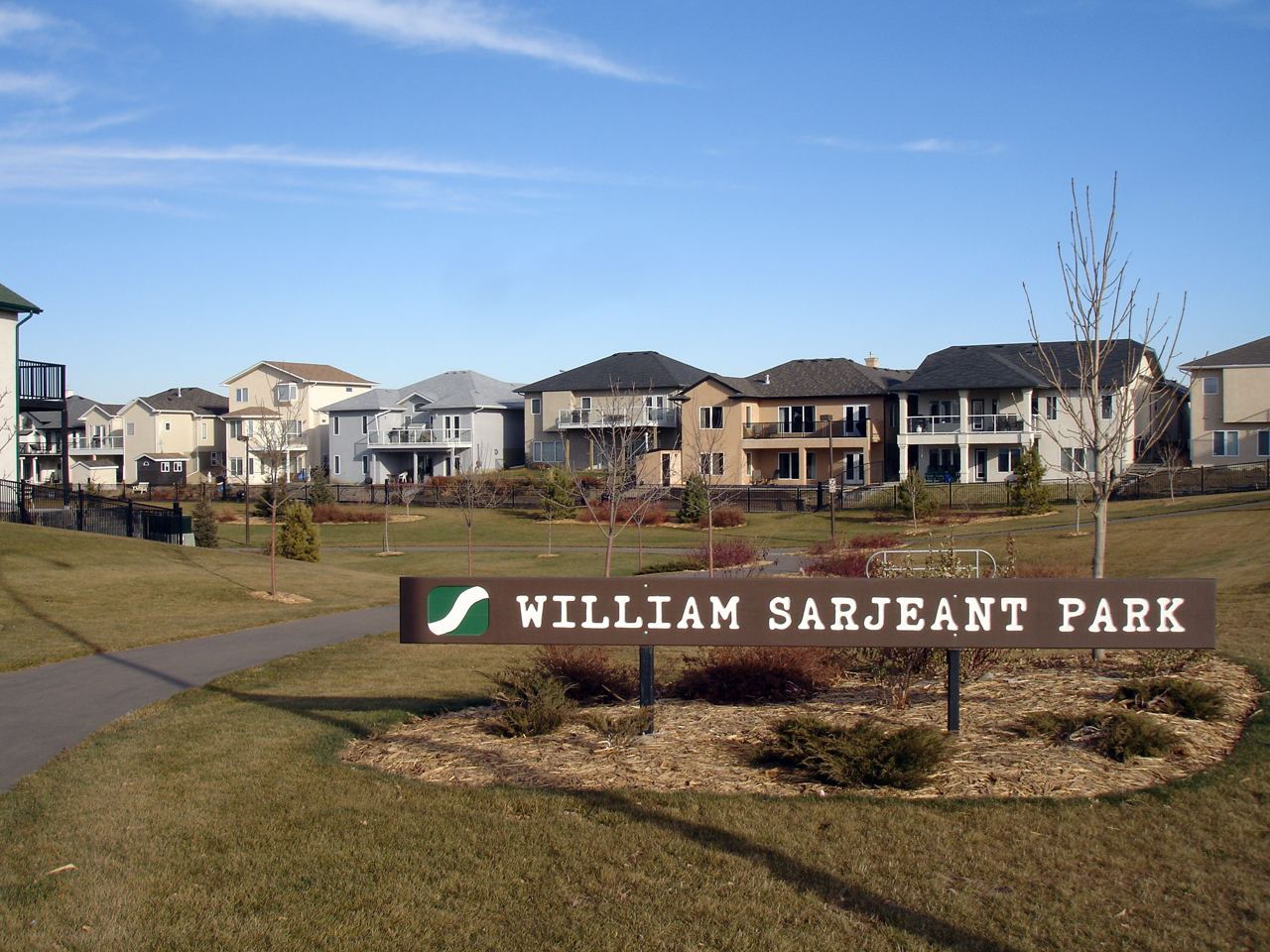
William Sarjeant Park

- Wallace Park 11.6 acres (4.7 ha)
- Kusch Park 2.7 acres (1.1 ha)
- Foster Park 2.3 acres (0.93 ha)
- John Duerkop Park 1.7 acres (0.69 ha)
- Varley Park 1.4 acres (0.57 ha)
- William Sarjeant Park 0.9 acres (0.36 ha)
- Rouillard Park 0.8 acres (0.32 ha)
- Willowgrove Square 0.4 acres (0.16 ha)
- Genereux Park 0.3 acres (0.12 ha)
- Kershaw Park 0.3 acres (0.12 ha)

The Willowgrove/University Heights community association works to provide activities to promote quality of life and a sense of community for all residents.

== Commercial ==
Willowgrove has limited commercial development centered on its "village square" or home based business. The area's main commercial needs are met by businesses in the neighbouring University Heights Suburban Centre.

== Location ==
Willowgrove is located within the University Heights Suburban Development Area and is located at the eastern edge of the city limits. It is bounded by McOrmond Drive to the west, Highway 5 to the south, an arbitrary boundary to the north and Holmwood SDA, Saskatoon (annexed from R.M. of Corman Park) to the east. Roads are laid out in a modern system of local roads and collector roads connecting to the primary arterial road (McOrmond Drive). To the north and east, farmland maintained by the University of Saskatchewan provides greenbelt separation from other current and future neighbourhoods in the region.
