= University Heights Urban Centre, Saskatoon =

University Heights Urban Centre
- Neighbourhood
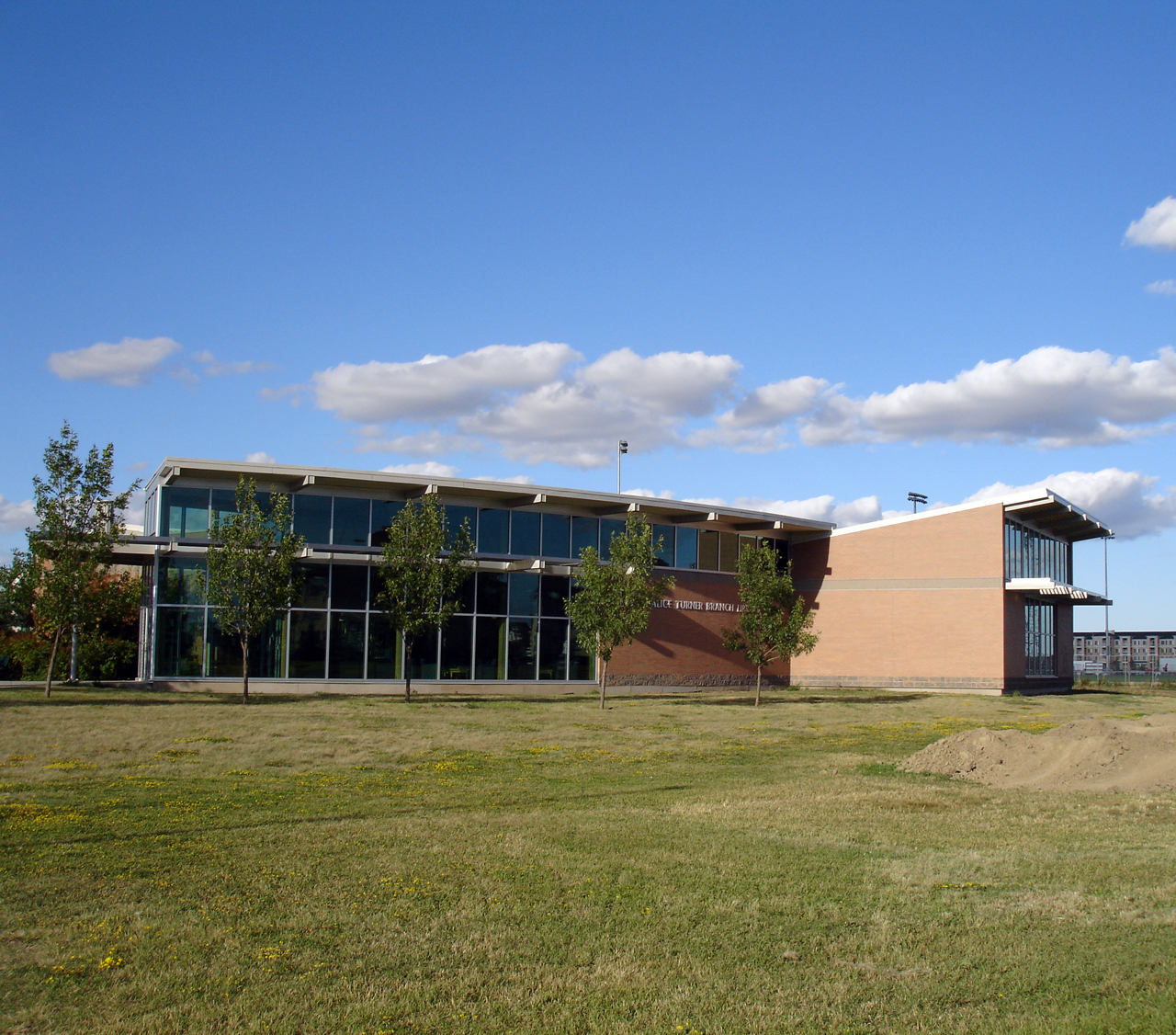
- Alice Turner Branch Library

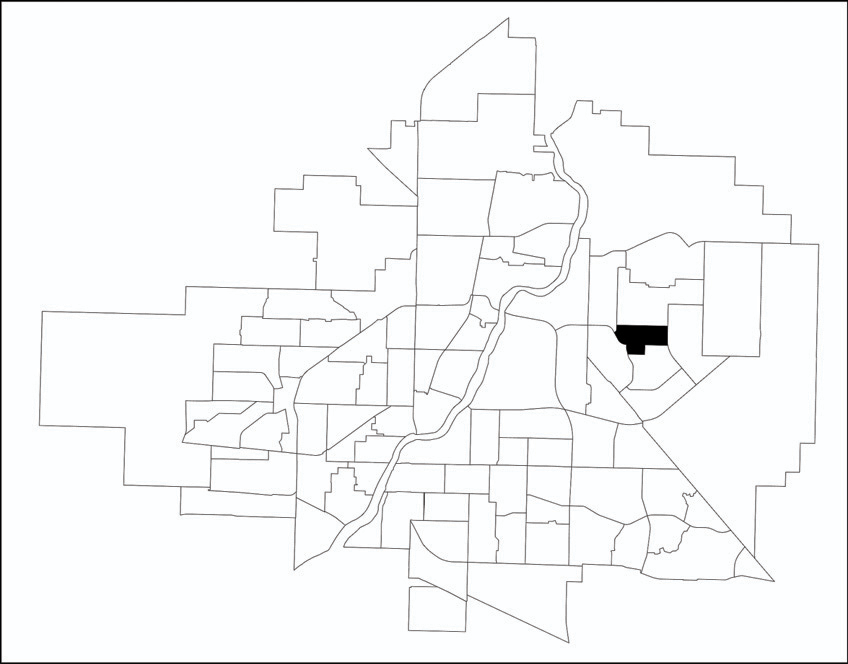
- University Heights UC location map
- Coordinates: 52°8′55″N 106°34′34″W
- Country: Canada
- Province: Saskatchewan
- City: Saskatoon
- Sector: University Heights
- Annexed: 1975-1979
- Construction: 1986-2015

Government
  - Type: Municipal (Ward 10)
  - Administrative body: Saskatoon City Council
  - Councillor: Zach Jeffries
  - Member of Legislature (MLA): Paul Merriman (SKP)
  - Member of Legislature (MLA): Ken Cheveldayoff (SKP)
  - Member of Parliament (MP): Corey Tochor (CON)

Area
  - Total: 0.91 km^{2} (0.35 sq mi)

Population (2022)
  - Total: 1,782
  - Average Income: $69,219
- Time zone: UTC-6 (UTC)

University Heights Urban Centre, previously known as University Heights Suburban Centre, is a mixed-development neighbourhood located in northeast Saskatoon, Saskatchewan, Canada. It is a classified as a "suburban centre" subdivision, composed of medium to high-density multiple-unit dwellings, commercial areas and civic facilities. As of 2009, the area is home to 1,479 residents. The neighbourhood is considered a middle-income area, with an average family income of $69,219, an average dwelling value of $237,698 and a home ownership rate of 85.7%. According to MLS data, the average sale price of a home as of 2013 was $304,903.

== History ==
The land for the University Heights Urban Centre was annexed between 1975 and 1979. The majority of residential construction was done after 1996, with a small amount of construction in the decade before this. The housing stock is composed entirely of low-rise apartment style condominiums and townhouses.

St. Joseph High School was built in 1995, and was the only secondary school in the northeast part of Saskatoon for many years. The landscape around the school is natural prairie grassland, and linked into the Meewasin Valley trail system. Centennial Collegiate opened in 2006, making it the area's first public high school.

This is actually Saskatoon's second community of this name. In the first half of the 20th century a community called University Heights was developed north of the current University of Saskatchewan campus, with a modest number of residences being built. By the 1960s, the community had been decommissioned and the land reverted to the university. Today, the U of S's Innovation Place business park is located there.

== Government and politics ==
University Heights Urban Centre exists within the federal electoral district of Saskatoon—University. It is currently represented by Corey Tochor of the Conservative Party of Canada, first elected in 2019 and re-elected in 2021

Provincially, the area is divided into the constituencies of Saskatoon Silverspring-Sutherland and Saskatoon Willowgrove. Saskatoon Silverspring-Sutherland is currently represented by Paul Merriman of the Saskatchewan Party since 2011. Saskatoon Willowgrove is currently represented by Ken Cheveldayoff of the Saskatchewan Party since 2003.

In Saskatoon's non-partisan municipal politics, University Heights Urban Centre lies within ward 10. It is currently represented by Zach Jeffries, first elected in 2012.

== Institutions ==
=== Education ===
- Centennial Collegiate - public secondary, part of the Saskatoon Public School Division
- St. Joseph High School - separate (Catholic) secondary, part of the Greater Saskatoon Catholic School Division
- Alice Turner Branch Library - officially opened in December 1998, replacing the Sutherland Library on Central Avenue. It is named after Alice Turner McFarland, who was a library employee for 37 years and chief librarian from 1981 to 1989. Turner died on December 27, 2010.

=== Churches ===
- Holy Family Cathedral - Roman Catholic Cathedral

== Parks and recreation ==
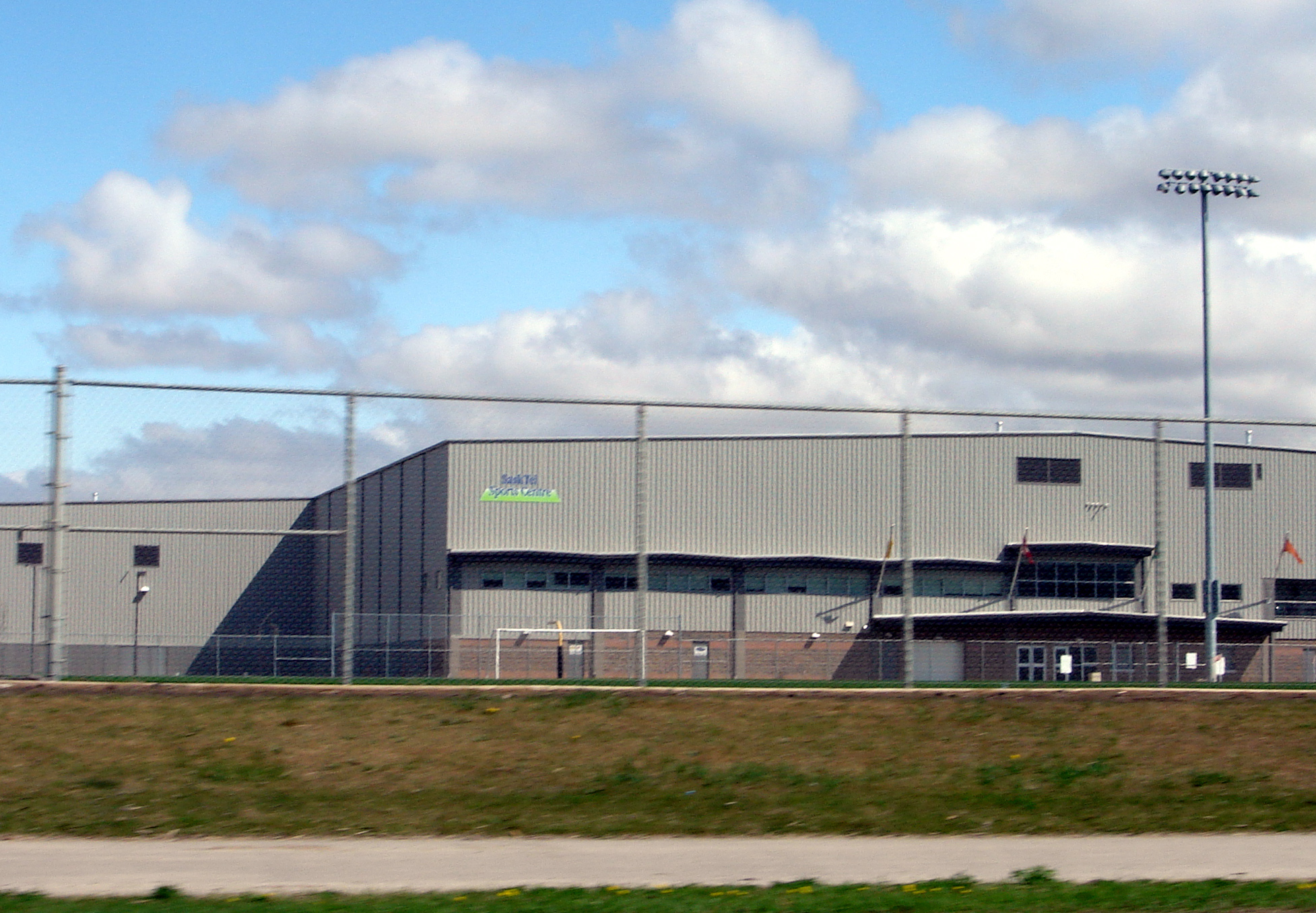
SaskTel Sports Centre

- Forest Park - 39.3 acres (15.9 ha)

The SaskTel Sports Centre is sports complex consisting of a full-sized indoor soccer field, two indoor smooth surface fields and two outdoor soccer/football fields. Other facilities include an indoor walking/jogging track and a fitness centre. A cafeteria, lounge and concessions are also located in the complex.

The Willowgrove/University Heights Community Association organizes sports, leisure programs, neighbourhood social events, and represents the community in civic matters.

== Commercial ==
University Heights Urban Centre has extensive commercial development. It is mainly concentrated at the Erindale Shopping Centre, a collection of several strip-mall buildings anchored by Saskatoon Co-op. Other commercial properties are located along Kenderdine Road south of Attridge Drive, and along Nelson Road between Lowe Road and McOrmond Drive.

University Heights Square is a 23-acre (93,000 m^{2}) site at the corner of Attridge Drive and McOrmand Drive. The development consists of several strip-mall buildings. Phase I consists of 115,000 square feet (10,700 m^{2}) of retail and 70% of the property was leased prior to construction. The development also contains an office block housing Investors Group and a medical clinic.

The University Heights Urban Centre contains branches from the major Canadian Banks: Bank of Montreal, Canadian Imperial Bank of Commerce, Royal Bank of Canada, Scotiabank, and TD Bank. TCU Financial Group also maintains a branch and offices in a standalone building.

13 home-based businesses exist in the area.

== Location ==
University Heights Urban Centre is located within the University Heights Sector. It is bounded by McOrmond Drive to the east, Lowe Road to the north, Attridge Drive/Forest Drive to the west, and Attridge Drive/Berini Drive/115th Street to the south.
