= Forestry Farm Park and Zoo =

Park and zoo in Saskatoon, Canada

Coordinates: 52.1570°N 106.5842°W

- Interactive map of Forestry Farm Park and Zoo
- Type: Municipal
- Location: 1903 Forestry Farm Park Drive; Saskatoon, SK, CA S7S 1G9
- Created: 1966
- Operator: City of Saskatoon, Saskatoon Zoo Society and Saskatchewan Perennial Society
- Open: All year

National Historic Site of Canada
- Official name: Forestry Farm Park and Zoo National Historic Site of Canada
- Designated: 1990

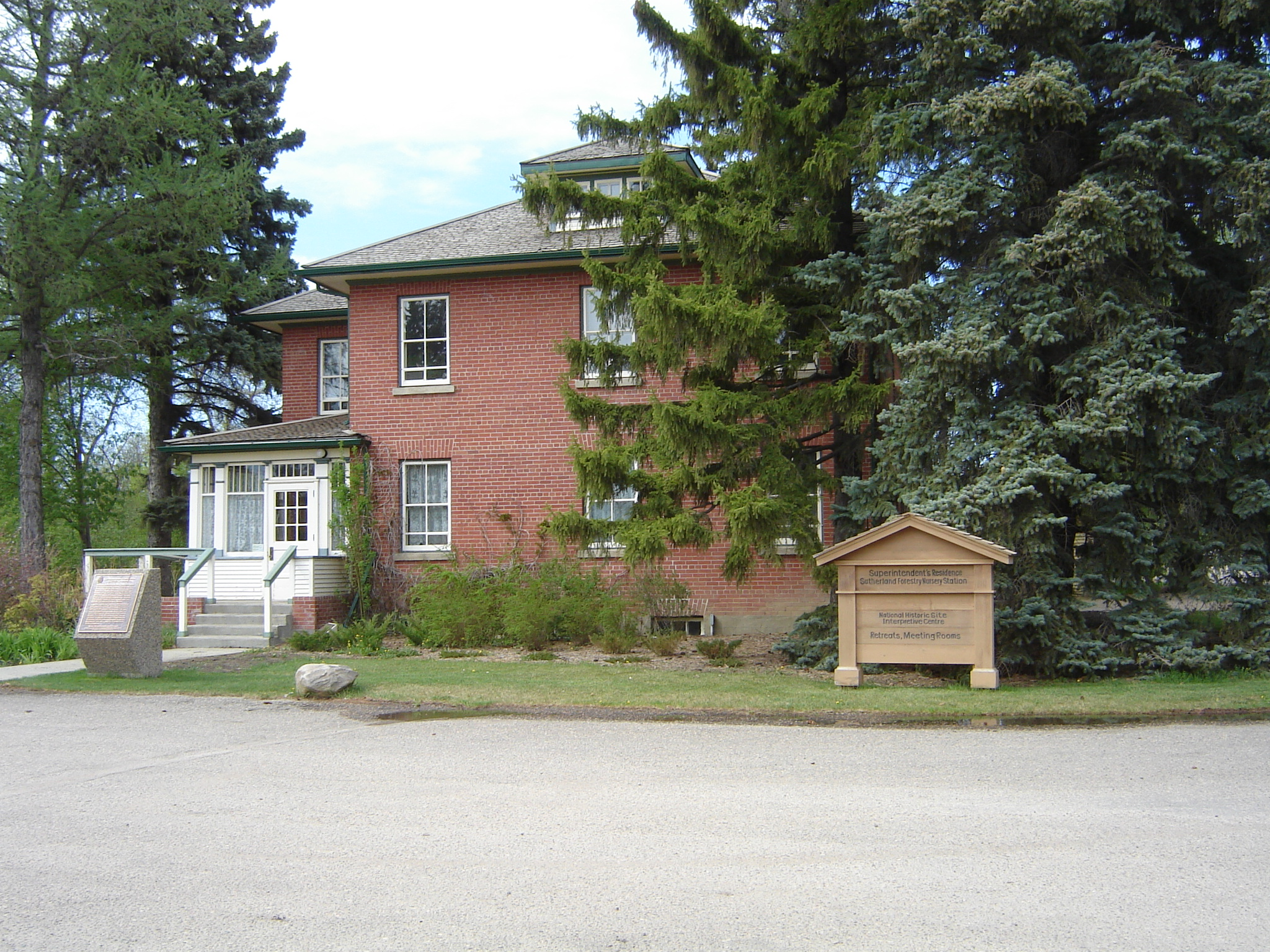
Superintendent's Residence

The Forestry Farm Park and Zoo is a forested park and zoo located in Saskatoon, Saskatchewan, Canada. The park was originally established as the Dominion Forest Nursery Station and later Sutherland Forest Nursery Station. Between 1913 and 1966 was responsible for growing and shipping 147 million trees shipped across the northern prairie provinces. The first shipment of trees were sent to farmers in 1916. The park is designated a National Historic Site of Canada. The nursery grew caragana, ash, maple, elm, and willow. After the nursery closed in 1966 a portion was re-opened as a city park. Following a $160,000 renovation to the Sutherland Forest Nursery Station, the Forestry Farm Park and Zoo was opened on September 1, 1972.

The park contains the following areas:

- Forestry Farm House (The Superintendent's Residence) – is a historical farm house of a Georgian brink design built in 1913 located within the park. The building was officially designated a heritage property on July 3, 1990. It accommodates up to 40 people.
- Hall – With a capacity of 225 people
- Gazebo Picnic Site – With seating for up to 100 people
- Fishing Pond – A Pond stocked with Rainbow Trout (daily permit required)
- Paws Inn Concession and Gift Shop – A Concession Stand and Gift Shop operated by the Zoo Society
- McDonald's Natural Place to Play Playground – An accessible nature-themed playground
- Ball Diamond and Cricket Pitch – Available for group rentals and pick-up games
- Robin Smith Meditation Garden – Cared for by the Perennial Society
- Heritage Rose Garden – Cared for by the Perennial Society
- Zoo – The zoo facilities
- Demonstration Forest – Original demonstration forest once part of the nursery.

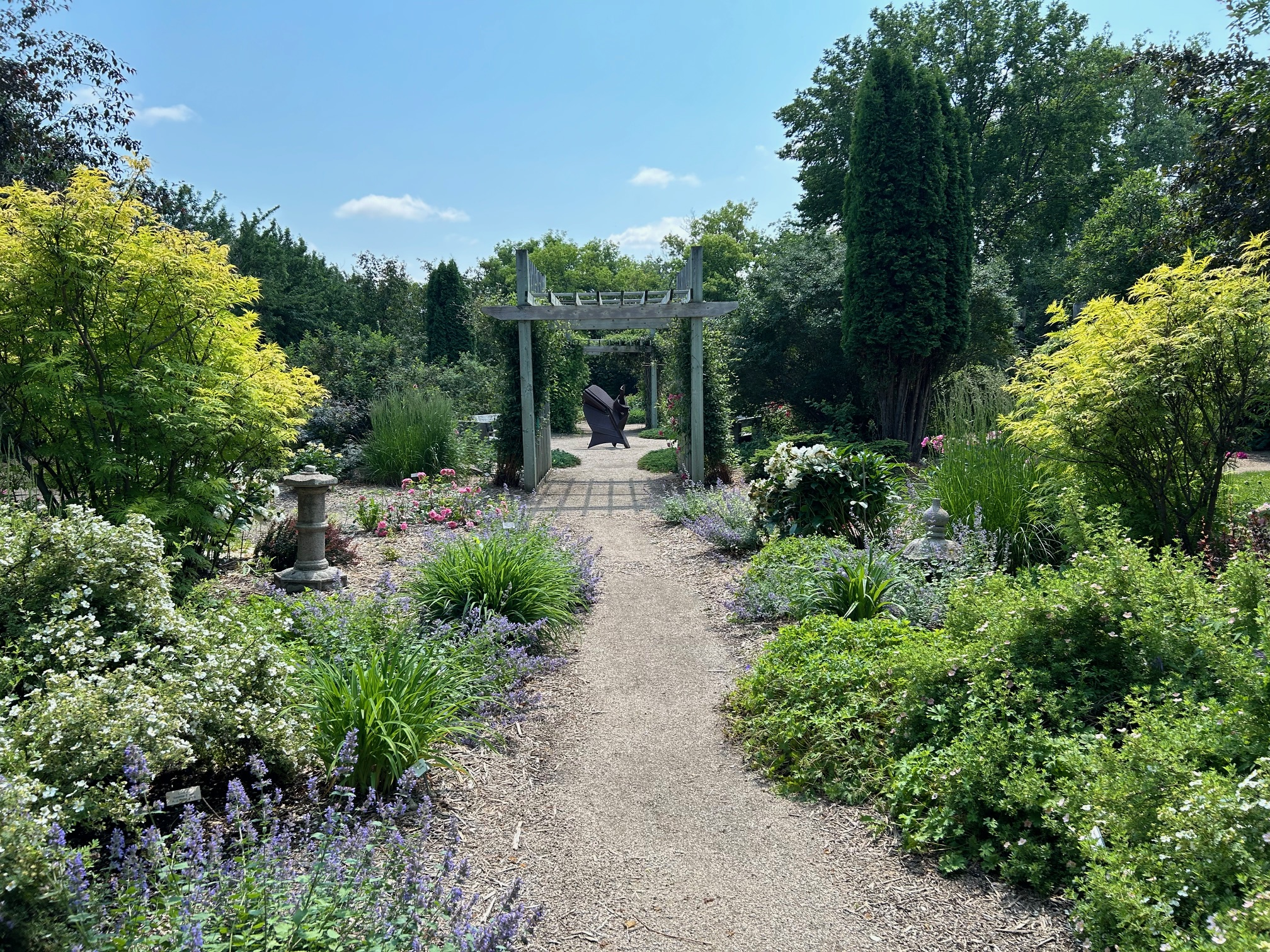
The Heritage Rose Garden in bloom

Developed long before any major residential development in the region, since the 1990s the park has been virtually surrounded by Saskatoon's urban sprawl, casting the Forestry Farm, along with several contiguous linear parks, in an additional role as part of the region's greenbelt.

The park is home to the Enchanted Forest Holiday Light Display each winter, a light display raising funds for the Saskatoon Zoo Foundation and the Saskatoon City Hospital Foundation. The annual event began in 1999. Approximately 85,000 people attended the event during its 2024-25 run, and 87,520 in the 2025-26 run.

== Zoo ==
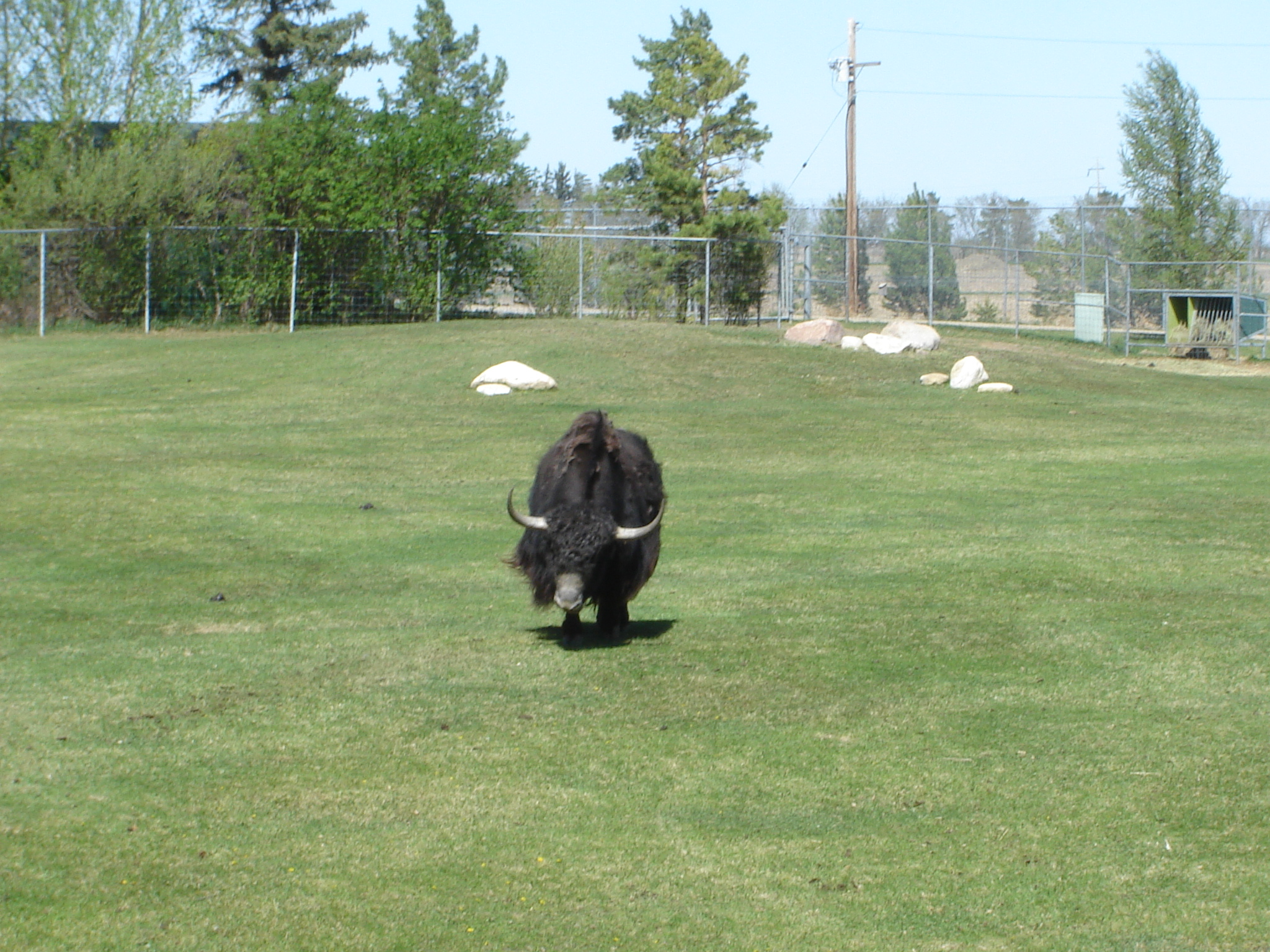
Yak

The Zoo is housed within the park. In 1964 the Golden Gate Animal Farm ran into financial difficulties, the city agreed to acquire the animals and equipment; the zoo was then relocated to the park. The Zoo is accredited by the Canadian Association of Zoos and Aquariums and contains over 80 species of animals. In 2025 the Zoo became an Institution Member of the World Association of Zoos and Aquariums, and is the only such accredited zoo in Saskatchewan. In September 2025, the Forestry Farm became the first zoo in the province to gain sensory-safe certification, following the development and rollout of a program a partnership with nonprofit organisation KultureCity. Employing 8 full-time zookeepers in 2025, in December 2025 the Saskatoon City Council approved budgetary plans to increase the number of full-time zookeepers by one in both 2026 and 2027, in order to meet and exceed standards laid out by Canada’s Accredited Zoos and Aquariums and as the Forestry Farm was pursuing Association of Zoos and Aquariums accreditation.

In June 2023, five plains zebras kept as pets near Candiac, Saskatchewan were seized by provincial conservation officers due to zebras being designated as a restricted species by the Saskatchewan Captive Wildlife Act. The zebras were transferred to the Forestry Farm, with custody officially transferred in April 2024. In June 2024, two of the zebras were transferred to Magnetic Hill Zoo in Moncton, New Brunswick after they had become a bonded pair, with integration with the other zebras risky as a result of male territoriality.

The zoo houses two male grizzly bears, named Koda and Mistaya, which were aged 20 in 2025. The Forestry Farm is currently fundraising to build a new and expanded exhibit for the grizzlies, with further phases planned to bring in black bears and polar bears into new exhibits and to supplement the number of arctic wolves housed at the zoo.

As of February 2026, the Zoo features one species listed as critically endangered (Axolotl), and one species listed as endangered (Ring-tailed Lemur) on the IUCN Red List.

The Zoo contains the following areas:

- Affinity Learning Centre – A building housing reptiles, amphibians, and fish. It also hosts facilities for educational programming
- Kinsmen Express Zoo Train – Guided tour through the zoo area, with a ramp and wheelchair accessible car It operates from June 1 - September 2
- Prairie Butterfly House – Open from June 1 - August 31
- Small Mammal House – Houses the Zoo's Goeldi's Monkeys, meerkats and African crested porcupines. It opened following renovations on June 10, 2023
- Accessible Pier – A pier into a prairie marsh. It hosts pond dipping activities from July to Labour Day
- Orano Fun Zone Playground
- Buckeye Café – Open April 1 - October 31, with all proceeds supporting the Zoo's educational programming
- Zoo Gift Shop
- Lions Event Pavilion – A 9600 square foot facility available for rent

The Saskatoon Regional Zoological Society was formed in 1976 to aid in the education program at the zoo and advance the care of the animals. The society later changed its name to the Saskatoon Zoo Society.

The Zoo engages in conservation research and education with the species in its collection, and hosts multiple autonomous recording units as part of Environment and Climate Change Canada's National Ecological Monitoring plan initiative on migratory bird habitats and breeding. The Forestry Farm is part of the Sutherland Migratory Bird Sanctuary.
