= Centennial Collegiate =

- School logo

Location
- 160 Nelson Road; Saskatoon, Saskatchewan, S7S 1P5; Canada; 52.1490°N 106.5781°W

Information
- Type: Secondary
- Motto: Honour, Respect, Service
- Opened: 2006
- School board: Saskatoon Public Schools
- Principal: Scott Ferguson
- Staff: 97
- Grades: Grade 9 to Grade 12
- Enrollment: 1,500 (2025)
- Education system: Public
- Language: English, French
- Colours: Red, gold and black
- Mascot: Charlie the Charger (Horse)
- Team name: Centennial Chargers
- Website: Centennial Collegiate

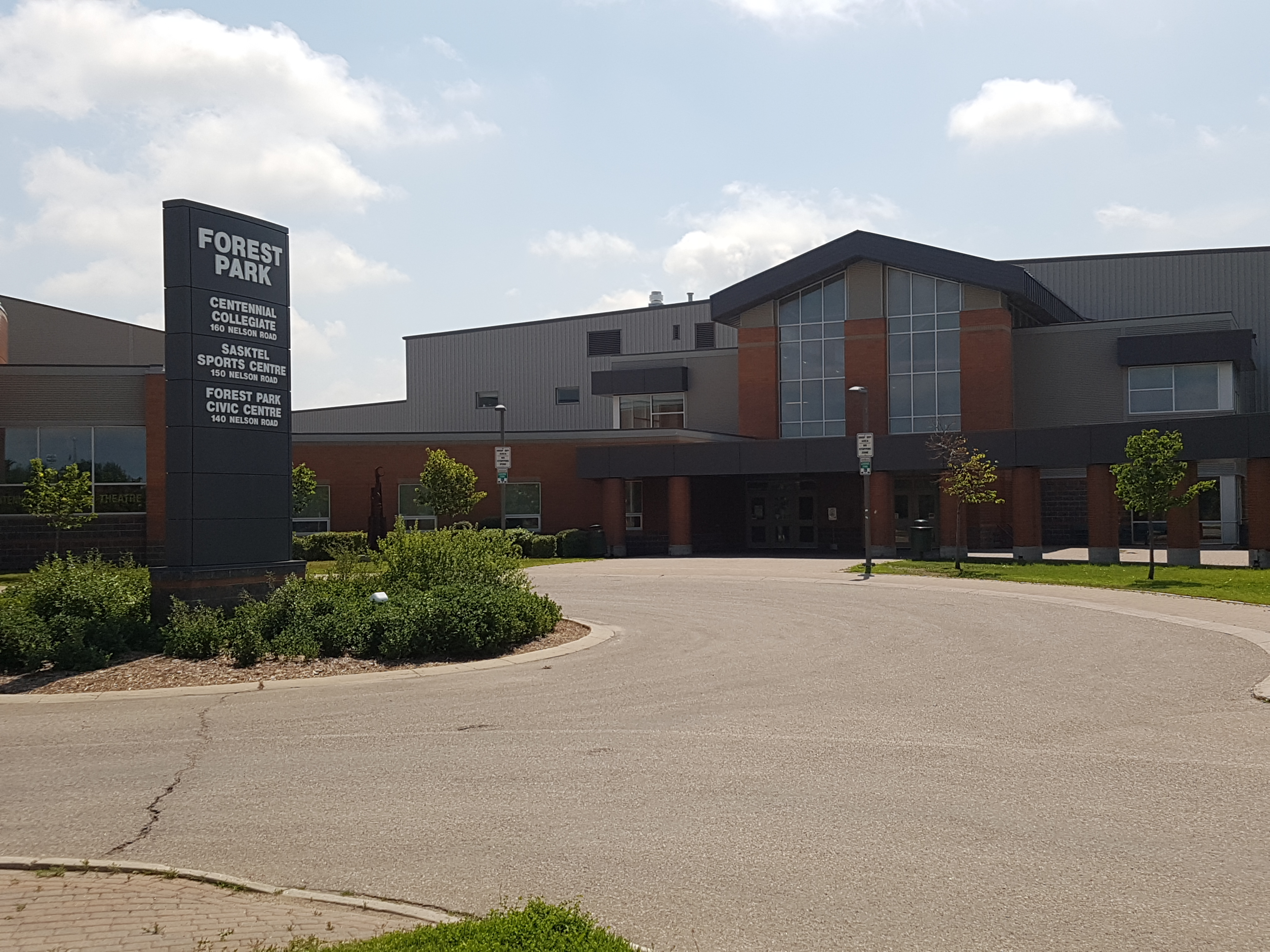

Centennial Collegiate is a secondary school located on Nelson Road in Saskatoon, Saskatchewan, Canada. As of 2025, approximately 1,500 students were enrolled. Centennial has a partnership with SaskTel Soccer Centre, making it a shared-use facility.

== History ==
Construction of Centennial Collegiate began on June 1, 2006, and it officially opened in the fall of 2006, having a total of $18.4 million invested in the construction of the school by the Saskatchewan government and the Saskatoon school division. Centennial was constructed in order to recognize Saskatchewan becoming a province and the birth of Saskatoon.

The school colors (red, black, and gold), and the team name (Chargers), were selected in 2005 by a committee of grade eights from Collegiate's feeder schools. Dylan Wingert and Braedon Harper, students of Silverspring School, designed the logo of the Collegiate.

Centennial's feeder schools are Sylvia Fedoruk School, Willowgrove School, Dr. John G. Egnatoff School, École Forest Grove School, Silverspring School, and Sutherland School.

== Academies and programs ==
Centennial Collegiate has many academies as well as other programs, such as:

- Soccer Academy
- Dance Academy
- French Immersion
- History Study Tour Program
- Music Program
- Advanced Placement Program (Calculus, English, Statistics, Physics, and Studio Arts)
- Science and Technology Program
- High-Performance Physical Performance
- Choir
- English as a Second Language (ESL)/ English as an Additional Language (EAL) programs
- Leadership 30

== Athletic teams ==
Athletic teams at Centennial Collegiate are all available to girls and boys.

Sport	Grade
Junior and senior basketball	9-12
Junior and senior badminton	9-12
Junior and senior football	9-12
Junior and senior pom squad	9-12
Junior and senior volleyball	9-12
Golf	9-12
Wrestling	9-12
Curling	9-12
Track and field	9-12
Cross country	9-12
Junior and Senior Badminton	9-12

== Clubs ==
Centennial also has many clubs for students in grade 9-12, such as:

- Allies in Action Club
- Art Club
- Environmental club
- Chess Club
- Outdoor Club
- Extreme Math
- Spirit of Youth
- Scramble Club
- Technical Theatre
- Writing Club
- Yearbook
- Book Club
- Canada Skills
- Fandom Club
- Jazz Band
- Robotics Club

== Facilities ==
Centennial Collegiate's facilities include:

- A large multi-use auxiliary gym and fitness centre
- 450-seat theatre
- Band room
- Careers centre
- Practical arts theatre
- Specialized practical and applied arts classrooms
- Library
- Dance studio
- Soccer centre

== Awards ==
Centennial Collegiate has an Extra-curricular Certificate. This award consists of three different sections:

- an athletic award certificate
- a social award certificate
- a merit award certificate

Each club or team of students who join are given points. 80 points each are needed for an athletic or social award certificate. A merit award is given when a student has 70 social and athletic points combined. These awards are given at the end of a student's grade 12th year.

The Award of Excellence is a major award in Saskatoon high schools. It is given to the most outstanding student, with a prize of $5,000 from the board.

== Notable alumni ==
- Thomas Hasal, soccer player
- Riley Pickett, BC Lions long snapper
