= Sutherland, Saskatoon =

Sutherland
- Neighbourhood
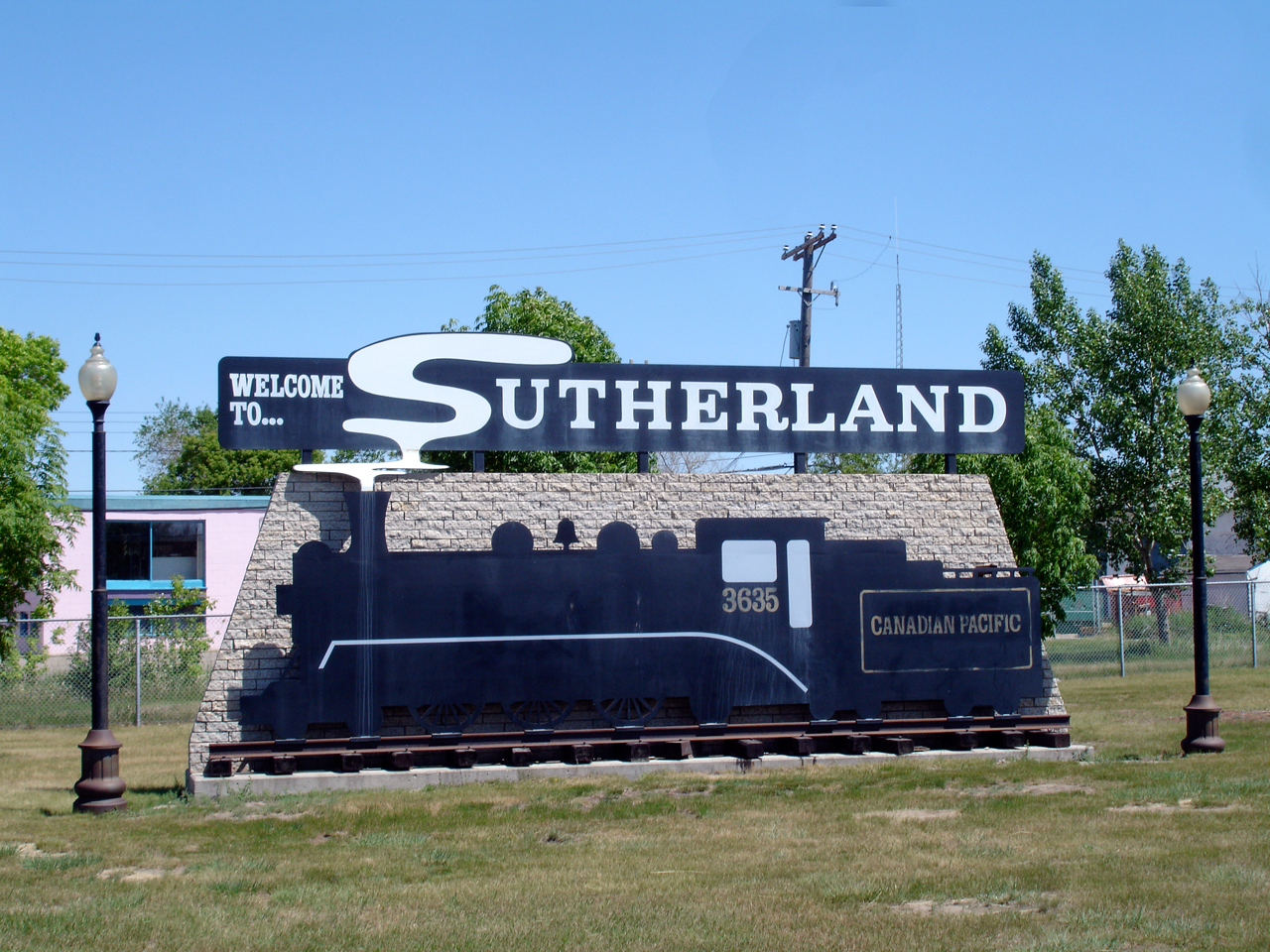
- Sutherland entrance sign

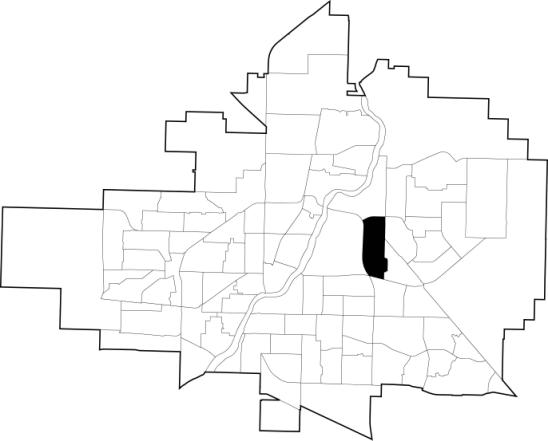
- Sutherland location map
- Coordinates: 52°8′12″N 106°36′14″W
- Country: Canada
- Province: Saskatchewan
- City: Saskatoon
- Suburban Development Area: University Heights
- Neighbourhood: Sutherland
- Settled: 1908
- Incorporated (village): 1909
- Incorporated (town): 1912
- Annexed: 1956

Government
  - Type: Municipal (Ward 1)
  - Administrative body: Saskatoon City Council
  - Councillor: Kathryn MacDonald
  - Member of Legislature (MLA): Tajinder Grewal (NDP)
  - Member of Parliament (MP): Corey Tochor (CON)
- Time zone: UTC-6 (UTC)
- Website: Sutherland-Forest Grove Community Association

Sutherland is a mostly residential neighbourhood located in east-central Saskatoon, Saskatchewan, Canada. It is an older suburban subdivision, composed of a near-even mix of single-family detached houses and multiple-unit apartment and semi-detached dwellings. The neighbourhood is a middle-income area, with a median personal income of $36,000, an average sale price of $311,0025 and a home ownership rate of 42%. Sutherland was administered as a separate town outside of Saskatoon before being annexed by the city in 1956.

== History ==
Federal census population history of Sutherland
Year	Pop.	±%
1911	421	—
1916	940	+123.3%
1921	961	+2.2%
1926	1,010	+5.1%
1931	1,148	+13.7%
1936	942	−17.9%
1941	888	−5.7%
1946	1,046	+17.8%
1951	1,329	+27.1%
Source: Statistics Canada

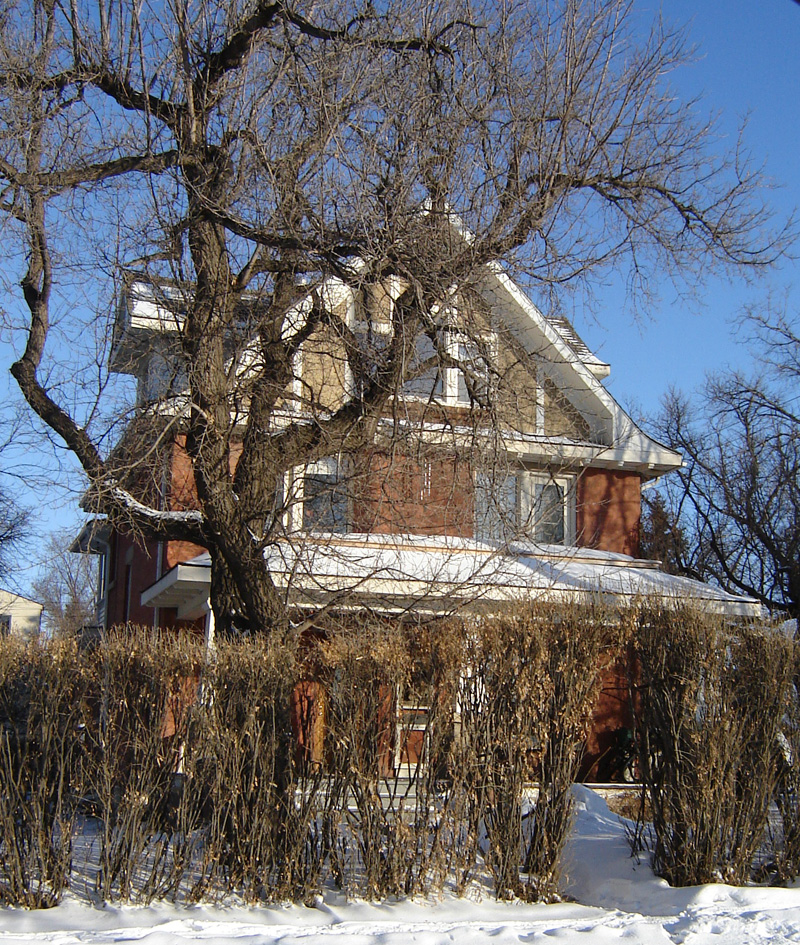
Powe Residence

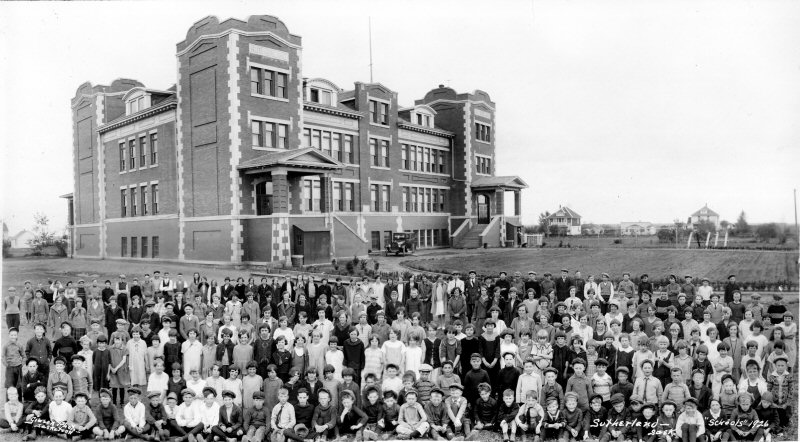
Original Sutherland School

James Powe and his family arrived in Saskatoon from Ontario in 1884. The Powe family homesteaded in the area which is now Sutherland in 1893. Their grand house, which stands on the present-day corner of Central Avenue and 115th Street, was built between 1912 and 1914. The foundation was made from local fieldstone, making the basement walls as thick as 24 inches (610 mm).

Albert Hanson, a noted Saskatoon real estate agent, bought land in the Sutherland area beginning in 1905. He then sold some of it to the Canadian Pacific Railway, whose branch line between Regina and Edmonton reached Saskatoon in 1907. The area of Sutherland was built up as the CPR yards and station were constructed 3 miles (4.8 km) east of Saskatoon. This was in keeping with the railway's practice of bypassing existing communities and building its own town sites on land it owned, thus sharing the real estate profits with no one. Hanson subdivided the rest of his land as residential and commercial properties, laid out on a typical north–south grid pattern. The railway's town site was on a grid parallel to the tracks, resulting in a triangular gap between the two areas. This became built up as an industrial area (later the separate Sutherland Industrial subdivision). Most of the subsequent population growth occurred on Hanson's land west of the tracks, due in part to the lack of schools or parks on the east side.

The first settler in the new townsite was Nelson Emery, a CPR timekeeper, storekeeper, and building inspector. In 1908, the City of Saskatoon struck an agreement to supply water to the yards. The first post office was also established that year, with W. G. Clark as its first postmaster. The first school, a temporary one-room structure, was opened in November 1908 on a site on 109th Street. On February 2, 1909, a newer one-room school was opened at the present-day Sutherland School site on Egbert Avenue and 111th Street.

By the spring of 1909 the settlement had a population of 102, and the residents applied for incorporation as a village. The village of Sutherland was created on August 30, 1909. It was named after William Charles Sutherland, a politician who served on Saskatoon's town council before it became a city in 1906. The Sutherland Curling Club was founded and built its first rink in 1910. By 1912, Sutherland's population had grown to 1000, enabling it to incorporate as a town. A new town hall was completed in January 1912, at the corner of Egbert Avenue and 108th Street. On November 12 of the same year, the cornerstone for a new multi-storey Sutherland School was laid. The grand "castle" style school opened for the 1913–1914 school year. In 1914, the town received service from the Saskatoon Municipal Railway.

With a population of 1500 by 1912, growth was stalled by the economic recession prior to World War I. Significant growth did not occur again until the 1950s - in 1956, the town was annexed by the growing city of Saskatoon. Sutherland became the city's easternmost neighbourhood until development in the 1970s took place even further east. The amalgamation required some name changes to Sutherland's streets, to avoid confusion with identically named streets already in Saskatoon (e.g. 6th Street became 106th Street). Also, some named streets were eventually renamed in order to remove conflict with existing Saskatoon streets. Examples include Fraser Street, which was named Fitzgerald Street (because Saskatoon had a Fraser Crescent), and Railway Avenue, which became Gray Avenue in deference to Saskatoon's version (which itself was closed in the 1960s). However, Sutherland's main street, Central Avenue, retained its name, even though once Sutherland became part of Saskatoon, the name was no longer accurate in a technical sense. In addition, while Lorne Avenue was generally used to demarcate "East" and "West" addressing within Saskatoon east of the river, in order to avoid having to renumber housing, a separate east–west demarcation remained in place for Sutherland (and its later adjacent communities), with Central remaining the boundary.

In 1960, a new one-storey Sutherland School was opened beside the 1913 school. By 1963, additional classrooms and an auditorium were added. The "castle" school also received some cosmetic upgrades in 1960–61, but the building had fallen into disrepair. The weakened structure was condemned in July 1967 and demolished the next month. The 1912 cornerstone was the only item preserved.

Despite its relative initial remoteness to the rest of Saskatoon, Sutherland was initially one of eastern gateways to the city, as Highway 5 entered the city along 115th Street and wound its way through the townsite, this link was later rendered redundant in the 1960s when College Street was extended eastward and became College Drive, linking up with Highway 5; 115th Street continued to connect to Highway 5, however, providing an alternate access into Sutherland until it was closed in the 1980s to facilitate residential development. Access to Sutherland was further facilitated by the completion of the northeast leg of the Circle Drive ring road in 1983, although construction of the freeway resulted in the closure of 115th Street which had previously connected with Preston Avenue; however, this link was later replaced by Attridge Drive, a major arterial branch off Circle Drive that also linked with Preston.

Just to the south of Sutherland, the intersection of Central Avenue and 8th Street became known as "Stephenson's Corner", and was a local landmark as the city's streetcar line would turn northwards towards Sutherland at that point. The area became a regional commercial hub, and continues to be so today (The Centre shopping mall is located there), although the Central Avenue link was removed with the development of College Park in the late 1960s (the portion of Central Avenue south of College Drive became Acadia Drive).

By the 1980s, neighbourhoods had developed east of Sutherland, no longer making it the city's eastern edge. At that time, Sutherland also expanded with the Dutch Growers (Reid/Adolph) subdivision north of 117th Street and west of Central Avenue. The garden centre of the same name at the corner of Central Avenue and Attridge Drive served as the focal point of the development.

Further development in the neighbourhood occurred in 2003 when the Rutherford subdivision was built along undeveloped land north of Rita Crescent and south of the Canadian Pacific Railway line along a vacant stretch of 115th Street West. 115th between Egbert and Lanyon Avenues was permanently closed in order to accommodate it, although a small portion west of Egbert remained to access Rutherford Crescent, while Lanyon was extended to meet up with the new intersection of Rutherford Crescent & Rutherford Way.

In 1984, the Sutherland-Forest Grove Community Association was founded, with its stated goal of promoting and assisting in the educational, recreational and social programs for families in the two adjacent neighbourhoods. In the 1990s, neighbourhood boundaries were redrawn, and the residential area of the former railway townsite along Gray Avenue was transferred to the Forest Grove neighbourhood.

On June 29, 2006, workers digging out fuel tanks at the Mac's convenience store on 108th Street and Central Avenue (now Circle K) unearthed human remains. Investigators determined that it was a woman who had been murdered sometime between 1910 and 1920 and thrown down a well. Her body had been preserved in a mixture of gasoline and water, enabling forensic archeologists to extract a DNA sample. In 2009, Saskatoon police released a 3-D facial reconstruction and several composite sketches of the victim, in the hope of solving the case. The woman was finally identified in 2025 through DNA matching as Alice Spence, an American immigrant. She died sometime between 1916 and 1918.

== Government and politics ==
Sutherland is located within the federal electoral district of Saskatoon—University. It is currently represented by Corey Tochor of the Conservative Party of Canada, who was first elected in 2019.

Provincially, the area is located within the constituency of Saskatoon Silverspring-Sutherland. It is currently represented by Tajinder Grewal of the Saskatchewan New Democratic Party, first elected in 2024.

Municipally, Sutherland lies within Ward 1, currently represented by Kathryn MacDonald who was first elected in 2024.

== Institutions ==
=== Education ===
Bishop Filevich Ukrainian Bilingual School
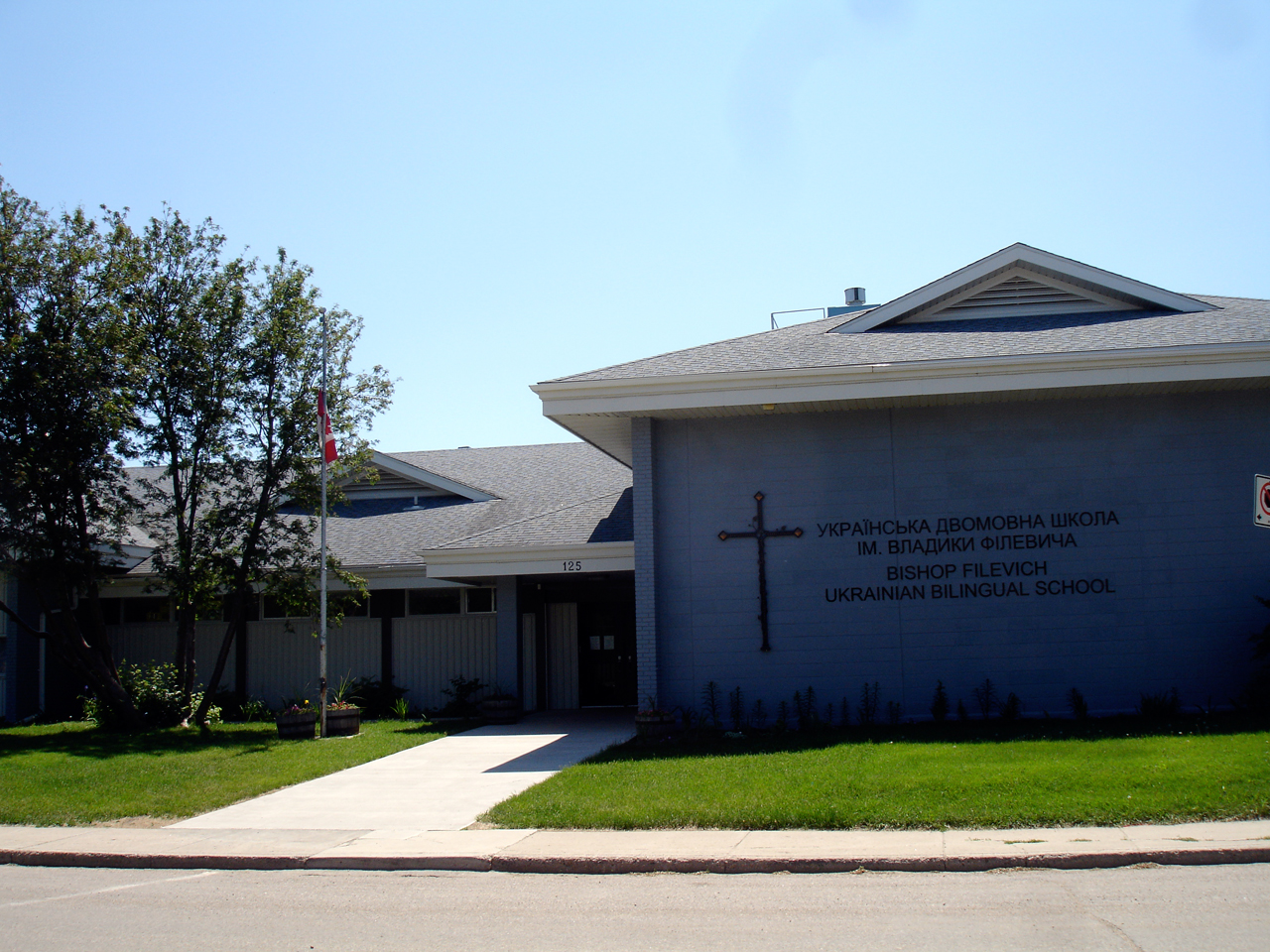
- 125 105th Street West; Saskatoon, Saskatchewan, S7N 1N3; Canada

Information
- Type: Elementary
- Religious affiliation: Catholic
- Opened: 1959
- School board: Greater Saskatoon Catholic Schools
- Principal: Chantelle Stratychuk
- Grades: Kindergarten to Grade 8
- Enrollment: 229 (2025)
- Education system: Separate
- Language: English, Ukrainian
- Colours: Black, Purple, Yellow
- Feeder to: St. Joseph High School
- Website: Bishop Filevich Ukrainian Bilingual School

Sutherland School
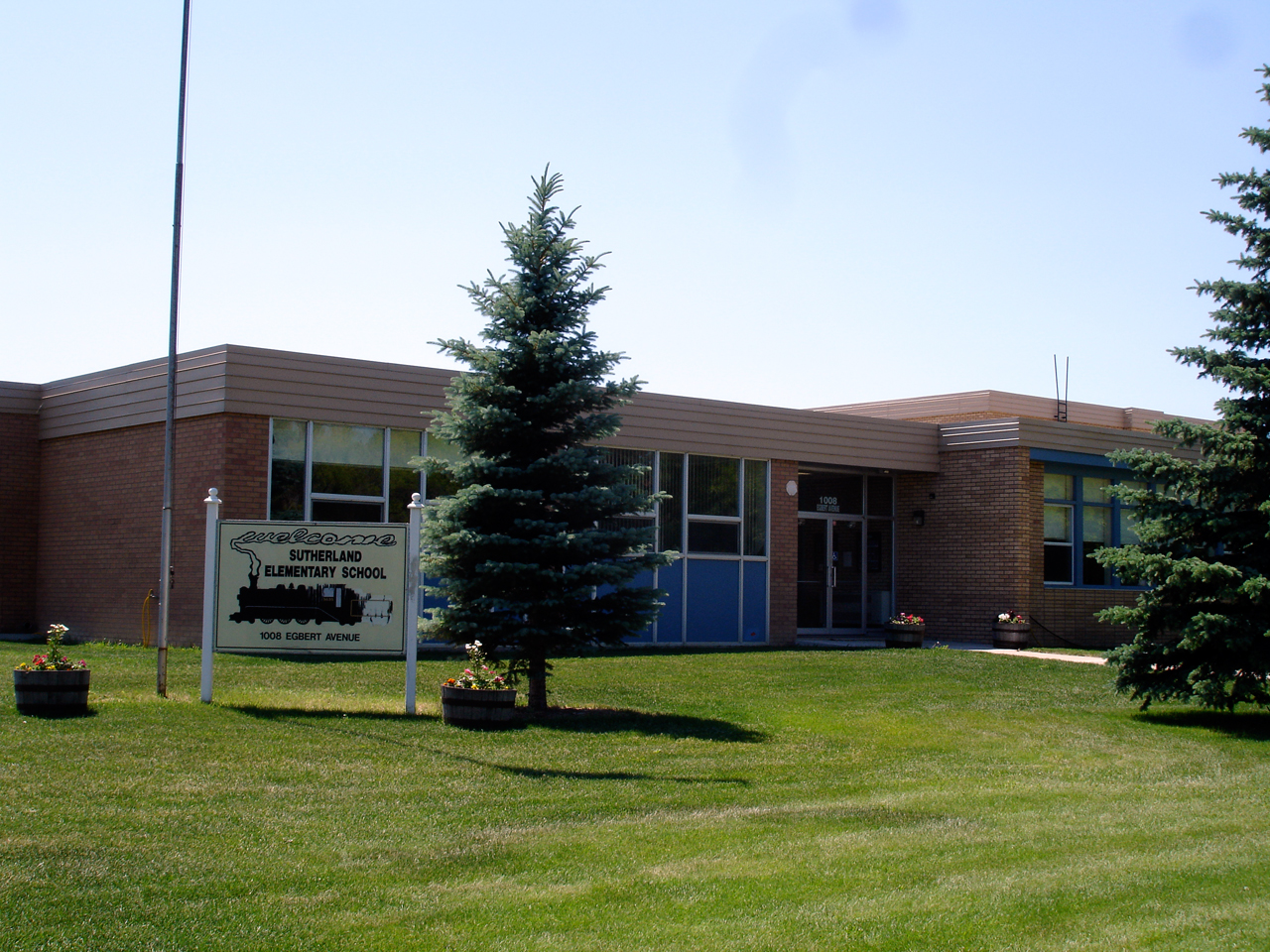
- 211 111th Street West; Saskatoon, Saskatchewan, S7N 1T2; Canada

Information
- Type: Elementary
- Opened: 1960
- School board: Saskatoon Public School Division
- Principal: Lisa Hynes
- Grades: Kindergarten to Grade 8
- Enrollment: 281 (2025)
- Education system: Public
- Feeder to: Centennial Collegiate
- Website: Sutherland School

- Bishop Filevich Ukrainian Bilingual School - separate (Catholic) elementary, part of Greater Saskatoon Catholic Schools. Formerly named Holy Family School, it was renamed officially on September 28, 2006.
- Sutherland School - public elementary, part of the Saskatoon Public School Division.
- University of Saskatchewan - located immediately west of Sutherland, with access to the main campus via 108th Street and College Drive. Additional USask facilities related to beef research and psychiatry are off Central Avenue just north of Sutherland.

== Parks and recreation ==
- Hilliard Gardner Park (1.0 acres)
- C.F. Patterson Park (1.4 acres)
- Kopko Park (1.6 acres)
- Anna McIntosh Park (2.2 acres)
- C.F. Patterson Park North (2.3 acres)
- Father Basil Markle Park (3.9 acres)
- Herbert Stewart Park (4.8 acres)
- Sutherland Park (9.1 acres)

The ACT Arena is a city-owned indoor ice rink, home to hockey, ringette, figure skating and speedskating clubs, as well as public skating and Learn-to-Skate programs.

The Sutherland-Forest Grove Community Association was incorporated in 1984 and is run by volunteers. It plans, coordinates, and administers seasonal programs for all age groups, from adult fitness to teen programs, children's sports and toddler activities. It also works with local schools and the City to maintain and operate neighbourhood parks and outdoor rinks.

== Commercial ==
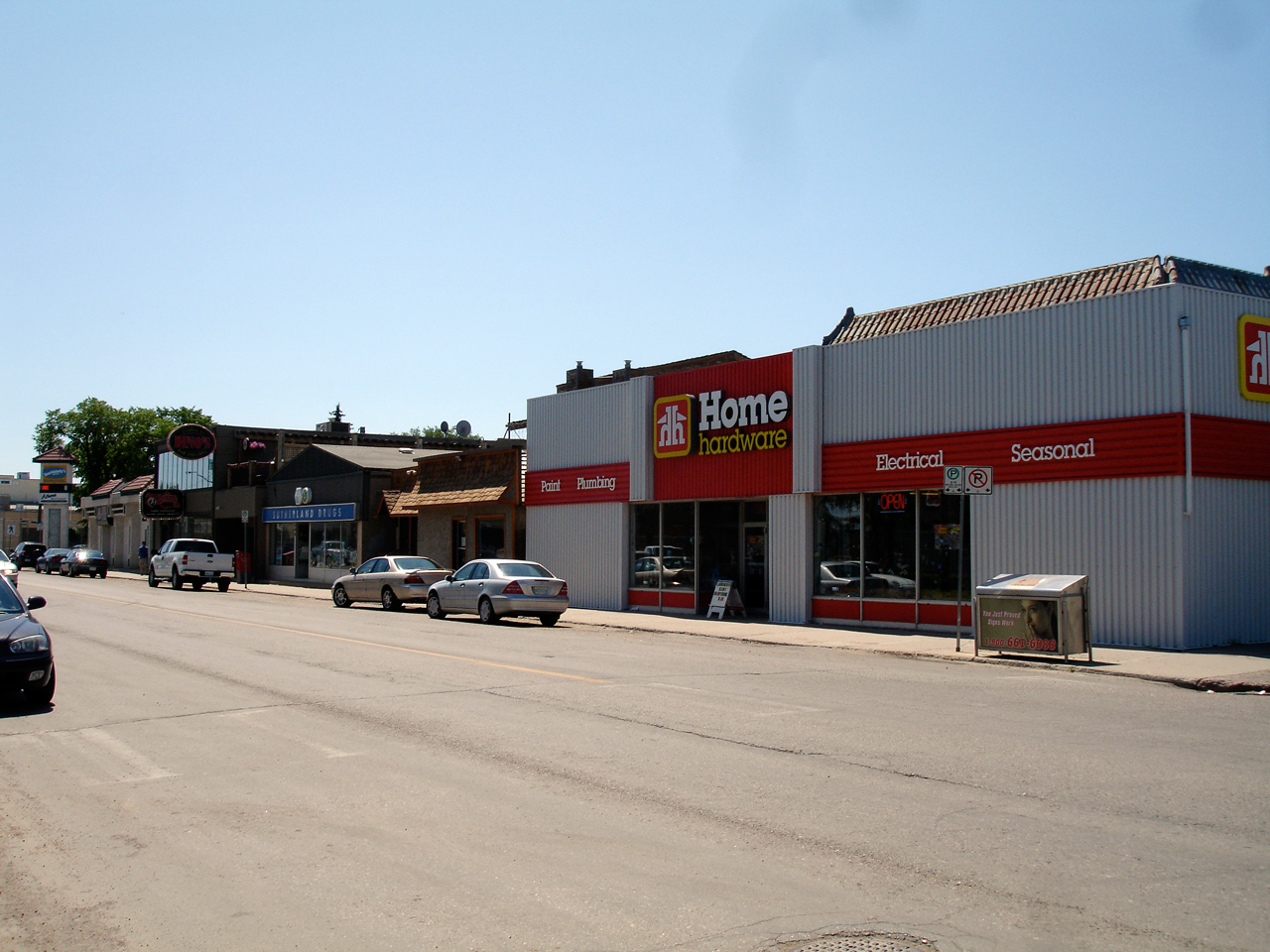
Central Avenue

Since Sutherland's founding, almost all commercial activity has been located on its main street, Central Avenue. The vast majority of businesses are found between 108th and 115th Streets. Technically, all businesses located on the east side of Central Avenue north of 108th Street actually lie within the Sutherland Industrial subdivision, but most locals do not make this distinction. There is also a large greenhouse located within Sutherland, on the corner of Central Avenue and Attridge Drive. 62 home-based business exist in the area.

In the 1980s plans were announced for the construction of a Real Canadian Superstore big-box grocery retailer on a remnant piece of former University of Saskatchewan land "orphaned" by the construction of the northeast leg of Circle Drive. Protests from area residents resulted in the plan being dropped; the grocery store was instead built on 8th Street East, and as of 2022 official city maps show the remnant land as earmarked for "future residential" though no time frame for development has as yet been announced.

Newer commercial development in the nearby University Heights Suburban Centre neighbourhood and Preston Crossing big-box complex caused a dramatic increase in Sutherland's commercial vacancy rate in the mid-2000s. In 2007, Saskatoon's city council held off further commercial development in the northeast, to halt a further decline in the business district.

== Notable people ==
- Jack Hamilton (1886–1976), Mayor of Sutherland in 1916, inductee into Canada's Sports Hall of Fame and the Canadian Olympic Hall of Fame
- David Vivian Currie (1912–1986), Canadian recipient of the Victoria Cross
- John Prebble (1915–2001), English journalist, novelist, documentarian and historian
- Chuck Rayner (1920–2002), Canadian professional goaltender and Hockey Hall of Fame inductee

== Location ==
Sutherland is located within the University Heights Suburban Development Area. It is bounded by Attridge Drive to the north, College Drive to the south, Central Avenue to the east, and Circle Drive to the west. In addition, Sutherland includes a small section of residential development east of Central Avenue (including multi-family dwellings on Central Place) that otherwise would be part of Sutherland Industrial.
