= Forest Grove, Saskatoon =

Forest Grove
- Neighbourhood
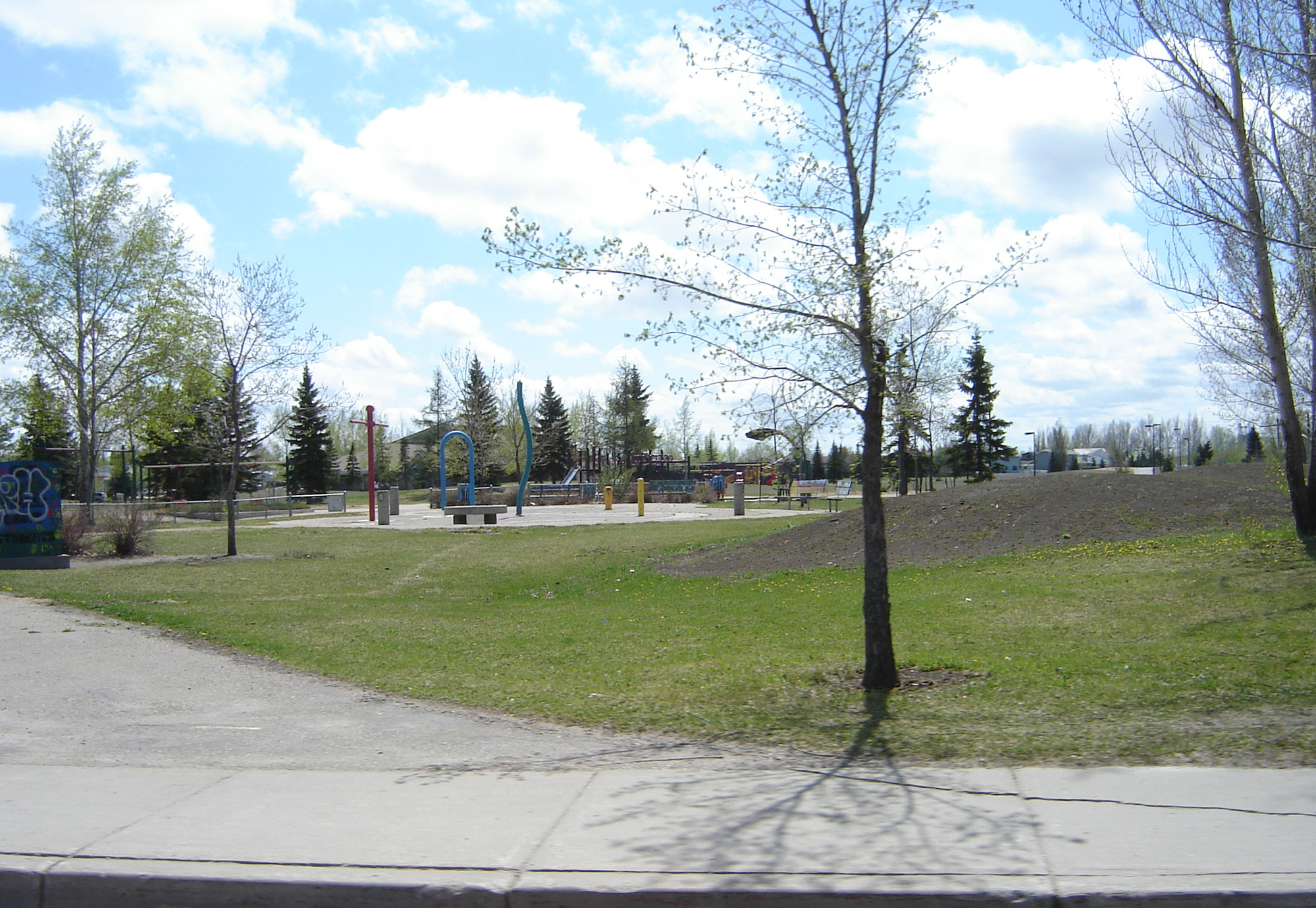
- Les Kerr Park

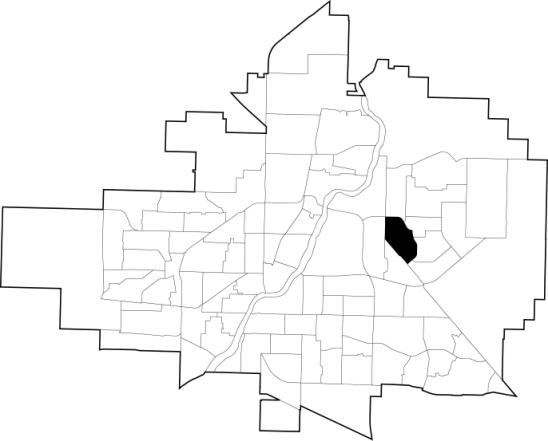
- Forest Grove location map
- Coordinates: 52°8′34″N 106°35′21″W
- Country: Canada
- Province: Saskatchewan
- City: Saskatoon
- Suburban Development Area: University Heights
- Neighbourhood: Forest Grove
- Annexed: 1955-1959
- Construction: 1971-1990

Government
  - Type: Municipal (Ward 1)
  - Administrative body: Saskatoon City Council
  - Councillor: Darren Hill

Area
  - Total: 1.61 km^{2} (0.62 sq mi)

Population (2011)
  - Total: 5,907
  - Average Income: $70,487
- Time zone: UTC-6 (UTC)
- Website: www.sutherlandforestgrove.ca

Forest Grove is a primarily residential neighbourhood located in northeast Saskatoon, Saskatchewan, Canada. It is mostly made up of low-density single detached dwellings, with a sizeable minority of multiple-unit apartment dwellings. As of 2011, the area is home to 5,907 residents. The neighbourhood is considered a middle-income area, with an average family income of $70,487, an average dwelling value of $246,680 and a home ownership rate of 62.4%.

== History ==
Forest Grove began to develop in the 1960s and its boundaries were originally set as 115th Street to the south, Forest Drive to the east, Central Avenue to the west, and undeveloped land to the north. This was the case well into the 1980s until Forest Grove was expanded to the north, with additional residential along Rossmo Road added and the boundaries extended to reach the new Attridge Drive arterial road. Also in the 1980s, new residential development south of 115th Street, east of what was then Nelson Avenue, and west of Berini Drive also occurred, and this was also considered part of Forest Grove.

Present-day Forest Grove now also includes residential land that was owned and developed by the Canadian Pacific Railway when the settlement of Sutherland was established in 1909. Originally part of Sutherland, the land along Gray (formerly Railway) Avenue and south of 115th Street was transferred to Forest Grove when the neighbourhood boundaries were redrawn in the 1990s. The remaining land on which Forest Grove now sits was annexed between 1955 and 1959, and the majority of residential construction was done between 1970 and 1990 (although the streets north of 115th Street, east of Central Avenue and south of what is now Rossmo Road were on city street maps as early as 1961). The housing stock is composed mostly of low-density, single detached houses and multiple-unit apartment buildings. Forest Grove School was opened on October 15, 1983, partially on the site of the former Sutherland Park Drive-In theatre, and St. Volodymyr School opened on March 1, 1989.

== Government and politics ==
Forest Grove exists within the federal electoral district of Saskatoon—University. It is currently represented by Corey Tochor of the Conservative Party of Canada, first elected in 2019.

Provincially, the area is within the constituency of Saskatoon Silverspring-Sutherland. It is currently represented by Paul Merriman of the Saskatchewan Party, first elected in 2011 and re-elected in 2016.

In Saskatoon's non-partisan municipal politics, Forest Grove lies within ward 1. It is currently represented by Darren Hill, first elected in 2006.

== Institutions ==
=== Education ===
École Forest Grove School
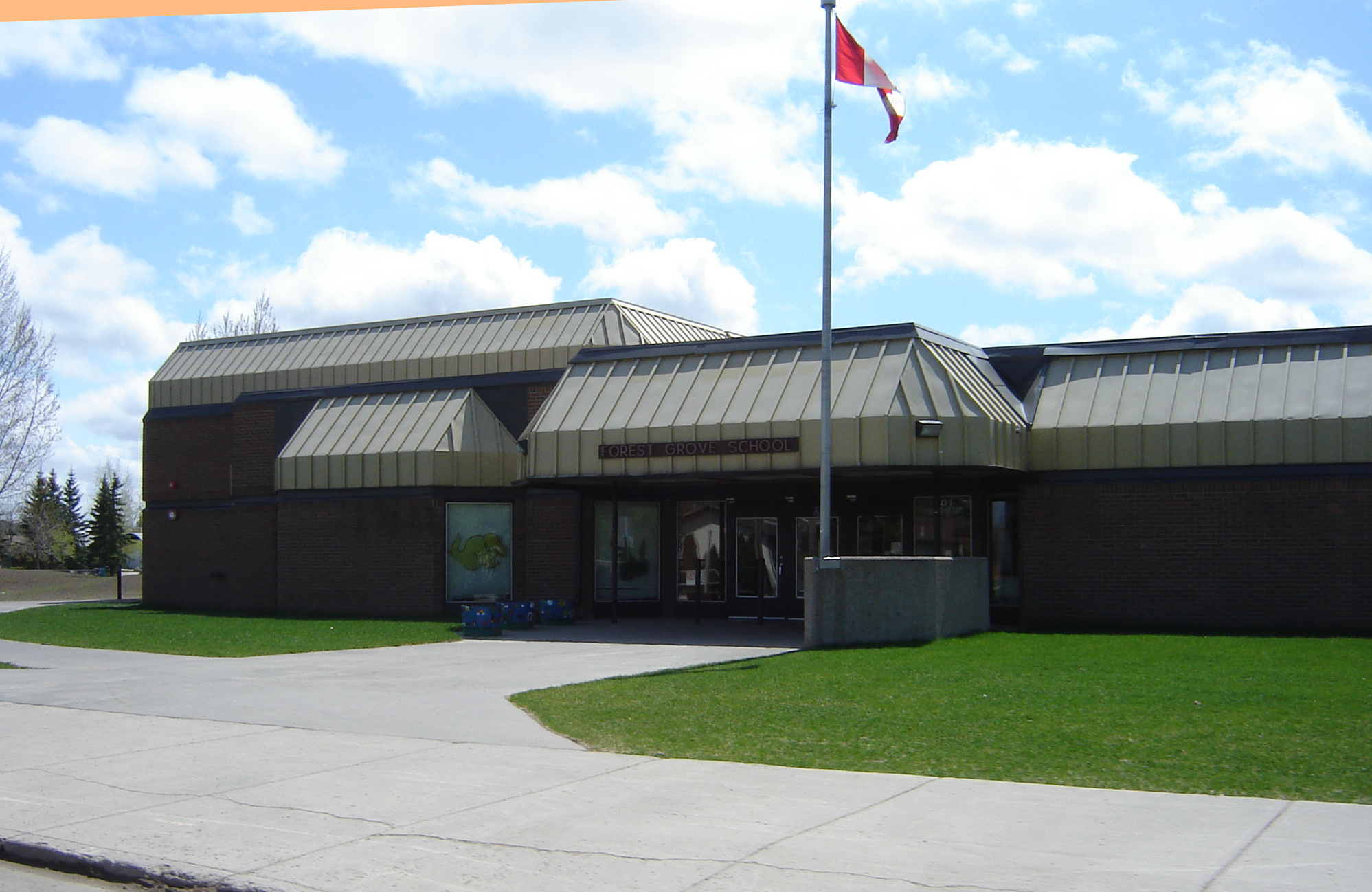

Location
- 501 - 115th Street East; Saskatoon, Saskatchewan, S7N 2X9; Canada

Information
- Type: Elementary
- Motto: Caring, Sharing & Excellence
- Opened: 1983
- School board: Saskatoon Public School Division
- Principal: Yvonne Denomy
- Grades: Kindergarten to Grade 8
- Enrollment: 526 (2017)
- Education system: Public
- Language: English, French Immersion
- Feeder to: Centennial Collegiate
- Website: École Forest Grove School

St. Volodymyr School
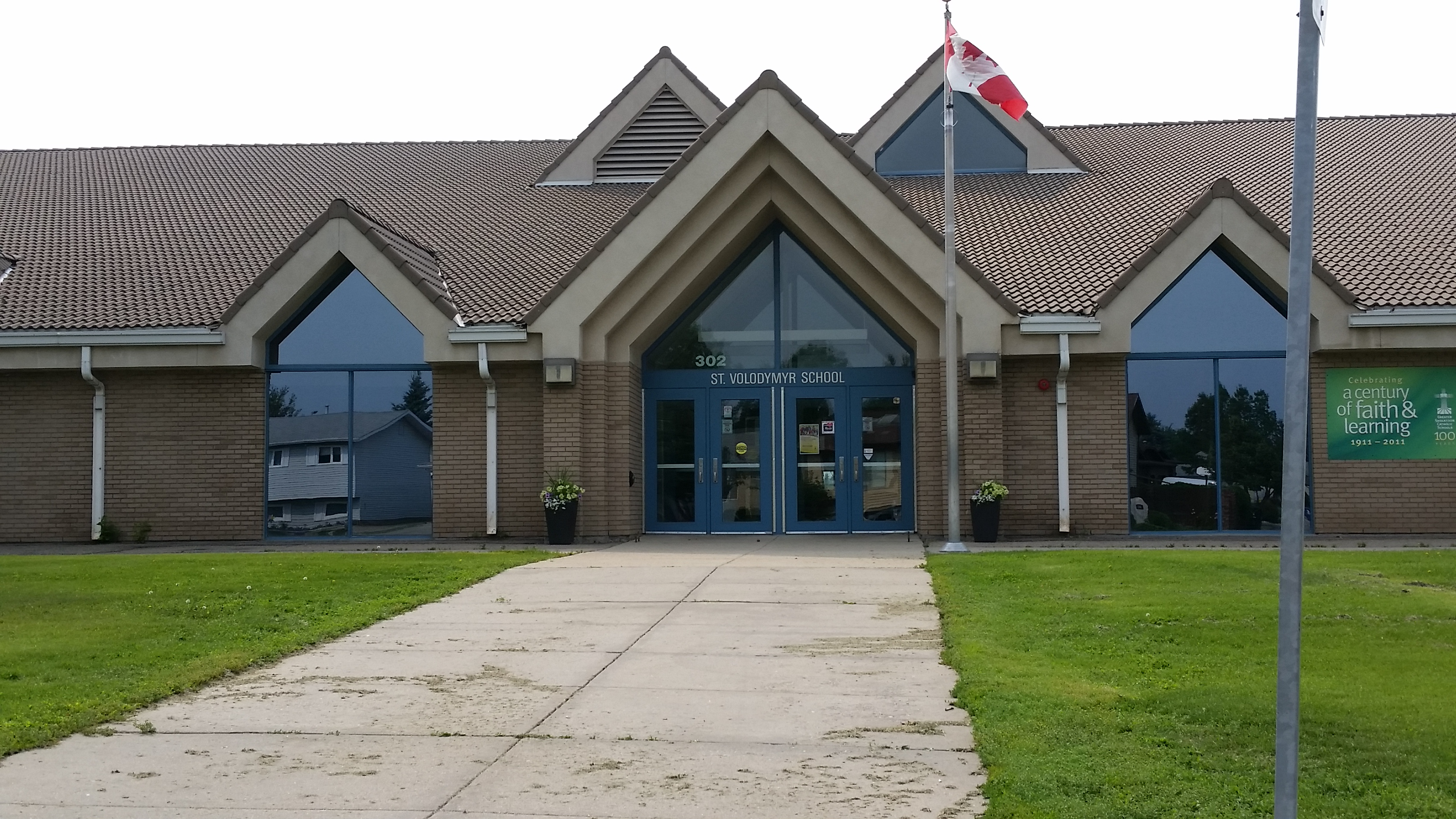

Location
- 302 Kellough Road; Saskatoon, Saskatchewan, S7N 3K6; Canada

Information
- Type: Elementary
- Religious affiliation: Catholic
- Opened: 1988
- School board: Greater Saskatoon Catholic Schools
- Principal: Shawn Lorenz
- Grades: Kindergarten to Grade 8
- Enrollment: 330 (2017)
- Education system: Separate
- Language: English
- Team name: Vanguards
- Feeder to: St. Joseph High School
- Website: St. Volodymyr School

- École Forest Grove School - public elementary, part of the Saskatoon Public School Division
- St. Volodymyr School - separate (Catholic) elementary, part of Greater Saskatoon Catholic Schools

== Parks and recreation ==
- T.J. Quigley Park - 1.1 acres (0.45 ha)
- Balsam Park - 1.5 acres (0.61 ha)
- Forest Grove Linkage - 1.8 acres (0.73 ha)
- Les Kerr Park - 17.3 acres (7.0 ha)

The Sutherland-Forest Grove Community Association was incorporated in 1984 and is run by volunteers. It plans, coordinates, and administers seasonal programs for all age groups, from adult fitness to teen programs, children's sports and toddler activities. It also works with local schools and the City to maintain and operate neighbourhood parks and outdoor rinks.

Forest Grove is also close to the Forestry Farm Park and Zoo, and in fact one of its streets, Forest Drive, used to be the access road into the park until the access was cut off in the 1980s and a new one established via Attridge Drive.

== Commercial ==
Business areas include commercial and light industrial activity along Gray Avenue, adjacent to the CP Rail tracks. At the intersection of Spruce Drive and 115th Street, there is a strip mall containing a hair salon, pizza parlor, clothing boutique and convenience store. Another freestanding commercial building can be found closer to Central Avenue. Other commercial hubs located nearby include the adjacent University Heights Suburban Centre, the core Sutherland commercial strip along Central Avenue to the southwest, and the Preston Crossing big-box development to the west.

Former commercial development in the area included the Sutherland Park Drive-In theatre, which operated just east of the intersection of 115th Street and Spruce Drive/Dunlop Street until it was demolished to make way for residential and school development in the early 1980s.

== Location ==
Forest Grove is located within the University Heights Suburban Development Area. It is bounded by Berini Drive to the east, Gray Avenue to the south, Central Avenue to the west, and Attridge Drive to the north. Inside those boundaries, the roads are a mix of local and collector roads.
