= St. Joseph High School (Saskatoon) =

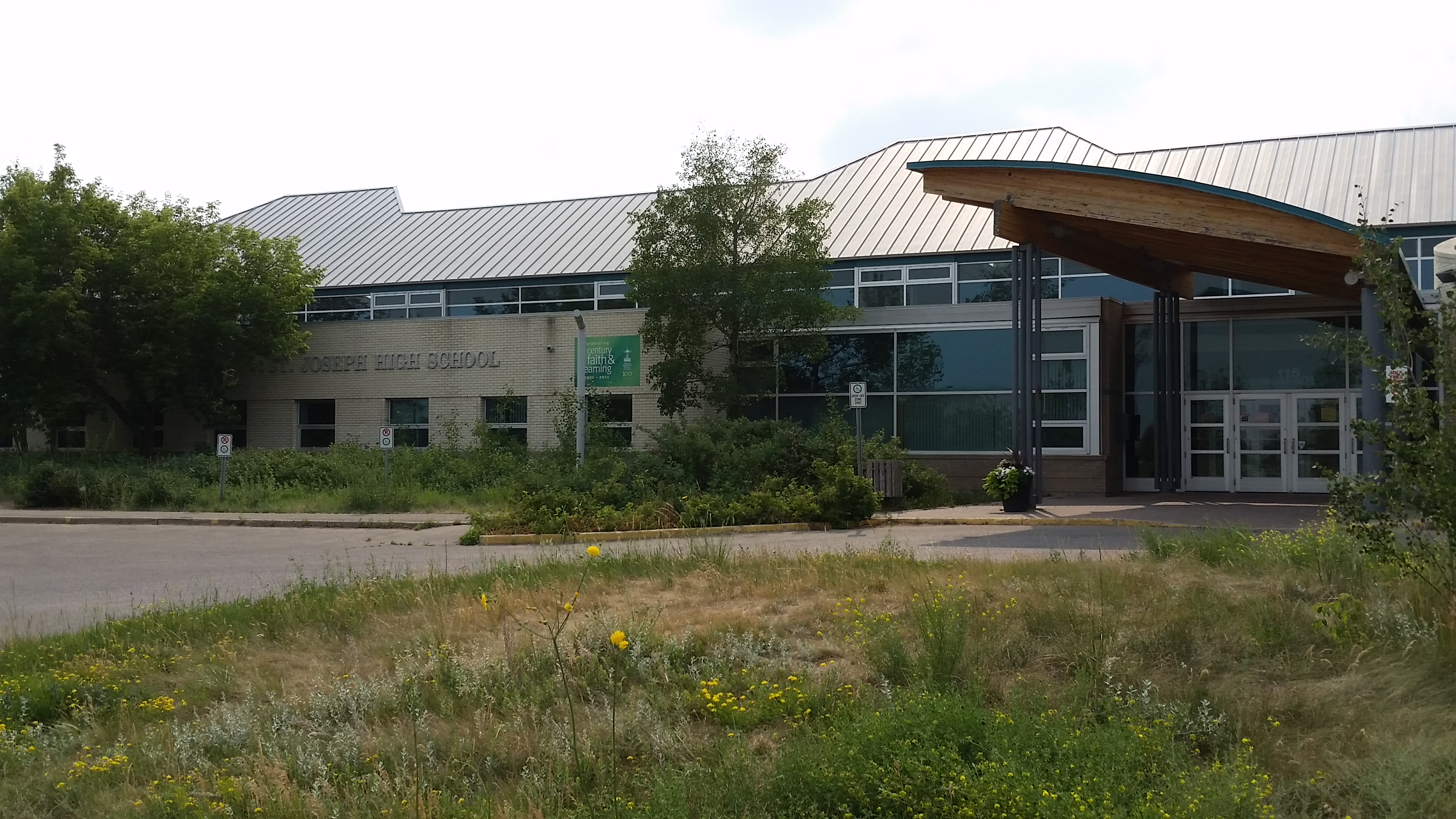

Location
- 115 Nelson Road; Saskatoon, Saskatchewan, S7S 1H1; Canada; 52.147700°N 106.583612°W

Information
- Type: Secondary
- Motto: Once a Guardian, Always a Guardian.
- Religious affiliation: Catholic
- Opened: 1995
- School board: Greater Saskatoon Catholic Schools
- Principal: Jason Benson
- Staff: 140
- Grades: 9-12
- Enrollment: 1,603 (2025)
- Education system: Separate
- Language: English, French Immersion
- Colours: Black, White and Silver
- Team name: Guardians
- Website: www.gscs.ca/jos

St. Joseph High School is a high school in Saskatoon, Canada, a part of the University Heights Suburban Centre. St. Joseph High School is part of the Greater Saskatoon Catholic School division. Opened in 1995, it currently has approximately 1600 students as of 2025. It celebrated 30 years in 2025.

Its current feeder schools are Bishop Filevich Ukrainian Bilingual School, École Cardinal Leger School, Father Robinson School, Holy Family School, Mother Teresa School, St. Augustine School, St. Nicholas School, and St. Volodymyr School.

== Sports Teams ==
St. Joseph's sports teams are governed by the Saskatoon Secondary Schools Athletic Directorate (SSSAD).

St. Joseph competes in the following sports:

Basketball	Junior Girls Junior Boys Senior Girls Senior Boys
Badminton	Junior Team Senior Team
Cross Country Running	School Team
Curling	Girls Team Boys Team Mixed Team
Football	Junior Team Senior Team
Soccer	Girls Team Boys Team
Track & Field	School Team
Volleyball	Junior Girls Junior Boys Senior Girls Senior Boys
Wrestling	Girls Team Boys Team

== Clubs ==
Social Activities

ACT (All Coming Together)

Debate Club

Chess Club

Social Action Group

Green Guardians

Best Buddies

Band

Junior Jazz

Senior Jazz

Band Concert

Choral

Grade 9-12 Concert Choir

Chamber Choir

Jazz Band

Vocal Jazz

Drama

Musical Theatre

Fall Production

One Act Festival

Light & Sound

Promotions

Make-up

Sets & Stage

Variety Night

Other

International Travel

Outdoor Education Club

Rosary Club

Student Representative Council

Soul Seekers

Yearbook

Driver Education

== Notable alumni ==
- Colby Armstrong — former NHL forward, hockey analyst for Rogers Sportsnet
- Riley Armstrong — former NHL forward
- Eric Gryba — former NHL defenceman
- Daniel Okpoko – CFL defensive tackle for the Ottawa Redblacks
- Brayden Schenn — NHL forward for the St. Louis Blues, 1 time Stanley Cup Champion (2019)
- Luke Schenn — NHL defenceman for the Winnipeg Jets, 2 time Stanley Cup Champion (2020, 2021)
- Jarret Stoll — former NHL forward, 2 time Stanley Cup Champion (2012,2014)
- Brett Boyko — professional football offensive lineman for the Edmonton Elks of the Canadian Football League (CFL). He has also been a member of the Philadelphia Eagles and San Diego / Los Angeles Chargers of the National Football League (NFL), San Diego Fleet of the Alliance of American Football (AAF), BC Lions and Saskatchewan Roughriders of the CFL, and Orlando Guardians of the XFL. He played college football for the UNLV Rebels.[1]
- Jorgen Hus — former Seattle Seahawks longsnapper
