= David Vivian Currie =

Canadian military officer, recipient of the Victoria Cross

David Vivian Currie VC CD
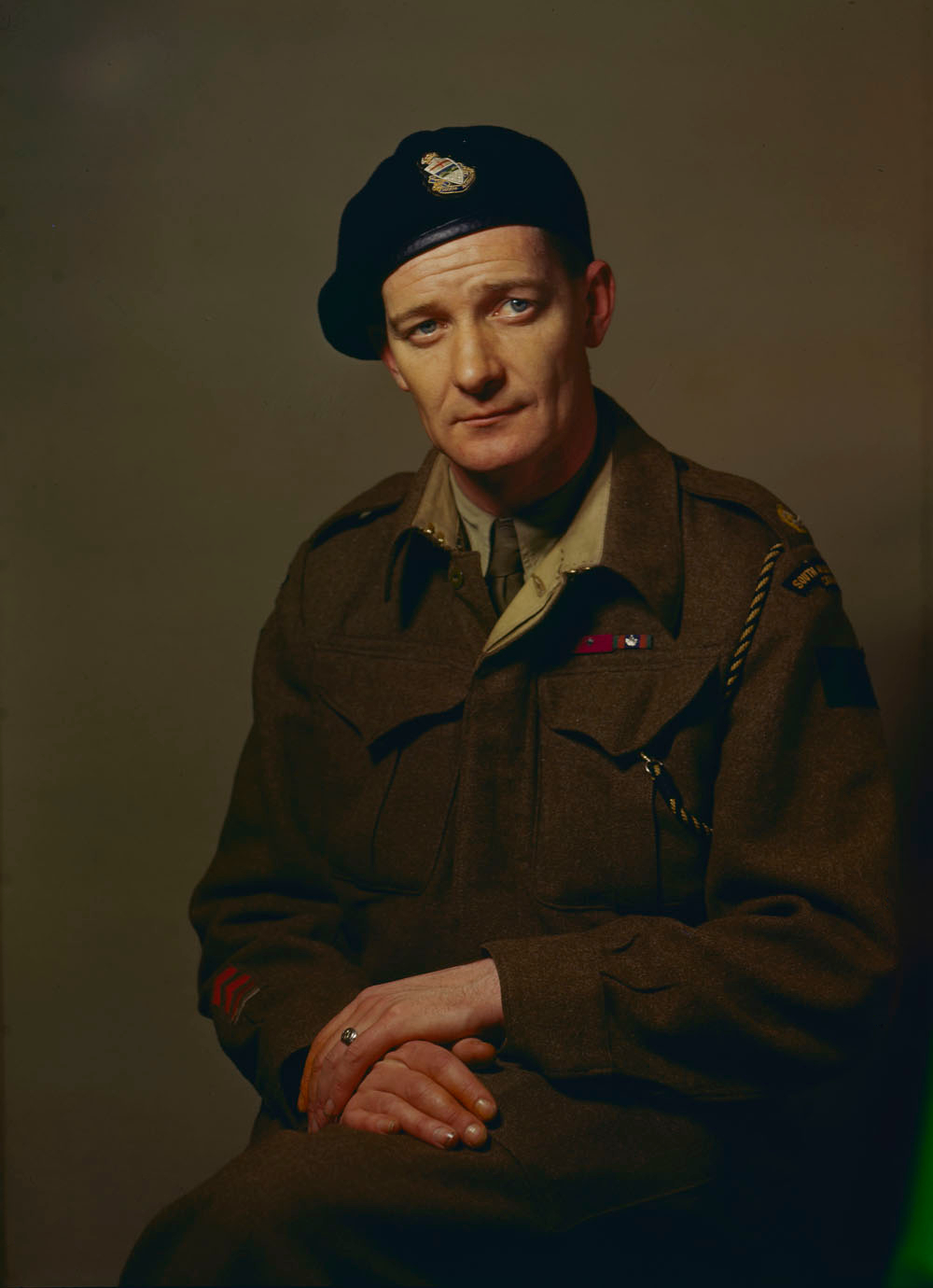
- Born: 8 July 1912; Sutherland, Saskatchewan, Canada
- Died: 24 June 1986 (aged 73); Ottawa, Ontario, Canada
- Burial place: Greenwood Cemetery, Owen Sound, Ontario
- Military career
- Allegiance: Canada
- Branch: Canadian Army
- Service years: 1939–1945
- Rank: Lieutenant Colonel
- Unit: The South Alberta Regiment
- Conflicts: World War II
- Awards: Victoria Cross

David Vivian Currie, VC CD (8 July 1912 – 24 June 1986) was a Canadian recipient of the Victoria Cross, the highest award for gallantry in the face of the enemy that can be awarded to British and Commonwealth forces.

== Early life ==
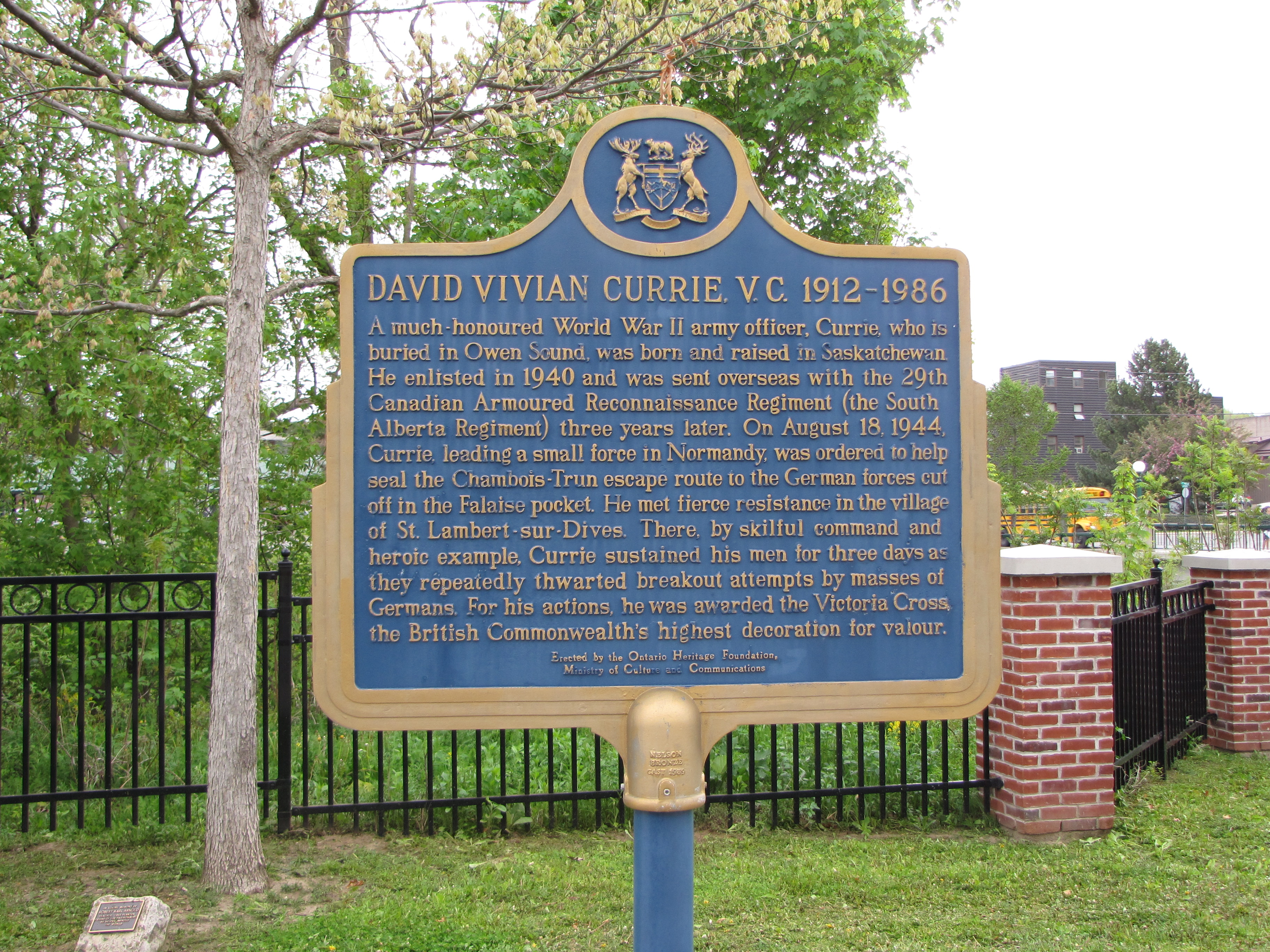
David Currie plaque

Currie was born in Sutherland, Saskatchewan, the only son and eldest child of David Henry Currie and his wife Mable Brimble. The elder Currie worked as an engineer for the Canadian Pacific Railroad. From 1913 to 1939 the family lived in Moose Jaw, Saskatchewan. D.V. Currie was educated at King George Public School, the Central Collegiate and Moose Jaw Technical School. He was trained as an automobile mechanic and welder.

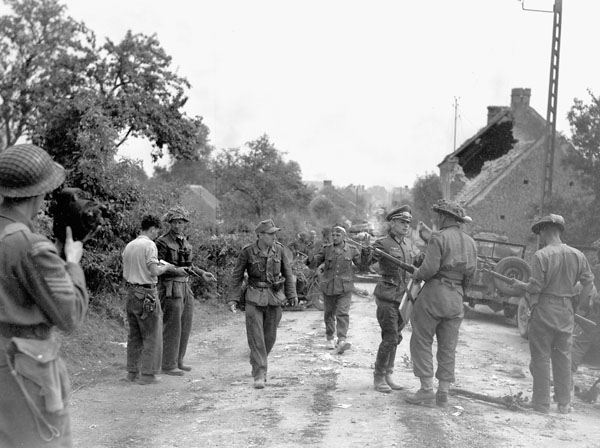
Currie (left of centre, holding a revolver) accepting the surrender of German troops at St. Lambert-sur-Dives, France, 19 August 1944. This photo captures the actions that would lead to him being awarded the Victoria Cross.

== Military service ==
In 1939 he joined the military, before joining the Regular Army the following year. He was commissioned as a lieutenant shortly afterward, before being promoted to captain in 1941. By 1944 he had reached the rank of major.

Currie was awarded the Victoria Cross for his actions in command of a battle group of tanks from The South Alberta Regiment, artillery, and infantry of the Argyll and Sutherland Highlanders of Canada at St. Lambert-sur-Dives in France, during the final actions to close the Falaise Gap. This was the only Victoria Cross awarded to a Canadian soldier during the Normandy campaign (6 June 1944 through to the end of August 1944), and the only VC ever awarded to a member of the Royal Canadian Armoured Corps.

The then 32-year-old Currie was a Major in The South Alberta Regiment, Canadian Army during the Second World War. During the Battle of Falaise, Normandy, between 18–20 August 1944, Currie was in command of a small mixed force of tanks, self-propelled anti-tank guns, and infantry which had been ordered to cut off one of the Germans' main escape routes.

After Currie led the attack on the village of St. Lambert-sur-Dives and consolidated a position halfway inside it, his force repulsed repeated enemy attacks over the next day and a half. Despite heavy casualties, Major Currie's small force destroyed seven enemy tanks, twelve 88 mm guns, and 40 vehicles, which led to the deaths of 300 German soldiers, 500 wounded, and 2,100 captured. The remnants of two German armies were denied an escape route.

On August 19, cameraman Jack Stollery filmed David Currie as the latter was overseeing the surrender of a group of German soldiers. This makes David Currie the only Victoria Cross recipient to have their action caught on film.

Currie would continue to serve on the frontline, taking part in securing the Channel ports and the Scheldt campaign, before being taken off the line to receive the Victoria Cross.

Currie later achieved the rank of lieutenant colonel. After his military career, he served as Sergeant at Arms in the House of Commons of Canada from 1960 to 1978. On May 18, 1966 Currie was present during the failed bomb plot by Paul Joseph Chartier. In this role, he also served as a production consultant on the politically-themed CBC Television drama series Quentin Durgens, M.P..

He and his wife Isabel remained in Ottawa after his time in the Commons and died there in 1986 and both were buried in Isabel's hometown of Owen Sound, Ontario at Greenwood Cemetery. An armory in Moose Jaw, Saskatchewan has since been named the "Lt. Colonel D.V. Currie Armoury" in his honor and Currie Avenue in the Montgomery Place neighborhood of Saskatoon was named in his honor.

== Medals ==
In August 2017, Currie's VC and other medals were presented for auction by the British company of Dix Noonan Webb. The seller had purchased them from Currie's widow in 1989, and they were being held by Canadian dealer Tanya Ursual. The sale price was £550,000 or slightly more than $916,000 Canadian dollars. Of the 16 Victoria Crosses awarded to Canadians in the Second World War, 12 were awarded to men serving in Canadian units. On 1 May 2018, the Canadian War Museum announced that it had acquired LCol. Currie's medals through a concerted effort of the Department of Canadian Heritage, as well as several honorary members of the North Saskatchewan Regiment.

== Citation ==
The following is the citation for Currie's Victoria Cross.

In Normandy on 18th August, 1944, Major Currie was in command of a small mixed force of Canadian tanks, self-propelled anti-tank guns and infantry which was ordered to cut one of the main escape routes from the Falaise pocket.

This force was held up by strong enemy resistance in the village of St. Lambert sur Dives and two tanks were knocked out by 88 mm guns. Major Currie immediately entered the village alone on foot at last light through the enemy outposts to reconnoitre the German defences and to extricate the crews of the disabled tanks, which he succeeded in doing in spite of heavy mortar fire.

Early the following morning, without any previous artillery bombardment, Major Currie personally led an attack on the village in the face of fierce opposition from enemy tanks, guns and infantry and by noon had succeeded in seizing and consolidating a position half-way inside the village.

During the next 36 hours the Germans hurled one counter-attack after another against the Canadian force but so skilfully had Major Currie organised his defensive position that these attacks were repulsed with severe casualties to the enemy after heavy fighting.

At dusk on 20th August the Germans attempted to mount a final assault on the Canadian positions, but the attacking force was routed before it could even be deployed. Seven enemy tanks, twelve 88 mm. guns and forty vehicles were destroyed, 300 Germans were killed, 500 wounded and 2,100 captured. Major Currie then promptly ordered an attack and completed the capture of the village, thus denying the Chambois-Trun escape route to the remnants of two German armies cut off in the Falaise pocket.

Throughout three days and nights of fierce fighting, Major Currie’s gallant conduct and contempt for danger set a magnificent example to all ranks of the force under his command.

On one occasion he personally directed the fire of his command tank on to a Tiger tank which had been harassing his position and succeeded in knocking it out. During another attack, while the guns of his command tank were taking on other targets of longer ranges, he used a rifle from the turret to deal with individual snipers who had infiltrated to within fifty yards of his headquarters. The only time reinforcements were able to get through to his force, he himself led the forty men forward into their positions and explained the importance of their task as a part of the defence. When, during the next attack, these new reinforcements withdrew under the intense fire brought down by the enemy, he personally collected them and led them forward into position again, where, inspired by his leadership they held for the remainder of the battle. His employment of the artillery support, which became available after his original attack went in, was typical of his cool calculation of the risks involved in every situation. At one time, despite the fact that short rounds were falling within fifteen yards of his own tank, he ordered fire from medium artillery to continue because of its devastating effect upon the attacking enemy in his immediate area.

Throughout the operation the casualties to Major Currie’s force were heavy. However, he never considered the possibility of failure or allowed it to enter the minds of his men. In the words of one of his non-commissioned officers, ‘We knew at one stage that it was going to be a fight to a finish but he was so cool about it, it was impossible for us to get excited’. Since all the officers under his command were either killed or wounded during the action, Major Currie had virtually no respite from his duties and in fact obtained only one hour’s sleep during the entire period. Nevertheless he did not permit his fatigue to become apparent to his troops and throughout the action took every opportunity to visit weapon pits and other defensive posts to talk to his men, to advise them as to the best use of their weapons and to cheer them with words of encouragement. When his force was finally relieved and he was satisfied that the turnover was complete he fell asleep on his feet and collapsed.

There can be no doubt that the success of the attack on and stand against the enemy at St. Lambert sur Dives can largely be attributed to this officer’s coolness, inspired leadership and skilful use of the limited weapons at his disposal.

The courage and devotion to duty shown by Major Currie during a prolonged period of heavy fighting were outstanding and had a far-reaching effect on the successful outcome of the battle.

— London Gazette, no.36812, 27 November 1944
