= Luke Schenn =

Canadian ice hockey player (born 1989)

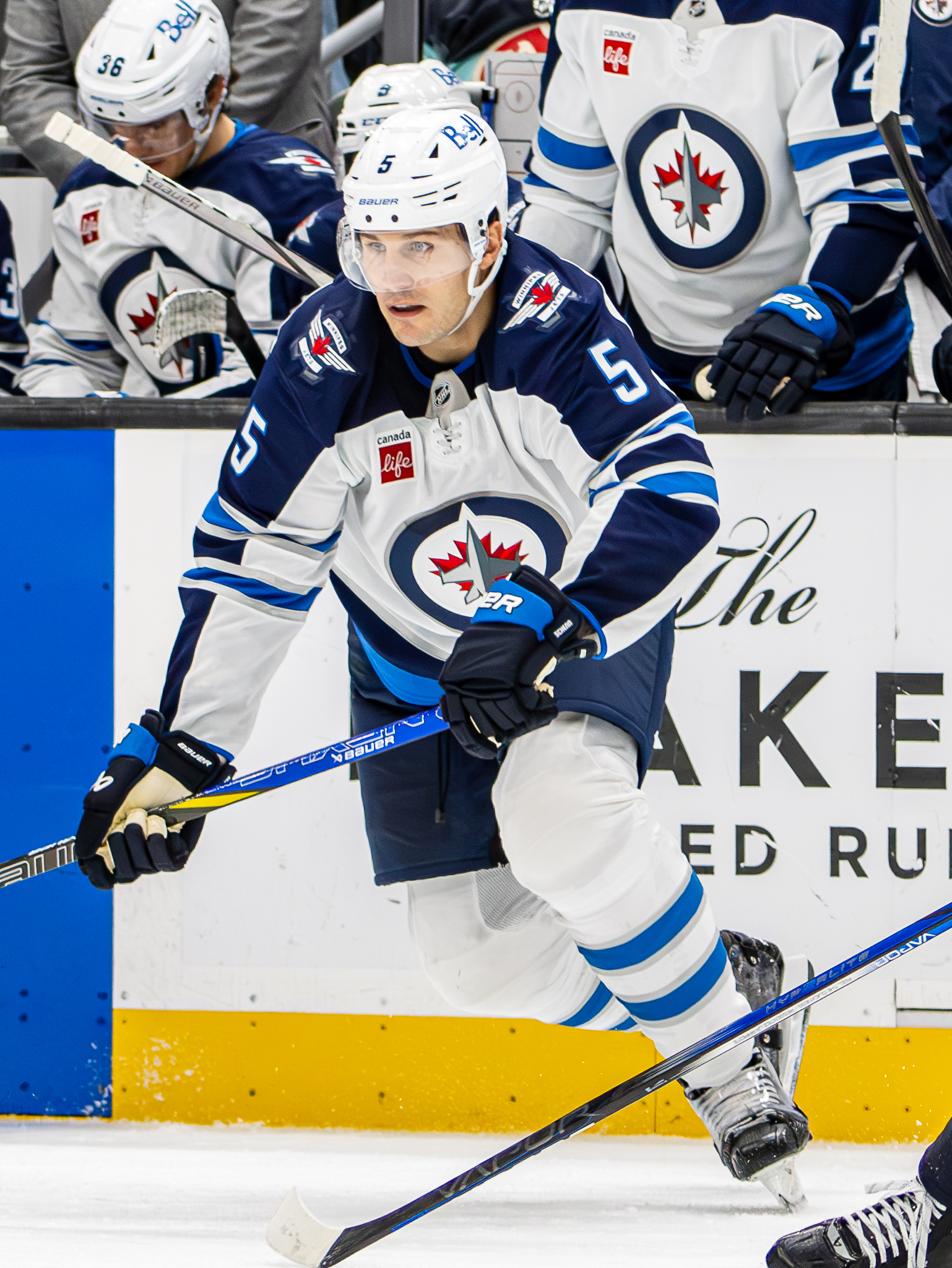
- Schenn with the Winnipeg Jets in 2025
- Born: November 2, 1989 (age 37) Saskatoon, Saskatchewan, Canada
- Height: 6 ft 2 in (188 cm)
- Weight: 229 lb (104 kg; 16 st 5 lb)
- Position: Defence
- Shoots: Right
- NHL team Former teams: Vancouver Canucks; Toronto Maple Leafs; Philadelphia Flyers; Los Angeles Kings; Arizona Coyotes; Anaheim Ducks; Tampa Bay Lightning; Nashville Predators; Winnipeg Jets; Buffalo Sabres
- National team: Canada
- NHL draft: 5th overall, 2008; Toronto Maple Leafs
- Playing career: 2008–present

Luke Schenn (born November 2, 1989) is a Canadian professional ice hockey player who is a defenceman for the Vancouver Canucks of the National Hockey League (NHL). Schenn played junior hockey with the Kelowna Rockets of the Western Hockey League (WHL). In his final WHL season, Schenn was named to the League's Second All-Star Team. He was a highly touted prospect heading into the 2008 NHL entry draft, where he was selected in the first round, fifth overall, by the Toronto Maple Leafs.

Schenn began his professional career in the NHL during the 2008–09 season and played with the Maple Leafs until being traded to Philadelphia following the 2011–12 season. After his rookie season, Schenn's play was recognized when he was named to the NHL's All-Rookie Team. Schenn won back-to-back Stanley Cups with the Tampa Bay Lightning in 2020 and 2021. He has represented Canada internationally, winning a gold medal at the 2008 World Junior Ice Hockey Championships and a silver medal at the 2009 World Ice Hockey Championships.

Schenn is a stay-at-home defenceman whose main focus is preventing goals rather than scoring. With a physical style of play, he is usually among NHL leaders in hits and is the NHL's all-time record holder for most hits by a defenceman. When he played in Toronto his charity "Luke's Troops" helped military families attend Maple Leafs home games. His younger brother Brayden was also drafted fifth overall in 2009, and was traded to the New York Islanders in March 2026.

== Playing career ==
=== Minor ===
Schenn's first minor hockey team was the Saskatoon Red Wings, where he was coached by his father, Jeff. In 2004–05, Schenn played AAA midget hockey for the Saskatoon Contacts, who won the Telus Cup as Canada's national midget hockey champions. While playing with the Contacts, Schenn was selected in the first round, 20th overall, of the 2004 Western Hockey League (WHL) bantam draft by the Kelowna Rockets.

=== Junior ===
The Kelowna Rockets arranged for Schenn to join the team during their Memorial Cup run at the end of the 2004–05 season. He roomed with defenceman Shea Weber as the team wanted him to learn about his future role. Schenn debuted with the Rockets during the 2005–06 season, and was named the team's Rookie of the Year. He served as an alternate captain for the team during the 2007–08 season. Later in that same season, Schenn was named to the WHL's roster for the ADT Canada-Russia Challenge and participated in the annual Canadian Hockey League Top Prospects Game, where he served as a team captain and scored a goal. While playing in Kelowna, he was often paired with current Dallas Stars defenceman Tyler Myers, former winner of the NHL's Calder Memorial Trophy. Schenn was named to the WHL's Second All-Star Team after the 2007–08 season.

Leading up to the 2008 NHL entry draft, Schenn was a highly regarded prospect, ranked fifth among draft-eligible North American skaters by the NHL Central Scouting Bureau. Some scouts saw him as a mix between Calder Trophy and Norris Trophy nominee Dion Phaneuf and two-time Stanley Cup champion Adam Foote. E. J. McGuire, then-director of the Central Scouting Bureau, compared him to former first overall selection Ed Jovanovski. At the draft, the Toronto Maple Leafs traded with the New York Islanders for a higher draft pick, which they ultimately used to select Schenn.

=== Professional ===
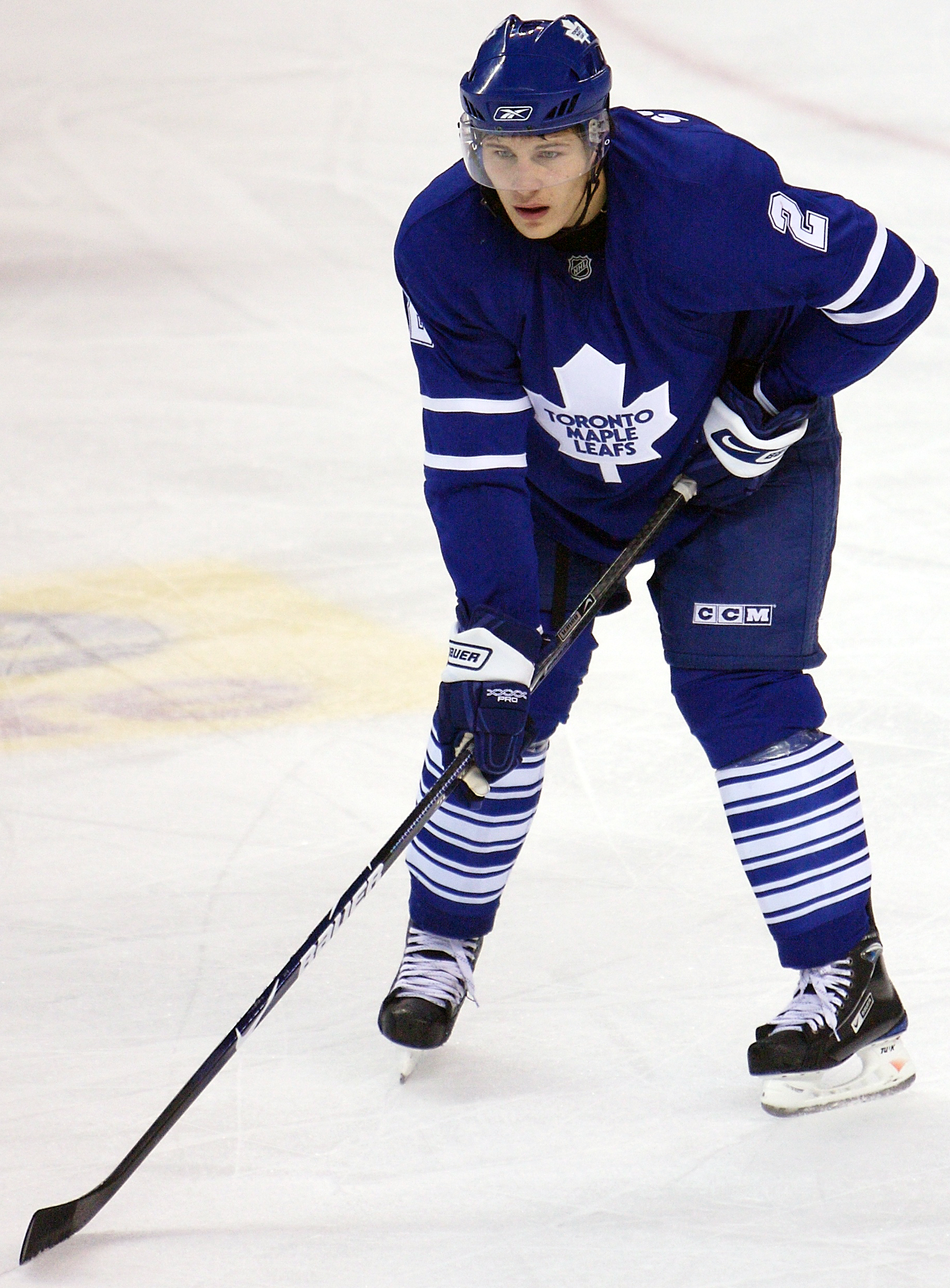
Schenn during his rookie season with the Maple Leafs

Early reports from the Maple Leafs training camp in September 2008 indicated Schenn was likely to be returned to his junior club for the 2008–09 season. On October 7, 2008, he signed a contract with the Maple Leafs with a base salary of $850,000 per season and performance bonuses that could raise the value as high as $1.25 million per season. After training camp, Schenn was chosen for the team roster at the start of the 2008–09 season, making his NHL debut on October 9 against the Detroit Red Wings. On October 29, Schenn recorded an assist for his first career NHL point against the New Jersey Devils. Later in the season, he scored his first goal against Montreal Canadiens goaltender Carey Price. In January 2009, Schenn missed 12 games with a lower-body injury, the only games he missed during his rookie season. Schenn played for the Rookie YoungStars team in the 2008–09 NHL YoungStars Game. On March 14, 2009, he recorded his first multi-point (two assists) game in an 8–6 win against the Calgary Flames. The NHL named Schenn to the 2008–09 All-Rookie Team on June 18, 2009, along with fellow 2008 draftee Drew Doughty. The award acknowledged Schenn's defensive prowess and physical play, as he led all NHL rookies in blocked shots and all rookie defencemen in hits. Schenn finished his first season in the NHL with two goals and 12 assists in 70 games played.

Expectations for Schenn were high heading into the 2009–10 season. During training camp, Toronto Head Coach Ron Wilson named him as one of the team's top four defencemen. However, as the season progressed, Schenn's play was disappointing, and Wilson kept him out of the line-up for a game in October and again for a three-game stretch in December. Towards the end of the season, Schenn and some of his younger teammates improved their play. In a game against the Ottawa Senators, Schenn posted his first career two-goal game, helping him finish the season with new career-highs in goals (5) and points (17) in 79 games played.

Schenn had a strong start to the 2010–11 season, playing with veteran Tomáš Kaberle. Prior to a game against the Philadelphia Flyers, Wilson described Schenn's play as "great". When Kaberle was traded to the Boston Bruins in February 2011, Schenn was briefly named an alternate captain in his place, until Colby Armstrong returned to the line-up after an injury. Wilson felt that Schenn had made significant strides in his third NHL season: "He's learned a lot...He's not on the ice for as many goals against any more." At the end of the season, Schenn had tied his career-high for goals with five and set new personal records for assists (17) and total points (22) while playing in all 82 games for the Maple Leafs.

On June 23, 2012, Schenn was traded to the Philadelphia Flyers in exchange for James van Riemsdyk. With the Flyers, Schenn was given the opportunity to play alongside his younger brother Brayden, saying, "It's going to be exciting to play with my brother, that's for sure. I can't describe how cool this is." On June 28, 2012, it was announced that Schenn was going to wear number 22 for the Flyers, as his usual number 2 was retired from the team in honour of defenceman Mark Howe.

During the 2015–16 season, Schenn appeared in 29 games for 5 points before he was traded (alongside Vincent Lecavalier) to the Los Angeles Kings in exchange for a third-round pick in 2016 and prospect Jordan Weal on January 6, 2016. On July 23, 2016, Schenn signed a two-year, $2.5 million deal with the Arizona Coyotes. On July 1, 2018, following the conclusion of his contract with the Coyotes, Schenn left the club as a free agent and agreed to a one-year, $800,000 contract with the Anaheim Ducks.

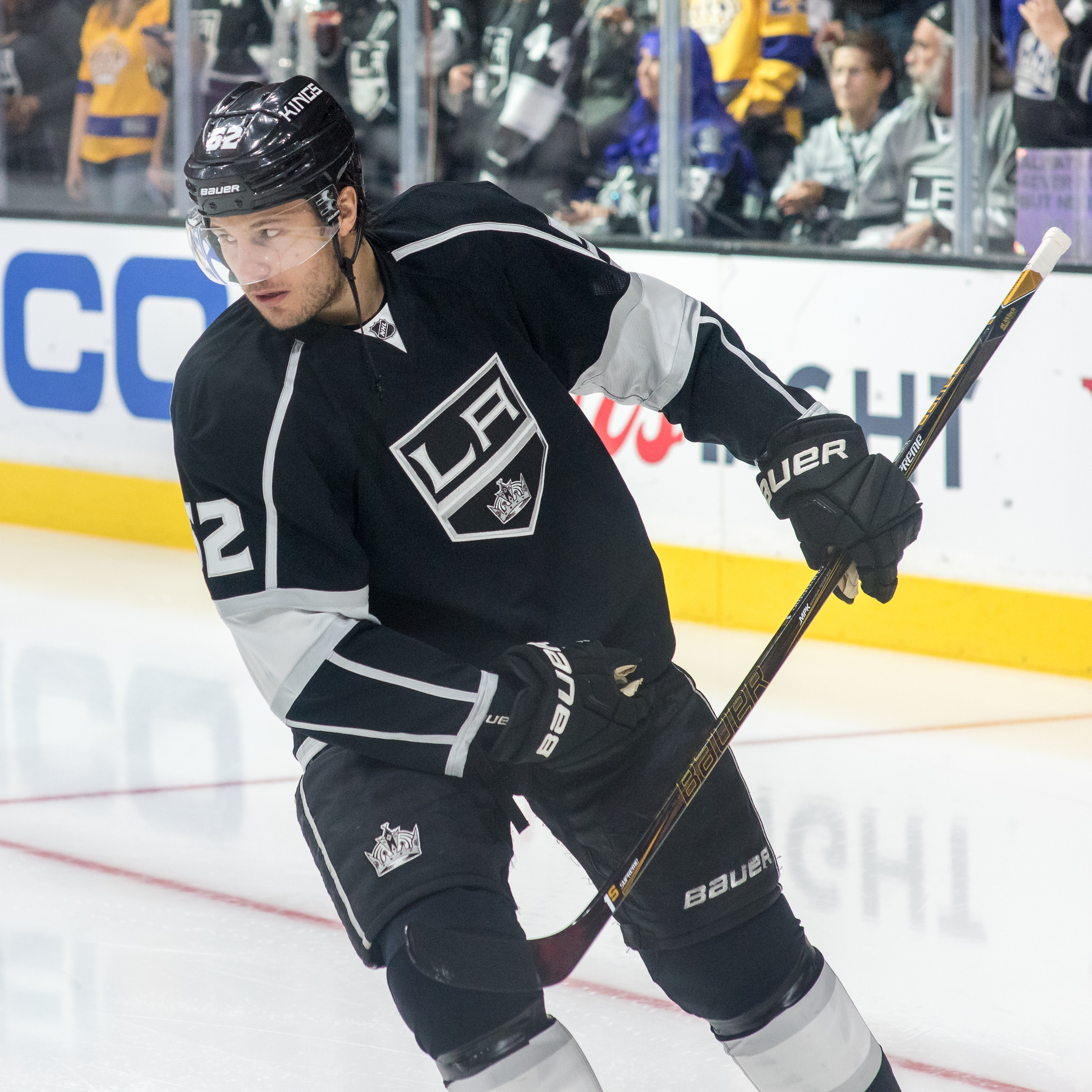
Schenn with the Los Angeles Kings in 2016

On November 17, 2018, Schenn was placed on waivers by the Ducks after playing in eight games during the 2018–19 season but recording no points. Assigned to American Hockey League (AHL) for the first time in his career, Schenn joined the Ducks' affiliate, the San Diego Gulls, and contributed with 10 points in 22 games before he was traded (along with a seventh-round pick in 2020) to the Vancouver Canucks in exchange for Michael Del Zotto on January 16, 2019. He was immediately assigned to continue in the AHL, joining the Canucks' affiliate, the Utica Comets.

On July 1, 2019, Schenn agreed as a free agent to a one-year, $700,000 contract with the Tampa Bay Lightning, where he has been a healthy scratch, including being placed on waivers, and being reassigned to Tampa's AHL affiliate, the Syracuse Crunch. He was a member of the 2019-2020 team who won the Stanley Cup. Following their Stanley Cup win, Schenn signed a one-year contract to remain with the Lightning on October 29, 2020.

Following a second successive Stanley Cup with the Lightning in the 2020–21 season, Schenn left Tampa Bay as a free agent and was signed to a two-year, $1.7 million contract to return to previous club, the Vancouver Canucks on July 28, 2021.

During the 2022–23 season, Schenn surpassed Brooks Orpik to become the all-time leader in hits by an NHL defenceman after executing six against the Arizona Coyotes on December 3, 2022. Providing a steady defensive influence to the Canucks blueline, Schenn also contributed to provide offense at the highest points-per-game of his career. With the Canucks well out of playoff contention and in his final season under contract, Schenn was traded on February 28, 2023, before the NHL trade deadline to his original club, the Toronto Maple Leafs, in exchange for a third-round pick in 2023.

As a free agent from the Maple Leafs in the off-season, Schenn was signed to a three-year, $8.25 million contract with the Nashville Predators on July 1, 2023. On October 17, 2024, early in the 2024–25 season, Schenn played his 1,000th NHL game; this was later commemorated by the Predators in a pregame ceremony on October 19. Several months later, on March 5, 2025, Schenn was traded to the Pittsburgh Penguins, alongside Tommy Novak, in exchange for Michael Bunting and a fourth-round draft pick. Schenn was then traded to the Winnipeg Jets in exchange for a second-round pick in the 2026 NHL entry draft and a fourth-round pick in the 2027 NHL entry draft two days later, on March 7, 2025. On January 6, 2026, Schenn scored his first goal as a Winnipeg Jet in his 1,100th NHL game, despite the Jets losing 4–3 to the Vegas Golden Knights. It was his first goal since 2024.

During the 2025–26 season, with the Jets forecasting to be out of playoff contention, on March 6, 2026, Schenn was traded to the Buffalo Sabres, alongside Logan Stanley, in exchange for Jacob Bryson, Isak Rosen, a conditional 2026 fourth-round pick, and a 2027 second-round pick. Schenn made just 4 regular season appearances for the Sabres in a depth role, however helped the Sabres return to the post-season for the first time in 14 years and played 2 post-season games.

On July 1, 2026, as a free agent from the Sabres, Schenn signed a one-year, $2.25 million contract to return to the Vancouver Canucks for the 2026–27 season.

== International play ==
Medal record

Representing Canada

Men's ice hockey

IIHF World Championship
Silver medal – second place	2009 Switzerland	

World Junior Championships
Gold medal – first place	2008 Czech Republic	

Ivan Hlinka Memorial Tournament
Gold medal – first place	2006 Czech Republic	

Schenn's first experience with Hockey Canada was as a member of Team West at the 2006 World Under-17 Hockey Challenge in Regina, Saskatchewan, where his team finished seventh. He played for Canada twice at the under-18 level: the 2006 Ivan Hlinka Memorial Tournament, where his team won gold, and the 2007 IIHF World U18 Championships, where Canada finished fourth. Schenn scored three goals during this tournament.

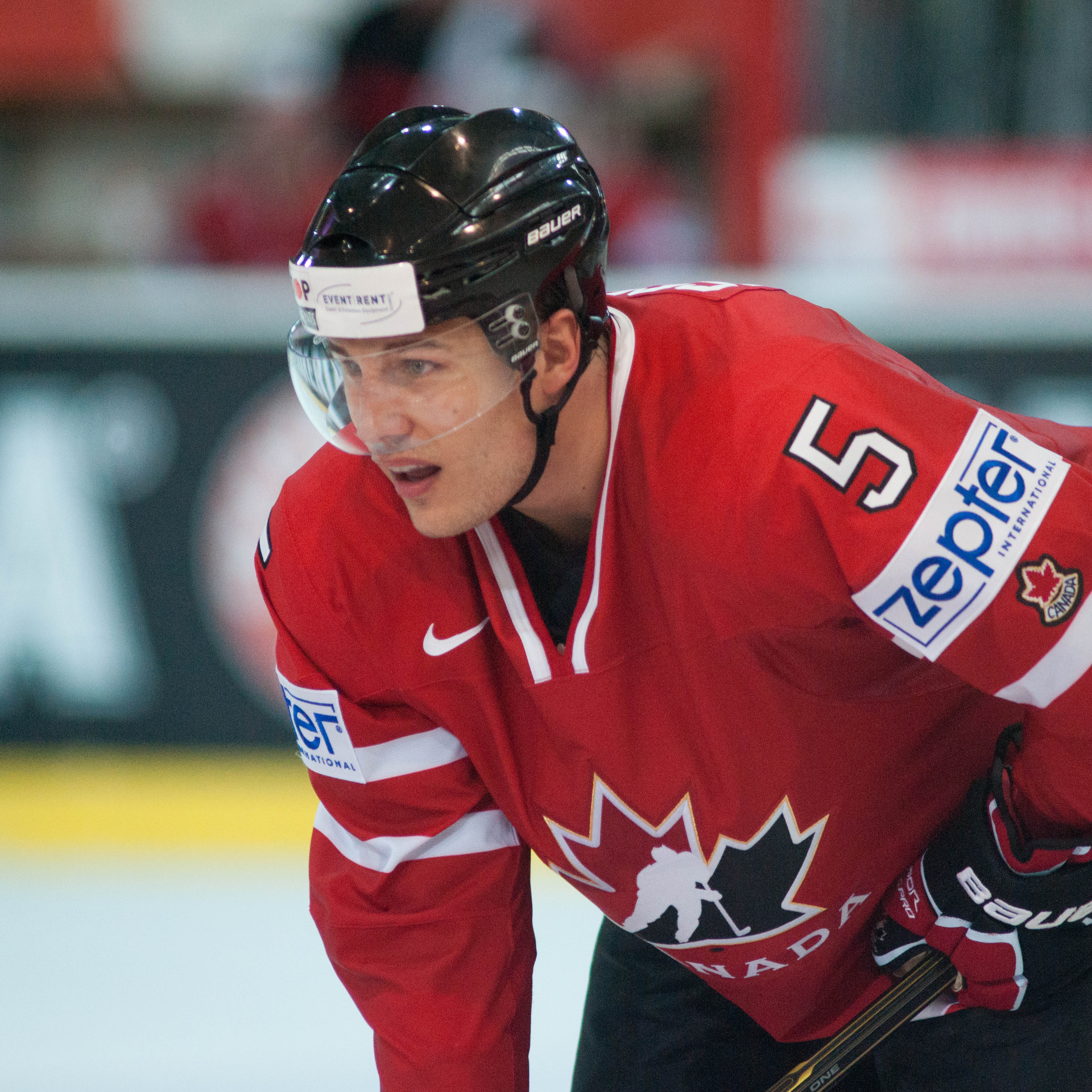
Schenn with Canada during a 2012 exhibition game

In 2007, Hockey Canada assembled a junior team to represent Canada in an eight-game series (the 2007 Super Series) against a Russian junior team to commemorate the 35th anniversary of the 1972 Summit Series. Canada went undefeated in the eight games, with seven wins and one tie, while Schenn recorded 24 penalty minutes and no points.

During the 2007–08 season, Schenn was named to Canada's selection camp roster for the 2008 World Junior Ice Hockey Championships. The final roster was named December 13, 2007, and Schenn was selected for the team, being paired with Thomas Hickey as the top defensive tandem. Canada won the gold medal and Schenn finished the tournament with a plus-minus rating of +5 to lead the team. Hockey analyst Pierre McGuire dubbed him "the human eraser" for his play internationally.

After his rookie season in the NHL, Schenn was named to the senior Canadian roster for the 2009 IIHF World Championship. He played all nine games for Canada, but did not significant ice time, averaging just under seven minutes per game. In the tournament he recorded just one assist. Canada took home the silver medal after a 2–1 loss to Russia in the gold medal game. Schenn, along with then-Toronto teammates Dion Phaneuf and James Reimer, played for Canada at the 2011 IIHF World Championship. Canada placed fifth in the tournament, with their only loss coming in the quarter-finals against Russia. In seven games, Schenn recorded a single assist.

After the 2012–13 season, Schenn was again selected by Hockey Canada to participate in the 2013 IIHF World Championship alongside Flyers teammates Matt Read, Wayne Simmonds and Flyers captain Claude Giroux. Canada was eliminated by Sweden in the quarter-finals, leaving them without a medal for the second straight year.

== Playing style ==
Schenn is a defensive defenceman who plays a physical game while attempting to prevent opponents from scoring. Since his rookie season, he has been among the NHL leaders in hits. He believes he is at his best when he is playing a tough game, while staying responsible: "You just want to be physical and play with a bit of an edge, but you don't want to put your team down short-handed." Growing up, Schenn patterned his play after fellow defencemen Chris Pronger and Rob Blake.

== Personal life ==
Schenn was born on November 2, 1989, in Saskatoon, Saskatchewan. His parents are Jeff and Rita Schenn. His younger brother Brayden was picked fifth overall in the 2009 NHL entry draft by the Los Angeles Kings, and was later traded to the Philadelphia Flyers. Schenn also has two younger sisters, Madison and Macy. Schenn graduated from St. Joseph High School in Saskatoon. His brother Brayden, along with fellow NHLers Colby Armstrong, Riley Armstrong and Jarret Stoll, also attended St. Joseph when they lived in Saskatoon.

Schenn was a key contributor to the Maple Leafs' efforts to honour Canada's military. During his rookie season, he donated $10,000 to start Luke's Troops, a charity which allows Canadian servicemen and women to attend the team's home games as Schenn's guest. Fans at the games often recognized the soldiers with applause. "They have served overseas so it's good that the fans show their appreciation," Schenn said. In February 2011, Schenn's contributions to the military were acknowledged when he was recognized during the team's annual Armed Forces night.

In 2023, Schenn was announced as a brand ambassador for Can-i Wellness oral spray supplements.

== Career statistics ==
=== Regular season and playoffs ===
			Regular season					Playoffs
Season	Team	League	GP	G	A	Pts	PIM	GP	G	A	Pts	PIM
2005–06	Kelowna Rockets	WHL	60	3	8	11	86	12	0	0	0	14
2006–07	Kelowna Rockets	WHL	72	2	27	29	139	—	—	—	—	—
2007–08	Kelowna Rockets	WHL	57	7	21	28	100	7	2	2	4	6
2008–09	Toronto Maple Leafs	NHL	70	2	12	14	71	—	—	—	—	—
2009–10	Toronto Maple Leafs	NHL	79	5	12	17	50	—	—	—	—	—
2010–11	Toronto Maple Leafs	NHL	82	5	17	22	34	—	—	—	—	—
2011–12	Toronto Maple Leafs	NHL	79	2	20	22	62	—	—	—	—	—
2012–13	Philadelphia Flyers	NHL	47	3	8	11	34	—	—	—	—	—
2013–14	Philadelphia Flyers	NHL	79	4	8	12	58	7	1	0	1	0
2014–15	Philadelphia Flyers	NHL	58	3	11	14	18	—	—	—	—	—
2015–16	Philadelphia Flyers	NHL	29	2	3	5	30	—	—	—	—	—
2015–16	Los Angeles Kings	NHL	43	2	9	11	52	5	1	1	2	6
2016–17	Arizona Coyotes	NHL	78	1	7	8	85	—	—	—	—	—
2017–18	Arizona Coyotes	NHL	64	1	6	7	35	—	—	—	—	—
2018–19	Anaheim Ducks	NHL	8	0	0	0	7	—	—	—	—	—
2018–19	San Diego Gulls	AHL	22	2	8	10	9	—	—	—	—	—
2018–19	Utica Comets	AHL	7	1	4	5	4	—	—	—	—	—
2018–19	Vancouver Canucks	NHL	18	0	2	2	9	—	—	—	—	—
2019–20	Syracuse Crunch	AHL	6	0	6	6	2	—	—	—	—	—
2019–20	Tampa Bay Lightning	NHL	25	1	2	3	23	11	0	2	2	7
2020–21	Tampa Bay Lightning	NHL	38	2	2	4	51	8	1	0	1	9
2021–22	Vancouver Canucks	NHL	66	5	12	17	61	—	—	—	—	—
2022–23	Vancouver Canucks	NHL	55	3	18	21	61	—	—	—	—	—
2022–23	Toronto Maple Leafs	NHL	15	1	0	1	13	11	0	1	1	11
2023–24	Nashville Predators	NHL	63	1	6	7	43	5	0	0	0	0
2024–25	Nashville Predators	NHL	61	1	4	5	41	—	—	—	—	—
2024–25	Winnipeg Jets	NHL	15	0	2	2	4	11	0	1	1	32
2025–26	Winnipeg Jets	NHL	46	1	6	7	32	—	—	—	—	—
2025–26	Buffalo Sabres	NHL	4	0	0	0	11	2	0	0	0	0
2026–27	Vancouver Canucks	NHL	10	0	2	2	23	—	—	—	—	—
NHL totals			1,132	45	169	214	918	60	3	5	8	65

Statistics source

=== International ===
Year	Team	Event	Result	GP	G	A	Pts	PIM
2006	Canada Western	U17	7th	5	1	0	1	10
2006	Canada	IH18	1st place, gold medalist(s)	4	0	0	0	10
2007	Canada	SS	1st place, gold medalist(s)	8	0	0	0	20
2007	Canada	WJC18	4th	6	3	0	3	4
2008	Canada	WJC	1st place, gold medalist(s)	5	0	0	0	4
2009	Canada	WC	2nd place, silver medalist(s)	9	0	1	1	0
2011	Canada	WC	5th	7	0	1	1	0
2012	Canada	WC	5th	8	0	1	1	25
2013	Canada	WC	5th	7	1	1	2	27
Junior totals				28	4	0	4	48
Senior totals				31	1	4	5	52

Statistics source

== Awards and honours ==
Award	Year
WHL
Kelowna Rockets Rookie of the Year	2006
West Second Team All-Star	2008
NHL
All-Rookie Team	2009
Stanley Cup champion	2020, 2021
Vancouver Canucks
Fred J. Hume Award	2022

Awards and achievements
Preceded by Jiří Tlustý	Toronto Maple Leafs first-round draft pick 2008	Succeeded by Nazem Kadri
