= Sutherland Industrial, Saskatoon =

Sutherland Industrial
- Neighbourhood
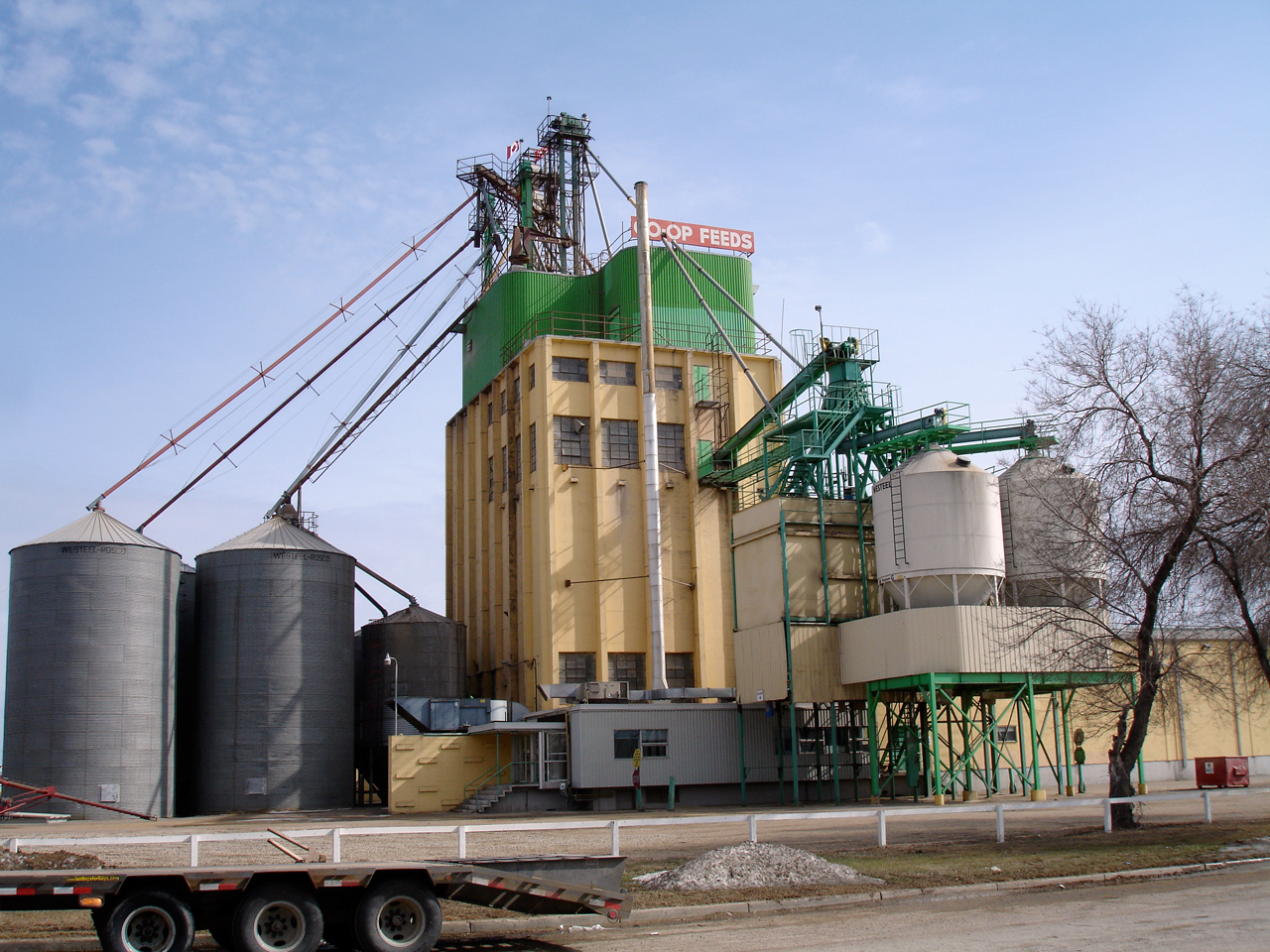
- Co-Op Feeds plant

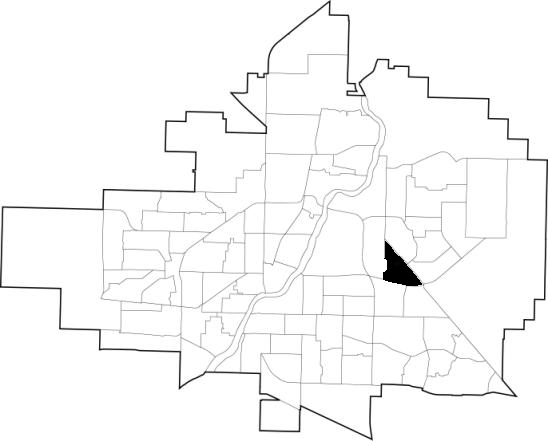
- Sutherland Industrial location map
- Coordinates: 52°7′50″N 106°35′30″W
- Country: Canada
- Province: Saskatchewan
- City: Saskatoon
- Suburban Development Area: University Heights
- Neighbourhood: Sutherland Industrial
- Settled: 1908
- Incorporated (town): 1912
- Annexed: 1956

Government
  - Type: Municipal (Ward 1)
  - Administrative body: Saskatoon City Council
  - Councillor: Darren Hill

Area
  - Total: 2.14 km^{2} (0.83 sq mi)

Population (2006)
  - Total: 10
- Time zone: UTC-6 (UTC)

Sutherland Industrial is an industrial subdivision located in east-central Saskatoon, Saskatchewan, Canada. It was originally part of Sutherland, a town outside of Saskatoon before being annexed by the city in 1956. The subdivision also contains the first urban reserve in Saskatchewan, the Muskeg Lake Cree Nation.

== History ==
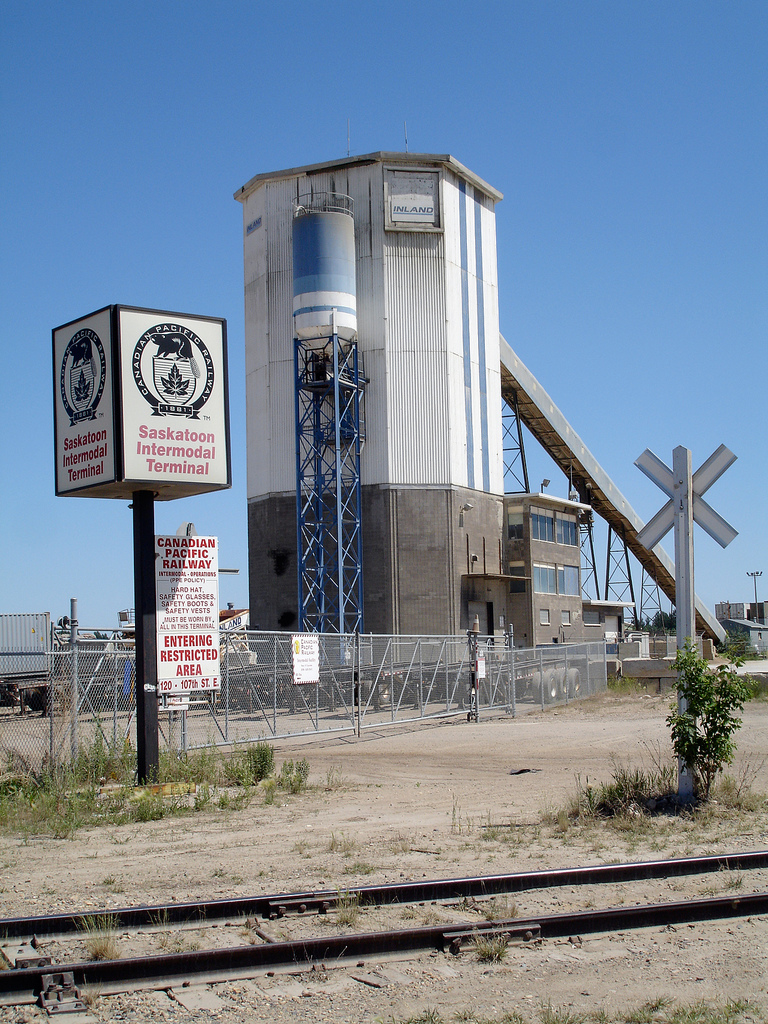
Saskatoon Intermodal Terminal

The land where Sutherland and Sutherland Industrial now sit was purchased in 1905 by Albert H. Hanson, a noted Saskatoon real estate agent. He sold part of his land to the Canadian Pacific Railway. The area was built up when the CPR branch line between Regina and Edmonton reached Saskatoon in 1907. The CPR yards and station were constructed three miles (5 km) east of Saskatoon. A settlement grew adjacent to the rail yards, and was incorporated as the village of Sutherland August 30, 1909. It was named after William Charles Sutherland, a politician who served on Saskatoon's town council before it became a city in 1906.

The triangular shape of the industrial subdivision came about as the two parts of Sutherland were developed. West of 1st (later Central) Avenue, Albert Hanson subdivided the rest of his land holdings on a north–south axis, and developed it as residential and commercial properties. On the other side of the tracks, the CPR subdivided its land following the rail axis on an angle from southeast to northwest. The resulting gap between Central Avenue and the tracks was built up as light industrial lands.

In 1956, the town was annexed by the growing city of Saskatoon. Sutherland became the city's easternmost neighbourhood until development in the 1970s took place even further east. The amalgamation required some name changes to Sutherland's streets, to avoid confusion with identically named streets already in Saskatoon (e.g. 10th Street became 110th Street). At some point after annexation, the neighbourhood boundaries were redrawn. The mainly residential portion of the former town became the neighbourhood of Sutherland, while the rail yards and associated industrial lands were split off as the Sutherland Industrial subdivision. Development of the portion of Sutherland Industrial east of Central Avenue and north of what is now College Drive began in earnest in the early 1960s.

A small chunk of Sutherland Industrial was transferred to neighbouring Sutherland with the construction of several apartment buildings on Central Place. The Sutherland Branch of the Saskatoon Public Library was located within Sutherland Industrial for many years until a new facility was developed in the University Heights Suburban Centre in the 1990s.

In 1988, the Muskeg Lake Cree Nation settled a land claim which created western Canada's first urban reserve. Title to 35 acres (140,000 m^{2}) of land in the southeast part of Sutherland Industrial was transferred to the band. Under an agreement with the City of Saskatoon, the band does not pay civic taxes, but collects its own levy and pays the city for services. The development of the reserve is also in accordance with laws of Saskatchewan and the bylaws of Saskatoon.

Road improvements over the years included the addition of a southern access via McKercher Drive, which was extended into Sutherland Industrial following the construction of an interchange with College Drive in the early 1980s. Future development plans published by the City of Saskatoon since the 1980s indicate that McKercher Drive is to eventually be extended north into Erindale, providing an additional access point into the industrial area.

== Government and politics ==
Sutherland exists within the federal electoral district of Saskatoon—University. It is currently represented by Corey Tochor of the Conservative Party of Canada, who was first elected in 2019.

Provincially, the area is within the constituency of Saskatoon Silverspring-Sutherland. It is currently represented by Paul Merriman of the Saskatchewan Party, first elected in 2011 and re-elected in 2016.

In Saskatoon's non-partisan municipal politics, Sutherland lies within ward 1. It is currently represented by Darren Hill, first elected in 2006.

The eastern portion of Sutherland Industrial - specifically that portion east of Packham Avenue and straddling the northern extension of McKercher Drive - is considered part of the Muskeg Lake Cree Nation.

== Industrial ==
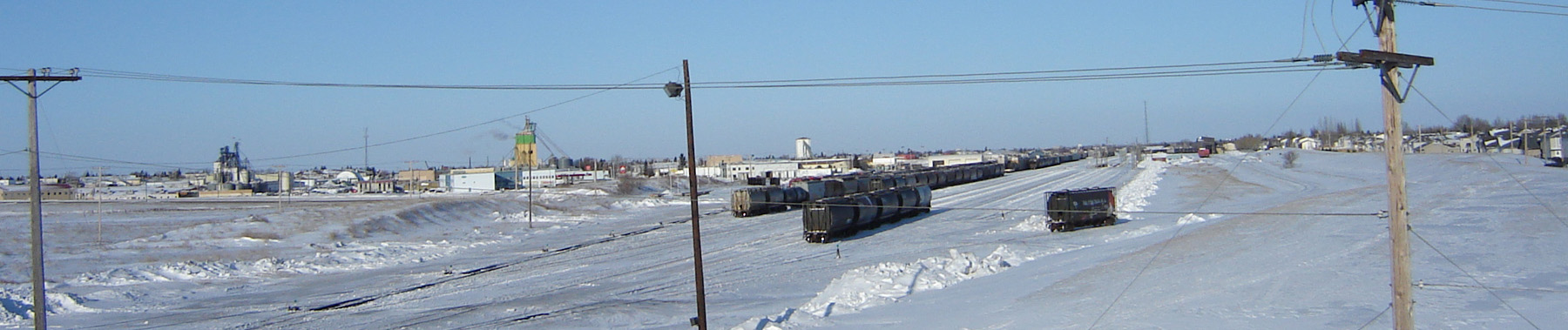
CP Train yards

The entirety of Sutherland Industrial is zoned for industrial uses. Heavy industrial businesses are located along the CPR tracks to the north, while light industrial businesses are concentrated in the south along College Drive.

Currently there are CPR switching yards in the Central Industrial neighbourhood. The City of Saskatoon, Canadian Pacific Railway and the CNR are under negotiations currently to remove these switching yards. This would mean the CPR could use CNR rail lines through the city and be able to use the CN Chappell Yards for switching. Likewise the CNR could run trains along the CPR track through the city and use the Sutherland CPR switching yards. This would involve construction of a connecting switching yard between CP and CN rail lines near 11th Street and Dundonald which could be done as part of the new Circle Drive extension project.

== Location ==
Sutherland Industrial is located within the University Heights Suburban Development Area. It is bounded by Gray Avenue to the north and east, College Drive to the south, and Central Avenue to the west. Some limited residential development on the east side of Central Avenue, including multi-family dwellings on Central Place, are part of the main Sutherland community, rather than Sutherland Industrial.
