= 2005 Telus Cup =

Tournament details
- Venue: Robert Guertin Arena in Gatineau, QC
- Dates: April 18–24, 2005
- Teams: 6

Final positions
- Champions: Saskatoon Contacts
- Runners-up: L'Intrépide de Gatineau
- Third place: Commandeurs de Lévis

Tournament statistics
- Scoring leader: Kyle Bortis

Awards
- MVP: David Richard

The 2005 Telus Cup was Canada's 27th annual national midget 'AAA' hockey championship, played April 18–24, 2005 at the Robert Guertin Arena in Gatineau, Quebec. The Saskatoon Contacts defeated the host L'Intrépide de Gatineau 4–1 in the gold medal game to win the national title. National Hockey League defencemen Luke Schenn and Eric Gryba were members of the Contacts' championship team.

At the start of the 2004-05 hockey season, Telus signed on as a premier sponsor of Hockey Canada. As a result of the sponsorship agreement, the national midget championship was named the Telus Cup. Until 2003, it had been known as the Air Canada Cup.

== Teams ==
| Result | Team | Region | City |
|---|---|---|---|
| 1st place, gold medalist(s) | Saskatoon Contacts | West | Saskatoon, SK |
| 2nd place, silver medalist(s) | L'Intrépide de Gatineau | Host | Gatineau, QC |
| 3rd place, bronze medalist(s) | Commandeurs de Lévis | Québec | Lévis, QC |
| 4 | Don Mills Flyers | Central | Toronto, ON |
| 5 | Cole Harbour McCains | Atlantic | Cole Harbour, NS |
| 6 | Edmonton SSAC | Pacific | Edmonton, AB |

== Round robin ==
=== Standings ===
| Team | Pld | W | L | D | GF | GA | GD | Pts |
|---|---|---|---|---|---|---|---|---|
| Saskatoon Contacts | 5 | 4 | 0 | 1 | 23 | 11 | +12 | 9 |
| Commandeurs de Lévis | 5 | 3 | 1 | 1 | 15 | 11 | +4 | 7 |
| L'Intrépide de Gatineau | 5 | 2 | 3 | 0 | 12 | 11 | +1 | 4 |
| Don Mills Flyers | 5 | 2 | 3 | 0 | 12 | 19 | −7 | 4 |
| Cole Harbour McCains | 5 | 2 | 3 | 0 | 12 | 21 | −9 | 4 |
| Edmonton SSAC | 5 | 1 | 4 | 0 | 17 | 18 | −1 | 2 |

=== Scores ===
- Saskatoon 4 - Edmonton 3
- Lévis 3 - Don Mills 1
- Gatineau 6 - Cole Harbour 0
- Lévis 3 - Saskatoon 3
- Cole Harbour 5 - Edmonton 4 (OT)
- Gatineau 3 - Don Mills 1
- Don Mills 5 - Edmonton 4
- Saskatoon 5 - Cole Harbour 1
- Lévis 2 - Gatineau 1
- Don Mills 3 - Cole Harbour 2
- Lévis 4 - Edmonton 2
- Saskatoon 4 0 Gatineau 2
- Cole Harbour 4 - Lévis 3 (OT)
- Saskatoon 7 - Don Mills 2
- Edmonton 4 - Gatineau 0

== Playoffs ==
=== Semi-finals ===
- Saskatoon 5 - Don Mills 3
- Gatineau 5 - Lévis 2

=== Bronze-medal game ===
- Lévis 7 - Don Mills 3

=== Gold-medal game ===
- Saskatoon 4 - Gatineau 1

== Individual awards ==
- Most Valuable Player: Dave Richard (Saskatoon)
- Top Scorer: Kyle Bortis (Saskatoon)
- Top Forward: Kyle Bortis (Saskatoon)
- Top Defenceman: Eric Gryba (Saskatoon)
- Top Goaltender: Bobby Nadeau (Lévis)
- Most Sportsmanlike Player: Simon Danis-Pépin (Gatineau)

== See also ==
- Telus Cup
