= Erindale =

Erindale may refer to:

- Erindale, Mississauga, an historical village located within the city of Mississauga, Ontario, Canada
- Erindale Secondary School, the high school named after the community in Mississauga.
- Erindale GO Station, a station in the GO Transit network located in the community
- Erindale College, the original name of the University of Toronto Mississauga
- Erindale, Saskatoon, a neighbourhood
- Erindale, South Australia, a suburb in the city of Adelaide, Australia
- Erindale College, in Wanniassa, Australian Capital Territory, Australia
- Erindale Centre, a 'group centre' in Canberra, Australia
