= Eric Gryba =

Canadian ice hockey player (born 1988)

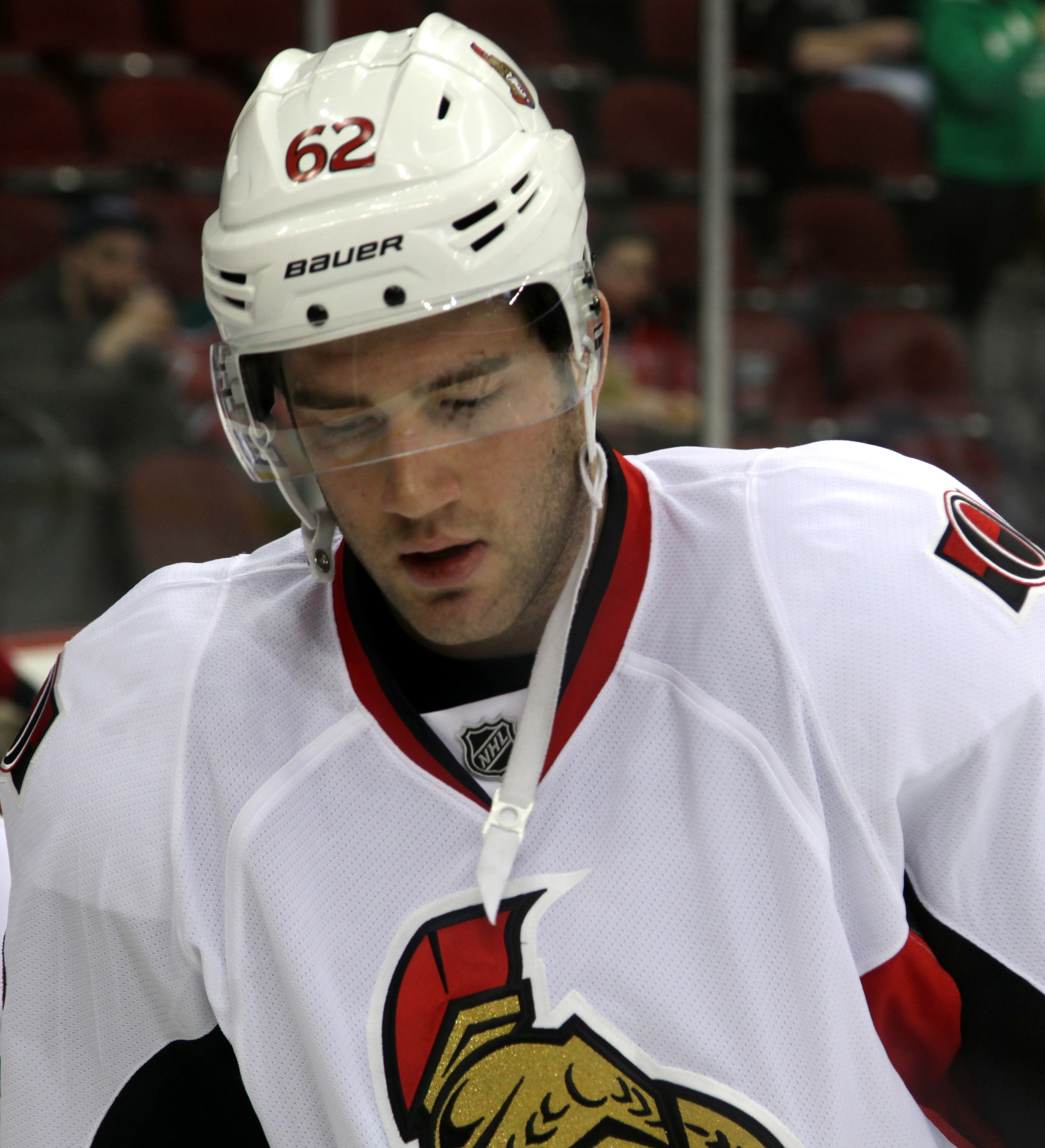
- Gryba with the Ottawa Senators in 2013
- Born: April 14, 1988 (age 38) Saskatoon, Saskatchewan, Canada
- Height: 6 ft 4 in (193 cm)
- Weight: 228 lb (103 kg; 16 st 4 lb)
- Position: Defence
- Shot: Right
- Played for: Ottawa Senators; Edmonton Oilers; New Jersey Devils
- NHL draft: 68th overall, 2006; Ottawa Senators
- Playing career: 2010–2019

Eric David Gryba (born April 14, 1988) is a Canadian former professional ice hockey defenceman. Gryba was selected by the Ottawa Senators in the third round, 68th overall, of the 2006 NHL entry draft.

== Playing career ==
=== Ottawa Senators ===
Gryba was selected in the third round, 68th overall by the Ottawa Senators during the 2006 NHL entry draft. Prior to turning professional, Gryba attended Boston University, where he played four seasons of NCAA Division I ice hockey in the Hockey East conference with the Terriers ice hockey team, winning an NCAA title with the team. During the 2009–10 NCAA season, he tied the school record for most penalty minutes served.

On March 31, 2010, the Ottawa Senators signed Gryba to a two-year, entry-level contract. On February 16, 2013, he made his NHL debut, playing for Ottawa in Toronto against the Toronto Maple Leafs.

Gryba earned his first career NHL point, an assist, against the New York Islanders on February 19, 2013, and scored his first career NHL goal against the Tampa Bay Lightning on March 23, 2013.

On May 2, 2013, in his first Stanley Cup playoff game against the Montreal Canadiens, Gryba delivered a questionable, open-ice hit to Canadiens' forward Lars Eller as Eller received a pass from Raphael Diaz. The hit caused Eller's face to strike the ice, leaving him bleeding and motionless on the ice and later carried off via stretcher. Though there was some question as to whether or not the hit was illegal, Gryba was subsequently suspended for two games when the NHL deemed that Eller's head had been the principal point of contact.

On June 26, 2014, Gryba signed a two-year contract extension with the Senators, valued at $2.5 million.

=== Edmonton Oilers ===
On June 27, 2015, on the second day of the 2015 NHL entry draft, Gryba was traded by the Senators to the Edmonton Oilers in exchange for Travis Ewanyk and the 107th pick in the fourth round (Christian Wolanin).

After appearing in 53 games for the club, the Oilers chose not to re-sign Gryba, making him an unrestricted free agent. However, Gryba signed a one-year, two-way contract on October 12, 2016, after attending the team's camp on a professional tryout. On December 31, 2017, Gryba cleared waivers and was assigned to the Oilers' American Hockey League (AHL) affiliate, the Bakersfield Condors.

On June 21, 2018, the Oilers placed Gryba on unconditional waivers for the purpose of a buyout.

=== New Jersey Devils ===
On July 1, 2018, the opening day of free agency, Gryba was signed by the New Jersey Devils on a one-year, two-way $700,000 contract.

On September 22, 2019, Gryba announced his retirement on his Twitter, after being released from his professional tryout with the Calgary Flames.

== Personal life ==
Gryba's father Shawn is a retired teacher, and his mother Catherine was an executive for the City of Saskatoon. Gryba attended St. Joseph High School. He became engaged to Cate Eckhardt in August 2015 and the two married in the summer of 2016. Gryba is also an avid hunter and fisherman who co-owns a company called Capital Waterfowling, and has a TV show called Grilling With Gryba.

== Career statistics ==
			Regular season					Playoffs
Season	Team	League	GP	G	A	Pts	PIM	GP	G	A	Pts	PIM
2003–04	Saskatoon Contacts AAA	SMHL	39	1	10	11	89	10	4	8	12	20
2004–05	Saskatoon Contacts AAA	SMHL	32	11	29	40	83	11	5	7	12	22
2004–05	Melfort Mustangs	SJHL	2	0	0	0	4	—	—	—	—	—
2005–06	Green Bay Gamblers	USHL	56	3	12	15	205	3	1	1	2	27
2006–07	Boston University	HE	38	1	3	4	76	—	—	—	—	—
2007–08	Boston University	HE	32	1	1	2	54	—	—	—	—	—
2008–09	Boston University	HE	45	0	6	6	106	—	—	—	—	—
2009–10	Boston University	HE	38	4	6	10	118	—	—	—	—	—
2009–10	Binghamton Senators	AHL	6	1	0	1	2	—	—	—	—	—
2010–11	Binghamton Senators	AHL	66	3	4	7	133	10	0	1	1	26
2011–12	Binghamton Senators	AHL	73	5	15	20	95	—	—	—	—	—
2012–13	Binghamton Senators	AHL	38	5	6	11	75	—	—	—	—	—
2012–13	Ottawa Senators	NHL	33	2	4	6	26	4	0	0	0	17
2013–14	Ottawa Senators	NHL	57	2	9	11	64	—	—	—	—	—
2014–15	Ottawa Senators	NHL	75	0	12	12	97	6	0	0	0	14
2015–16	Edmonton Oilers	NHL	53	1	5	6	75	—	—	—	—	—
2016–17	Edmonton Oilers	NHL	40	2	4	6	65	3	0	0	0	4
2017–18	Edmonton Oilers	NHL	21	0	2	2	31	—	—	—	—	—
2017–18	Bakersfield Condors	AHL	24	0	0	0	27	—	—	—	—	—
2018–19	Binghamton Devils	AHL	47	2	5	7	96	—	—	—	—	—
2018–19	New Jersey Devils	NHL	10	0	0	0	10	—	—	—	—	—
2019–20	Kindersley Senior Clippers	SWHL	7	4	6	10	8	3	0	0	0	6
AHL totals			254	16	30	46	428	10	0	1	1	26
NHL totals			289	7	36	43	368	13	0	0	0	35

== Awards and honours ==
Award	Year
Telus Cup Top Defenceman	2005
