= Bed Bath & Beyond =

Bed Bath & Beyond may refer to:

- Bed Bath & Beyond (1987–2023), a defunct brick-and-mortar retailer in the U.S. selling housewares
- Bed Bath & Beyond (2023–present), an existing retailer previously known as Overstock.com that owns and uses the BB&B brand
- "Bed, Bath, & Beyond", an episode of American TV series Will & Grace

== See also ==
- The Container Store / Bed Bath & Beyond, American retail chain, formerly The Container Store
