= Preston Crossing =

- Location: Saskatoon, Saskatchewan, Canada
- Coordinates: 52°8′55.79″N 106°37′6.74″W
- Address: 1715 - 1747 Preston Avenue North
- Opened: Fall 2002
- Developer: Rencor Developments Inc.
- Manager: Harvard Property Management Inc.
- Num. of stores: 22
- Num. of anchor tenants: 6
- Floor area: 432,000 square feet (40,100 m^{2})
- Floors: 1
- Parking: 1820
- Website: prestoncrossing.com

Preston Crossing is a big box power centre in Saskatoon, Saskatchewan, Canada, at Preston Avenue North and Circle Drive.

== History ==
Preston Crossing's development coincided with the construction of an overpass over Circle Drive linking Attridge Drive to a realigned Preston Avenue North. 46 acres (190,000 m^{2}) of land, owned by the University of Saskatchewan, was marked for commercial development. The university paid for the initial water, sewer and roadway construction; in exchange, it leases the land to retail tenants and the revenue goes into its Land Endowment Fund. Preston Avenue bisects the property and is its major access road; a secondary access utilizing the original north/south Preston roadway alignment, allows access from eastbound Circle Drive.

Calgary-based Rencor Developments formed a joint venture called Preston Crossing Properties Inc. with two Saskatchewan companies, Harvard Developments and TGS Properties. It completed all development, leasing and financing for the project; the architecture mirrored the gothic elements of the University campus buildings. In the fall of 2005, Harvard gained sole acquisition of the shopping center.

Construction began in the spring of 2002 and the first stores opened in the fall of the same year Future Shop (later Best Buy) (now demolished) relocated from its original Circle Centre Mall location (across the street From The Centre Mall) where Jysk stands today. In 2003, Canadian Tire Relocated from its Centre Mall location, having been there since its 1986 relocation from its original Market Mall location. It was announced back in 2004 that a new state of the art Walmart would open on the north west corner of the mall replacing its Centre Mall location. Construction started in late August 2004 and completed in January 2005. When the store opened, the one in Centre Mall closed after ten and a half years. Development has continued in phases, although full build-out has not yet been reached. In 2008, Chili's opened as a standalone location beside Rona. In spring 2018, Chili's was shut down. In its place is Olive Garden which opened in 2019. As of 2010, three building phases have been completed; a fourth phase was announced in June 2010. The shopping area had already lost one of its originating tenants, with the Shoppers Drug Mart location going out of business in 2012, after 10 years of operation.

By 2013, a booming economy and low retail vacancy rate prompted plans for Preston Crossing to expand further. The property developer asked for restrictions on the size and types of businesses to be lifted. The restrictions had been implemented over concerns that the big box complex would take business away from other commercial districts like 8th Street, Broadway Avenue and downtown.

In 2014, a deal was signed to build the fifth and final phase of Preston Crossing, utilizing the last of the available land. The new buildings were completed by the spring of 2017.

In 2025 Best Buy Closed its doors forever to make room for an expansion for Canadian Tire to enlarging the store for more space. the Best Buy outlet was demolished in spring of 2026 and construction started on Canadian Tire in June and complete in late September the same year

== Anchor tenants ==
- Canadian Tire later expanded for enlargement the new section has been constructed over the former Best Buy space
- Sobeys (formerly Garden Market IGA)
- Rona+
- Walmart
- Cabela's
- Mark's (formerly Shoppers Drug Mart)
- HomeSence (formally Home Outfitters)
- Marshalls (formally Bed Bath And Beyond & Rooms+Space)

== Former Anchor tenants ==
- Future Shop (2002 2015)
- Best Buy (2015 2025)
- Bed Bath And Beyond (2017 2023)
- Home Outfitters (2003 2019)
- Shopper’s Drug Mart (2002 2012)
- Garden Market IGA (2002 2005)
- Rooms + Spaces (2023 2025)
