= The Centre (Saskatoon) =

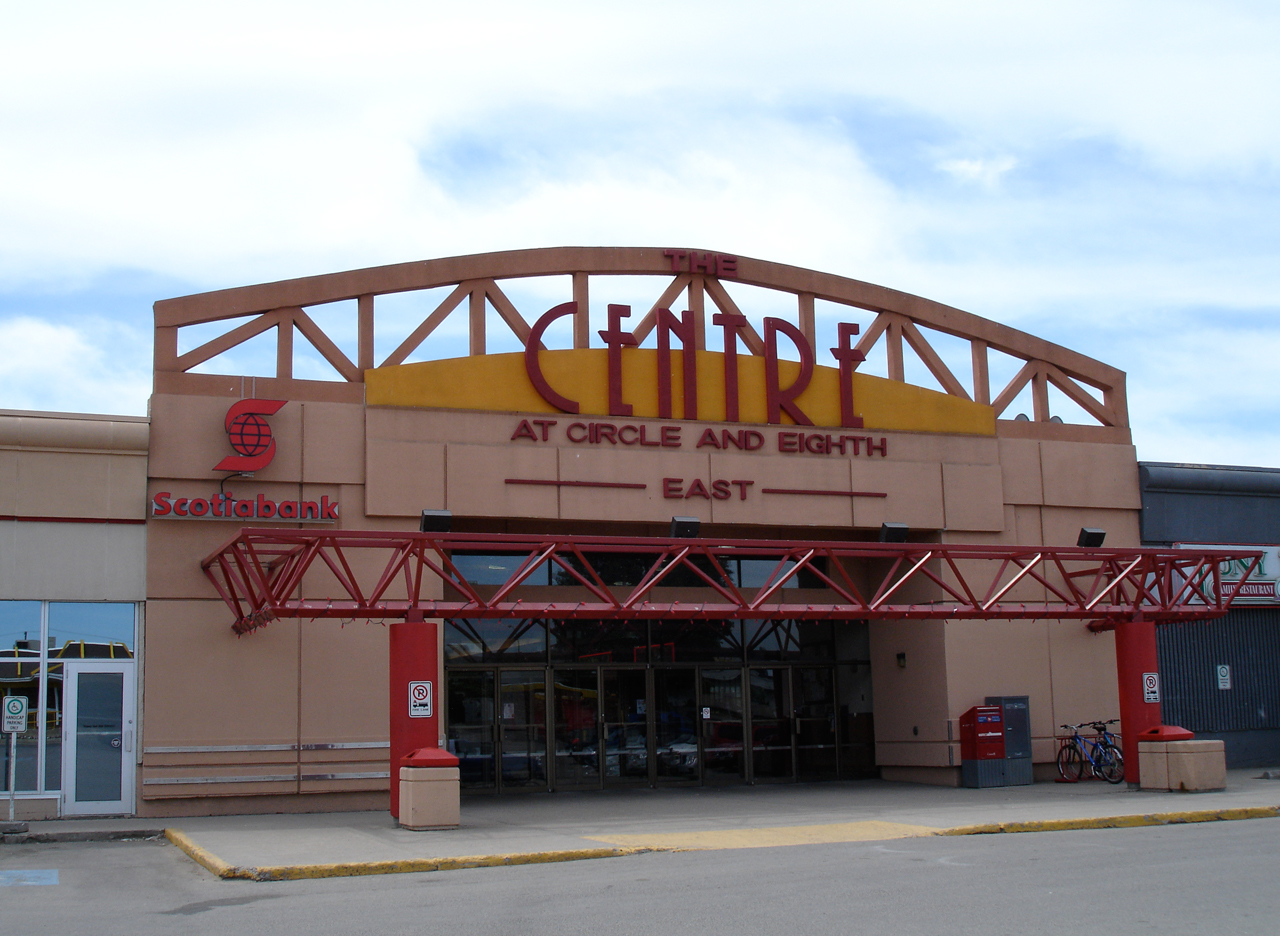
- Centre "East"
- Location: Saskatoon, Saskatchewan, Canada
- Coordinates: 52°6′48″N 106°35′56″W
- Address: 3510 8th Street East
- Opened: 1995
- Manager: Morguard REIT
- Num. of stores: 89
- Num. of anchor tenants: 7 - Saskatoon Co-op, Sport Chek, Atmosphere, Shoppers Drug Mart, Centre Cinemas, Rainbow Cinemas, Best Buy, Indigo Books and Music
- Floor area: 519,347 sq.ft
- Floors: 1
- Parking: 2373 including two level free heated underground parking and free above ground parking
- Website: www.thecentremall.com

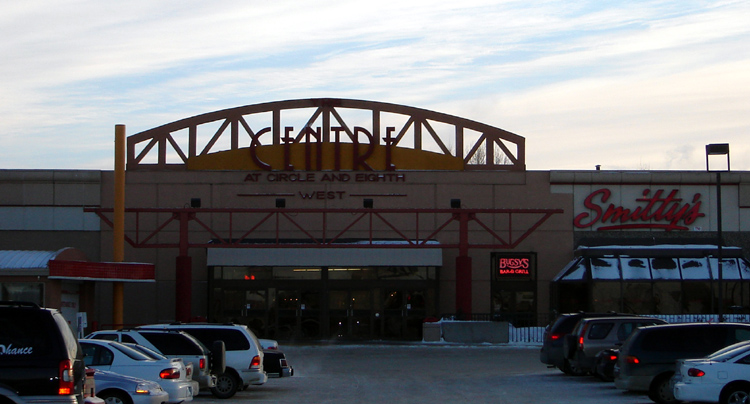
Centre at Circle & 8th "West" prior to renovation

The Centre (former branded as The Centre at Circle and 8th) is a major shopping mall located south-east of the junction of Circle Drive and 8th Street in Saskatoon, Saskatchewan in the Wildwood neighbourhood. Sometimes commonly referred to as The Centre At Circle And 8th or The 8th Street Mall It is currently anchored by Sport Chek, Saskatoon Co-op, Rainbow Cinemas, the Centre Cinemas, Shoppers Drug Mart, Best Buy, Indigo Books and Music and Dollarama. Until 2003–2005, Canadian Tire and Walmart were also part of this mall. They both moved to the big box development of Preston Crossing; a Zellers department store that had operated in the west end of the mall since it was built in the early 1970s subsequently relocated from its original location to occupy the vacated Walmart location at the east end. The Zellers has since closed and has been converted into Target, which also subsequently closed. The Centre boasts more than 90 shops and services, several art display spaces in Centre East, and a 2-level temperature-controlled underground parkade.

== History ==
=== Precursors ===
The Centre was created by the merging of two established shopping centres:

==== County Fair Plaza and Circle Park Mall ====
Centre West first opened in May 1970 as County Fair Plaza. It was not a true shopping mall, but a collection of two major stores - a Zellers department store (which opened on May 28, 1970) and Canada Safeway grocery store (opening date July 14, 1970) - that were joined, along with a few smaller shops accessed via a short corridor, including a Pinder's Drug Store (later Shopper's Drug Mart) location and Toronto-Dominion Bank. In 1985-1986 the mall underwent a significant expansion to become a major enclosed shopping centre, with Canadian Tire relocating from Market Mall to become an anchor tenant (that store would close in early 2003 and relocate to Preston Crossing) and a food court, plus an underground parkade. The expanded mall was rebranded Circle Park Mall.

==== Wildwood Mall ====
Opened on April 25, 1977, Wildwood Mall (now Centre East) was only the second proper enclosed mall on the east side of Saskatoon. Its original anchor tenants were Woolco, a discount department store, and Dominion, a grocery store. The closure of Dominion in the 1980s resulted in a series of unsuccessful renovation attempts. A food court was added but sat mostly vacant (by this time the larger Circle Park Mall had already established its own food court across the street). The remainder of the former Dominion space was initially occupied by a home video rental business (Jumbo Video, which closed after a couple of years), then after 1992 by Pinder's Drugs (later Shopper's Drug Mart; after Shopper's purchased the Pinder's chain there was a period of about a year during which two SDM locations were adjacent to each other, due to there already being one in Circle Park Mall). In 1994, Woolco became Wal-Mart, around the time discussions regarding amalgamation with Circle Park Mall began in earnest. By the mid-1990s, Wildwood Mall had a large number of vacancies and came close to dead mall territory.

=== Post-merger ===
In 1995, the two malls were connected by an underground link under Acadia Drive (after the city rejected a proposal for an at-grade extension that would have resulted in Acadia, a major access route into the Wildwood and Lakeview communities, being closed to traffic). The two "sides" of the mall became known as "Centre East" (former Wildwood) and "Centre West" (former Circle Park). An expanded food court was constructed in Centre West, while the Wildwood Mall food court and large-format retailers in the former Dominion store footprint were converted into two cinemas: a first-run Cineplex and Rainbow Cinemas, a second-run cinema.

The development of the Preston Crossing "power centre" several kilometres north of The Centre led to two major tenants closing and relocating, beginning with Canadian Tire (its location was repurposed for several smaller retailers including a Dollarama and a relocated Shopper's Drug Mart. Then, in the summer of 2004, Walmart relocated; this left a vacancy filled in the spring of 2006 when Zellers moved from its original west anchor spot to the Walmart outlet. The older Zellers outlet was vacant for a time but left open to foot traffic for the Safeway store before redeveloped as a Best Buy in autumn of 2010. As part of this renovation, Safeway was converted into a standalone store, no longer joined physically to the mall. In 2012, Zellers closed and was converted into a Target Canada store, which opened in July 2013 before closing (along with the rest of the Canadian branch of the chain) in 2015.

In 2016 a portion of the Target site was repurposed for an Ardene women's clothing outlet and Goodlife Fitness. Around this time a standalone block of shops including a branch of Indigo Books and Music was constructed along the north side of the property; although not physically connected to the rest of the mall, these retailers are considered part of The Centre.

Following the chain's merger with Sobeys, the Safeway grocery store closed; its location was filled by Saskatoon Co-op, which relocated its food store from a longstanding location further west on 8th Street.

In May 2018, it was announced that Cineplex would open a new seven-screen cinema on the property in 2019. It was concurrently announced that Rainbow Cinemas, the mall's neighbouring second-run cinema, would shut down in 2020, as the mall's owners had declined to renew its lease due to an exclusivity agreement with Cineplex. The new cinema, which maintains a corridor connection to the mall, opened on October 25, 2019. In 2019, renovation work began in Centre East (including the tunnel connection under Acadia Drive) in preparation for redevelopment of the theatres.

== Anchor tenants ==
- Best Buy
- Saskatoon Co-op grocer (stand-alone store)
- Sport Chek
- Shoppers Drug Mart
- Indigo (stand-alone store)
- Dollarama
- Cineplex Cinemas
- Urban Planet
- Ardene
- GoodLife Fitness

== Former anchor tenants ==
- Atmosphere
- Safeway
- Canadian Tire
- PetCetera
- Dominion
- Woolco
- Wal-Mart
- Zellers
- Target

== See also ==
- List of shopping malls in Saskatoon
